= List of Euphorbia species (G–O) =

Euphorbia is a highly diverse plant genus, comprising some 5,000 currently accepted taxa.

This is an alphabetical list of the Euphorbia species and notable intraspecific taxa.

The list includes the former (and never generally accepted) genus Chamaesyce, as well as the related genera Elaeophorbia, Endadenium, Monadenium, Synadenium and Pedilanthus which according to recent DNA sequence-based phylogenetic studies are all nested within Euphorbia

Noticeably succulent plants are marked by (s).

== G ==
- Euphorbia gaditana Coss.
- Euphorbia gaillardotii Boiss. & C.I.Blanche
- Euphorbia galapageia B.L.Rob. & Greenm.
- Euphorbia galgalana S.Carter
- Euphorbia gammaranoi G.Will.
- Euphorbia garanbiensis Hayata
- Euphorbia garberi Engelm. ex Chapm.
- Euphorbia gariepina Boiss.
- Euphorbia garkeana Boiss.
- Euphorbia garuana N.E.Br.
- Euphorbia gasparrinii Boiss.
- Euphorbia gaubae (Soják) Radcl.-Sm.
- Euphorbia gaudichaudii Boiss.
- Euphorbia gaumeri Millsp.
- Euphorbia × gayeri Boros & Soó
- Euphorbia gayi Salis
- Euphorbia gebelica Brullo
- Euphorbia gedrosiaca Rech.f., Aellen & Esfand.
- Euphorbia geldorensis S.Carter
- Euphorbia gemmea P.R.O.Bally & S.Carter
- Euphorbia genistoides P.J.Bergius
- Euphorbia genoudiana Ursch & Leandri
- Euphorbia gentilis N.E.Br.
- Euphorbia gentryi V.W.Steinm. & T.F.Daniel
- Euphorbia georgiana Mayfield
- Euphorbia germainii Phil.
- Euphorbia geroldii Rauh
- Euphorbia gerstneriana Bruyns
- Euphorbia geyeri Engelm. & A.Gray
- Euphorbia × gibelliana Peola
- Euphorbia giessii L.C.Leach
- Euphorbia gigantea J.-P.Castillon
- Euphorbia gilbertiana Bisseret & Specks
- Euphorbia gillettii P.R.O.Bally & S.Carter
- Euphorbia giumboensis A.Hässl.
- Euphorbia glaberrima K.Koch
- Euphorbia gladiata (P.R.O.Bally) Bruyns
- Euphorbia glanduligera Pax
- Euphorbia glareosa Pall. ex M.Bieb.
- Euphorbia glauca G.Forst.
- Euphorbia glaucescens Willd.
- Euphorbia glaucophylla Poir.
- Euphorbia globosa (Haw.) Sims
- Euphorbia globulicaulis S.Carter
- Euphorbia glochidiata Pax
- Euphorbia glyptosperma Engelm.
- Euphorbia godana Buddens., Lawant & Lavranos
- Euphorbia gokakensis S.R.Yadav, Malpure & Chandore
- Euphorbia × goldei Prokh.
- Euphorbia goliana Comm. ex Lam.
- Euphorbia gollmeriana Klotzsch ex Boiss.
- Euphorbia golondrina L.C.Wheeler
- Euphorbia gorenflotii Mobayen
- Euphorbia gossypina Pax
- Euphorbia gottlebei Rauh
- Euphorbia goyazensis Boiss.
- Euphorbia gracilicaulis L.C.Leach
- Euphorbia graciliramea Pax
- Euphorbia graciliramulosa Haev. & Hett.
- Euphorbia gracillima S.Watson
- Euphorbia gradyi V.W.Steinm. & Ram.-Roa
- Euphorbia graminea Jacq.
- Euphorbia graminifolia Vill.
- Euphorbia grammata (McVaugh) Oudejans
- Euphorbia grandicornis Blanc
- Euphorbia grandidens Haw.
- Euphorbia grandidieri Baill.
- Euphorbia grandifolia Haw.
- Euphorbia grandilobata Chiov.
- Euphorbia graniticola L.C.Leach
- Euphorbia grantii Oliv.
- Euphorbia granulata Forssk.
- Euphorbia greenwayi P.R.O.Bally & S.Carter
- Euphorbia gregaria Marloth
- Euphorbia greggii Engelm. ex Boiss.
- Euphorbia gregoriensis Halford & W.K.Harris
- Euphorbia greuteri N.Kilian, Kürschner & P.Hein
- Euphorbia griffithii Hook.f.
- Euphorbia grisea Engelm. ex Boiss.
- Euphorbia griseola Pax
- Euphorbia grisophylla M.L.S.Khan
- Euphorbia grosseri Pax
- Euphorbia grossheimii (Prokh.) Prokh.
- Euphorbia guachanca Azara
- Euphorbia guadalajarana S.Watson
- Euphorbia guadalhorcensis Casim.-Sor.Solanas & Hidalgo-Triana
- Euphorbia guanarensis Pittier
- Euphorbia guaraniorum P.Carrillo & V.W.Steinm.
- Euphorbia guatemalensis Standl. & Steyerm.
- Euphorbia gueinzii Boiss.
- Euphorbia guentheri (Pax) Bruyns
- Euphorbia guerichiana Pax
- Euphorbia guiengola W.R.Buck & Huft
- Euphorbia guillauminiana Boiteau
- Euphorbia gulestanica Podlech
- Euphorbia gumaroi J.Meyrán
- Euphorbia gummifera Boiss.
- Euphorbia gundlachii Urb.
- Euphorbia guntensis (Prokh.) Prokh.
- Euphorbia gutierrezii García-Beltrán & J.L.Gómez
- Euphorbia guyoniana Boiss. & Reut.
- Euphorbia gymnocalycioides M.G.Gilbert & S.Carter
- Euphorbia gymnoclada Boiss.
- Euphorbia gymnonota Urb.
- Euphorbia gypsicola Rech.f. & Aellen
- Euphorbia gypsophila S.Carter

== H ==
- Euphorbia hadramautica Baker
- Euphorbia haeleeleana D.R.Herbst
- Euphorbia haematantha Boiss.
- Euphorbia haevermansii X.Aubriot & Lowry
- Euphorbia hainanensis Croizat
- Euphorbia hajhirensis Radcl.-Sm.
- Euphorbia halemanui Sherff
- Euphorbia hallii R.A.Dyer
- Euphorbia hamaderoensis A.G.Mill.
- Euphorbia hamata (Haw.) Sweet
- Euphorbia hammeri K.Bradley & Sadle
- Euphorbia handeniensis S.Carter
- Euphorbia handiensis Burchard
- Euphorbia hararensis Pax
- Euphorbia hardyi (Rauh) Haev. & Hett.
- Euphorbia hassallii Halford & W.K.Harris
- Euphorbia haussknechtii Boiss.
- Euphorbia hebecarpa Boiss.
- Euphorbia hedigeriana (Malaisse) Bruyns
- Euphorbia hedyotoides N.E.Br.
- Euphorbia heishuiensis W.T.Wang
- Euphorbia heldreichii Orph. ex Boiss.
- Euphorbia helenae Urb.
- Euphorbia heleniana Thell. & Stapf
- Euphorbia helioscopia L.
- Euphorbia helleri Millsp.
- Euphorbia helwigii Urb. & Ekman
- Euphorbia henricksonii M.C.Johnst.
- Euphorbia hepatica Urb. & Ekman
- Euphorbia heptagona L.
- Euphorbia heptapotamica Golosk.
- Euphorbia heraldiana (Millsp.) Oudejans
- Euphorbia herbacea (Pax) Bruyns
- Euphorbia herbstii (W.L.Wagner) Oudejans
- Euphorbia hercegovina Beck
- Euphorbia herman-schwartzii Rauh
- Euphorbia herniariifolia Willd.
- Euphorbia herrei A.C.White, R.A.Dyer & B.Sloane
- Euphorbia herteri Arechav.
- Euphorbia hervei Houyelle
- Euphorbia heteradena Jaub. & Spach
- Euphorbia heterochroma Pax
- Euphorbia heterodoxa Müll.Arg.
- Euphorbia heterophylla L.
- Euphorbia heteropodum Pax
- Euphorbia heterospina S.Carter
- Euphorbia hexadenia Denis
- Euphorbia hexagona Nutt. ex Spreng.
- Euphorbia hexagonoides S.Watson
- Euphorbia heyligersiana P.I.Forst.
- Euphorbia heyneana Spreng.
- Euphorbia hiernii (Croizat) Oudejans
- Euphorbia hieroglyphica Coss. & Durieu ex Boiss.
- Euphorbia hieronymi Subils
- Euphorbia hierosolymitana Boiss.
- Euphorbia hillebrandii H.Lév.
- Euphorbia hindsiana Benth.
- Euphorbia hinkleyorum I.M.Johnst.
- Euphorbia hintonii L.C.Wheeler
- Euphorbia hirsuta L.
- Euphorbia hirta L.
- Euphorbia hirtella Boiss.
- Euphorbia hislopii N.E.Br.
- Euphorbia hispaniolensis García-Beltrán
- Euphorbia hispida Boiss.
- Euphorbia hockii De Wild.
- Euphorbia hoffmanniana (Klotzsch & Garcke) Boiss.
- Euphorbia hofstaetteri Rauh
- Euphorbia holmesiae Lavranos
- Euphorbia holochlorina Rizzini
- Euphorbia hondurana Standl. & L.O.Williams
- Euphorbia hooveri L.C.Wheeler
- Euphorbia hormorrhiza Radcl.-Sm.
- Euphorbia horwoodii S.Carter & Lavranos
- Euphorbia hsinchuensis (S.C.Lin & S.M.Chaw) C.Y.Wu & J.S.Ma
- Euphorbia hubertii Pax
- Euphorbia humayensis Brandegee
- Euphorbia humbertii Denis
- Euphorbia humifusa Willd.
- Euphorbia humilis Ledeb.
- Euphorbia humistrata Engelm. ex A.Gray
- Euphorbia hunzikeri Subils
- Euphorbia huttoniae N.E.Br.
- Euphorbia hyberna L.
- Euphorbia hylonoma Hand.-Mazz.
- Euphorbia hypericifolia L.
- Euphorbia hypogaea Marloth
- Euphorbia hyrcana Grossh.
- Euphorbia hyssopifolia L.

== I ==
- Euphorbia iancannellii Bruyns
- Euphorbia iberica Boiss.
- Euphorbia iharanae Rauh
- Euphorbia illirica Lam.
- Euphorbia iloitaii Powys & S.Carter
- Euphorbia imitata N.E.Br.
- Euphorbia immersa P.R.O.Bally & S.Carter
- Euphorbia imparispina S.Carter
- Euphorbia imperatae (Leandri ex J.-P.Castillon & J.-B.Castillon) Haev. & Hett.
- Euphorbia impressa Chiov.
- Euphorbia inaequilatera Sond.
- Euphorbia inaequispina N.E.Br.
- Euphorbia inaguaensis Oudejans
- Euphorbia inappendiculata Domin
- Euphorbia inarticulata Schweinf.
- Euphorbia incerta Brandegee
- Euphorbia inconstantia R.A.Dyer
- Euphorbia inculta P.R.O.Bally
- Euphorbia inderiensis Less. ex Kar. & Kir.
- Euphorbia indica Lam.
- Euphorbia indistincta P.I.Forst.
- Euphorbia indivisa (Engelm.) Tidestr.
- Euphorbia indurescens L.C.Leach
- Euphorbia inermis Mill.
- Euphorbia infernidialis V.W.Steinm.
- Euphorbia ingens E.Mey. ex Boiss.
- Euphorbia ingenticapsa L.C.Leach
- Euphorbia × ingezalahiana Ursch & Leandri
- Euphorbia innocua L.C.Wheeler
- Euphorbia insarmentosa P.G.Mey.
- Euphorbia insulana Vell.
- Euphorbia insularis Boiss.
- Euphorbia intisy Drake
- Euphorbia intricata S.Carter
- Euphorbia inundata Torr. ex Chapm.
- Euphorbia inundaticola L.C.Leach
- Euphorbia invaginata Croizat
- Euphorbia invenusta (N.E.Br.) Bruyns
- Euphorbia ipecacuanhae L.
- Euphorbia iranshahrii Pahlevani
- Euphorbia irgisensis Litv.
- Euphorbia isacantha Pax
- Euphorbia isaloensis Drake
- Euphorbia isatidifolia Lam.
- Euphorbia isaurica M.L.S.Khan
- Euphorbia itampolensis (Rauh) Haev. & Hett.
- Euphorbia itremensis Kimnach & Lavranos
- Euphorbia ivanjohnstonii M.C.Johnst.
- Euphorbia ixtlana Huft

== J ==
- Euphorbia × jablonskiana Polatschek
- Euphorbia jablonskii V.W.Steinm.
- Euphorbia jacquemontii Boiss.
- Euphorbia jaegeri V.W.Steinm. & J.M.André
- Euphorbia jaliscensis B.L.Rob. & Greenm.
- Euphorbia jamesonii Boiss.
- Euphorbia japygica Ten.
- Euphorbia jatrophoides Pax
- Euphorbia jeanbernardii J.-P.Castillon
- Euphorbia jejuna M.C.Johnst. & Warnock
- Euphorbia jenisseiensis Baikov
- Euphorbia jodhpurensis Blatt. & Hallb.
- Euphorbia johannis S.Carter
- Euphorbia johnstonii Mayfield
- Euphorbia jolkinii Boiss.
- Euphorbia josei Oudejans
- Euphorbia joyae P.R.O.Bally & S.Carter
- Euphorbia × jubaeaphylla Svent.
- Euphorbia jubata L.C.Leach
- Euphorbia juttae Dinter
- Euphorbia juvoklanti Pax

== K ==
- Euphorbia kabridarensis Thulin
- Euphorbia kadapensis Sarojin. & R.R.V.Raju
- Euphorbia kaessneri Pax
- Euphorbia kalambatitrensis Haev., Hett. & Spannring
- Euphorbia kalbaensis Baikov & I.V.Khan
- Euphorbia kalisana S.Carter
- Euphorbia kamerunica Pax
- Euphorbia kamponii Rauh & Petignat
- Euphorbia kanalensis Boiss.
- Euphorbia kanaorica Boiss.
- Euphorbia kansuensis Prokh.
- Euphorbia kansui S.L.Liou ex S.B.Ho
- Euphorbia kaokoensis (A.C.White, R.A.Dyer & B.Sloane) L.C.Leach
- Euphorbia karibensis S.Carter
- Euphorbia karoi Freyn
- Euphorbia katrajensis Gage
- Euphorbia kavirensis Pahlevani
- Euphorbia keithii R.A.Dyer
- Euphorbia kelleri Pax
- Euphorbia kerneri Huter ex A.Kern.
- Euphorbia kerstingii Pax
- Euphorbia khabrica Pahlevani
- Euphorbia khandallensis Blatt. & Hallb.
- Euphorbia khasyana Boiss.
- Euphorbia khorasanica Saeidi & Ghayorm.
- Euphorbia kianjavatoana J.-P.Castillon
- Euphorbia kilwana N.E.Br.
- Euphorbia kimberleyana (G.Will.) Bruyns
- Euphorbia kimberleyensis B.G.Thomson
- Euphorbia kingdon-wardii Binojk. & N.P.Balakr.
- Euphorbia kirimzjulica Stepanov
- Euphorbia kiritensis P.R.O.Bally & S.Carter
- Euphorbia kirkii (N.E.Br.) Bruyns
- Euphorbia kischenensis Vierh.
- Euphorbia klotzschii Oudejans
- Euphorbia knobelii Letty
- Euphorbia knuthii Pax
- Euphorbia komaroviana Prokh.
- Euphorbia kondoi Rauh & Razaf.
- Euphorbia kopetdaghi (Prokh.) Prokh.
- Euphorbia korshinskyi Geltman
- Euphorbia kotschyana Fenzl
- Euphorbia kouandenensis Beille ex A.Chev.
- Euphorbia kozlovii Prokh.
- Euphorbia kraussiana Bernh.
- Euphorbia kudrjaschevii (Pazij) Prokh.
- Euphorbia kundelunguensis (Malaisse) Bruyns
- Euphorbia kuriensis Vierh.
- Euphorbia kurtzii Subils
- Euphorbia kuwaleana O.Deg. & Sherff

== L ==
- Euphorbia labatii Rauh & Bard.-Vauc. (s)
- Euphorbia lacei Craib (s)
- Euphorbia lacera Boiss.
- Euphorbia laciniata Panigrahi
- Euphorbia lactea Haw. (s) - Elkhorn, frilled fan, mottled spurge
- Euphorbia lactiflua Phil. (s)
- Euphorbia laevigata Lam.
- Euphorbia lagascae Spreng.
- Euphorbia lagunensis Huft
- Euphorbia laikipiensis S.Carter
- Euphorbia lamarckii Sweet (s)
- Euphorbia lambii Svent. (s)
- Euphorbia lancasteriana Radcl.-Sm.
- Euphorbia lancifolia Schltdl. (s) – Ixbut
- Euphorbia laredana Millsp.
- Euphorbia larica Boiss. (s)
- Euphorbia larranagae Oudejans
- Euphorbia lasiocarpa Klotzsch
- Euphorbia lata Engelm.
- Euphorbia latazi Kunth
- Euphorbia latericolor Brandegee (s)
- Euphorbia lateriflora Schumach. & Thonn. (s)
- Euphorbia lathyris L. - Caper spurge, gopher spurge
- Euphorbia latifolia C.A.Mey. ex Ledeb.
- Euphorbia laurifolia Lam. (s)
- Euphorbia lavicola S.Carter (s)
- Euphorbia lavrani L.C.Leach (s)
- Euphorbia laxa Drake
- Euphorbia leandriana Boiteau (s)
- Euphorbia lecheoides Millsp.
  - Euphorbia lecheoides var. lecheoides
  - Euphorbia lecheoides var. exumensis (Millsp.) Oudejans
  - Euphorbia lecheoides var. wilsonii (Millsp.) Oudejans
- Euphorbia ledermanniana Pax & K.Hoffmann (s)
- Euphorbia ledienii A.Berger (s)
  - Euphorbia ledienii var. dregei N.E.Br. (s)
  - Euphorbia ledienii var. ledienii (s)
- Euphorbia leistneri R.H.Archer (s)
- Euphorbia lemaireana Boiss. (s)
- Euphorbia lenensis K.S.Baikov
- Euphorbia lenewtonii S.Carter (s)
- Euphorbia leonardii (D.G.Burch) Radcl.-Sm.
- Euphorbia leoncroizatii Oudejans
- Euphorbia leonensis N.E.Br. (s)
- Euphorbia leontopoda S.Carter (s)
- Euphorbia leptocaula Boiss.
- Euphorbia leptoclada Balf.f. (s)
- Euphorbia leshumensis N.E.Br.
- Euphorbia letestuana (Denis) Bruyns (s) (= Monadenium letestuanum)
- Euphorbia letestui J.Raynal (s)
- Euphorbia leucantha (Klotzsch & Garcke ex Klotzsch) Boiss.
- Euphorbia leucocephala Lotsy (s) - Pascuita, white-laced euphorbia
- Euphorbia leucochlamys Chiov. (s)
- Euphorbia leucodendron Drake (s)
  - Euphorbia leucodendron subsp. leucodendron (s)
  - Euphorbia leucodendron subsp. oncoclada (Drake) Rauh & Koutnik (s)
- Euphorbia leuconeura Boiss. (s)
- Euphorbia leucophylla Benth. (s)
  - Euphorbia leucophylla subsp. comcaacorum V.W.Steinm. & Felger (s)
  - Euphorbia leucophylla subsp. leucophylla (s)
- Euphorbia levis Poir.
- Euphorbia lignosa Marloth (s)
- Euphorbia ligularia Roxb.
- Euphorbia ligustrina Boiss.
- Euphorbia limaensis Oudejans
- Euphorbia limpopoana S.Carter (s)
- Euphorbia lindenii (S.Carter) Bruyns (s) (= Monadenium lindenii)
- Euphorbia linearibracteata L.C.Leach (s)
- Euphorbia lineata S.Watson
- Euphorbia lingiana C.Shih ex Chun
- Euphorbia linguiformis McVaugh
  - Euphorbia linguiformis var. actinadenia (McVaugh) Oudejans
  - Euphorbia linguiformis var. linguiformis
- Euphorbia lingulata Heuff.
- Euphorbia linifolia L.
- Euphorbia lipskyi (Prokh.) Prokh.
- Euphorbia lissosperma S.Carter
- Euphorbia liukiuensis Hayata
- Euphorbia livida E.Mey. ex Boiss.
- Euphorbia lividiflora L.C.Leach (s)
- Euphorbia loadensis N.E.Br.
- Euphorbia lomelii V.W.Steinm. (s) (= Pedilanthus macrocarpus)
- Euphorbia longecorniculata Kitam.
- Euphorbia longecornuta S.Watson
- Euphorbia longicruris Scheele - Wedgeleaf spurge
- Euphorbia longifolia Lam. (s)
- Euphorbia longinsulicola S.R.Hill (s)
- Euphorbia longispina Chiov. (s)
- Euphorbia longistyla Boiss.
- Euphorbia longituberculosa Boiss. (s)
- Euphorbia lophiosperma S.Carter
- Euphorbia lophogonaLam. (s) – Randramboay
  - Euphorbia lophogona var. lophogona (s)
  - Euphorbia lophogona var. tenuicaulisRauh (s)
- Euphorbia loricataLam. (s)
- Euphorbia louwii L.C.Leach (s)
- Euphorbia luapulana L.C.Leach (s)
- Euphorbia lucida Waldst. & Kit. - Shining spurge
- Euphorbia luciismithii B.L.Rob. & Greenm. (s)
- Euphorbia lucorum Rupr.
- Euphorbia ludoviciana Raf.
- Euphorbia lugardiae (N.E.Br.) Bruyns (s) (= Monadenium lugardiae)
- Euphorbia lukoseana S.Carter (s)
- Euphorbia lumbricalis L.C.Leach (s)
- Euphorbia lundelliana Croizat ex Lundell (s)
- Euphorbia lunulata Bunge
- Euphorbia lupatensis N.E.Br.
- Euphorbia lupulina Boiss. (s)
- Euphorbia lurida Engelm.
- Euphorbia luteoviridis D.G.Long
- Euphorbia luticola Hand.-Mazz.
- Euphorbia lutosa S.Carter
- Euphorbia lutulenta (Croizat) Oudejans
- Euphorbia luzoniensis E.D.Merrill
- Euphorbia lycioides Boiss. (s)
- Euphorbia lydenburgensis Schweik. & Letty (s)

== M ==
- Euphorbia macella N.E.Br. (s)
- Euphorbia macgillivrayi Boiss.
- Euphorbia machrisiae Steyerm.
- Euphorbia macinensis Prodan
- Euphorbia macra Hiern
- Euphorbia macraulonia Phil. (s)
- Euphorbia macrocarpa Boiss.
- Euphorbia macroceras Fisch. & C.A.Mey.
- Euphorbia macroclada Boiss.
- Euphorbia macroglypha Lem. (s)
- Euphorbia macrophylla Pax (s)
- Euphorbia macropodoides B.L.Rob. & Greenm. (s)
- Euphorbia macropus (Klotzsch & Garcke) Boiss. (s) - Huachuca mountain spurge
- Euphorbia macrorrhiza C.A.Mey. ex Ledeb.
- Euphorbia maculata L. (s) - Spotted spurge
- Euphorbia macvaughiana M.C.Johnst.
- Euphorbia macvaughii Carvajal & Lomeli ex Carvajal
- Euphorbia maddenii Boiss.
- Euphorbia mafingensis (Hargreaves) Bruyns (s) (= Monadenium mafingense)
- Euphorbia magdalenae Benth. (s)
- Euphorbia magnicapsula S.Carter (s)
  - Euphorbia magnicapsula var. lacterosa S.Carter (s)
  - Euphorbia magnicapsula var. magnicapsula (s)
- Euphorbia magnifica (E.A.Bruce) Bruyns (s) (= Monadenium magnificum)
- Euphorbia mahabobokensis Rauh (s)
- Euphorbia mahafalensis Denis (s)
  - Euphorbia mahafalensis var. mahafalensis (s)
  - Euphorbia mahafalensis var. xanthadenia (Denis) Leandri (s)
- Euphorbia mainty Denis ex Leandri (s)
- Euphorbia maieri H.Lév.
- Euphorbia makallensis S.Carter (s)
- Euphorbia maleolens Phillips (s)
- Euphorbia malevola L.C.Leach (s)
- Euphorbia malleata Boiss.
- Euphorbia malurensis Rech.f.
- Euphorbia malvana Maire
- Euphorbia mamfwensis (Malaisse & Lecron) Bruyns (s) (= Monadenium mamfwense)
- Euphorbia mammillaris L. (s) - Corn cob euphorbia
- Euphorbia mananarensis Leandri (s)
- Euphorbia mancinella Baillon
- Euphorbia mandrariensis Drake (s)
- Euphorbia mandravioky Leandri (s)
- Euphorbia mandshurica Maxim.
- Euphorbia mangleti Urb.
- Euphorbia mangelsdorffii Rauh (s)
- Euphorbia mangokyensis Denis (s)
- Euphorbia mangorensis Leandri
- Euphorbia marayensis Subils
- Euphorbia maresii Knoche
- Euphorbia margalidiana ;Kuhbier & Lewej. ex Kuhbier (s)
- Euphorbia margaretae S.Carter (s)
- Euphorbia marginata Pursh - Snow-on-the-mountain, variegated spurge, white-margined spurge
- Euphorbia marianoi Oudejans
- Euphorbia marie-cladieae Rzepecky
- Euphorbia marilandica Greene
- Euphorbia maritae Rauh (s)
- Euphorbia marlothiana N.E.Br. (s)
- Euphorbia marrupana Bruyns (s)
- Euphorbia marsabitensis S.Carter (s)
- Euphorbia marshalliana Boiss.
  - Euphorbia marshalliana subsp. marshalliana
  - Euphorbia marshalliana subsp. armenae (Prokh.) Oudejans
- Euphorbia martinae Rauh (s)
- Euphorbia masirahensis S.A.Ghazanfar (s)
- Euphorbia matabelensis Pax (s)
- Euphorbia matritensis Boiss.
- Euphorbia mauritanica L. (s)
  - Euphorbia mauritanica var. corallothamnus Dinter ex A.C.White, R.A.Dyer & B.Sloane (s)
  - Euphorbia mauritanica var. foetens Dinter ex A.C.White, R.A.Dyer & B.Sloane (s)
  - Euphorbia mauritanica var. lignosa A.C.White, R.A.Dyer & B.Sloane (s)
  - Euphorbia mauritanica var. mauritanica (s)
  - Euphorbia mauritanica var. minor A.C.White, R.A.Dyer & B.Sloane (s)
  - Euphorbia mauritanica var. namaquensis N.E.Br. (s)
- Euphorbia maysillesii McVaugh
- Euphorbia mayurnathanii Croizat (s)
- Euphorbia mazarronensis Esteve Chueca
- Euphorbia mazatlamensis Oudejans
- Euphorbia mazicum Emb. & Maire
- Euphorbia medicaginea Boiss.
- Euphorbia meenae S.Carter (s)
- Euphorbia megalatlantica J.Ball
- Euphorbia megalocarpa Rech.f.
- Euphorbia melanadenia Torr.
- Euphorbia melanocarpa Boiss.
- Euphorbia melanohydrata Nel (s)
- Euphorbia melapetala Gasparr.
- Euphorbia melitensis Parl. (s)
- Euphorbia meloformis Aiton (s)
  - Euphorbia meloformis subsp. meloformis (s) - Melon spurge
  - Euphorbia meloformis subsp. valida (N.E.Br.) G.D.Rowley (s)
- Euphorbia memoralis R.A.Dyer (s)
- Euphorbia mendezii Boiss.
- Euphorbia menelikii Pax
- Euphorbia mercurialina Michx. - Mercury spurge
- Euphorbia meridensis Pittier
- Euphorbia meridionalis P.R.O.Bally & S.Carter (s)
- Euphorbia mertonii Fosberg
- Euphorbia mesembryanthemifolia Jacq. (s)
- Euphorbia meuleniana Schwartz (s)
- Euphorbia meuselii Geltman
- Euphorbia mexiae Standl.
- Euphorbia meyeniana Klotzsch
- Euphorbia meyeriana Galushko
- Euphorbia micracantha Boiss. (s)
- Euphorbia micractina Boiss.
- Euphorbia micradenia Boiss.
- Euphorbia microcarpa (Prokh.) P.Klylov
- Euphorbia microcephala Boiss.
- Euphorbia microclada Urb.
- Euphorbia micromera Boiss. ex Engelm.
- Euphorbia microsciadia Boiss.
- Euphorbia microsperma (Murb.) Maly
- Euphorbia microsphaera Boiss.
- Euphorbia migiurtinorum Chiov. (s)
- Euphorbia milii Desmoul. (s) - Crown-of-thorns, christplant
  - Euphorbia milii var. bevilaniensis (Croizat) Ursch & Leandri (s)
  - Euphorbia milii var. hislopii (N.E.Br.) Ursch & Leandri (s)
  - Euphorbia milii var. imperatae (Leandri) Ursch & Leandri (s)
  - Euphorbia milii var. longifolia Rauh (s)
  - Euphorbia milii var. milii
  - Euphorbia milii var. splendens (Bojer ex Hook.) Ursch & Leandri (s)
  - Euphorbia milii var. tananarivae (Leandri) Ursch & Leandri (s)
  - Euphorbia milii var. tenuispina Rauh & Razaf. (s)
  - Euphorbia milii var. tulearensis Ursch & Leandri (s)
  - Euphorbia milii var. vulcanii (Leandri) Ursch & Leandri (s)
- Euphorbia millotii Ursch & Leandri (s)
- Euphorbia minbuensis Gage
- Euphorbia minuta Loscos & Pard.
  - Euphorbia minuta subsp. minuta
  - Euphorbia minuta subsp. moleroi P.Montserrat Recoder & J.V.Ferrández Palacio
- Euphorbia minutifolia Boiss.
- Euphorbia minutula Boiss.
- Euphorbia minxianensis W.T.Wang
- Euphorbia mira L.C.Leach (s)
- Euphorbia misella S.Watson
- Euphorbia misera Benth. (s) - Cliff spurge
- Euphorbia missurica Raf.
- Euphorbia mitchelliana Boiss.
- Euphorbia mitriformis P.R.O.Bally & S.Carter (s)
- Euphorbia mixta N.E.Br. (s)
- Euphorbia mlanjeana L.C.Leach (s)
- Euphorbia mocinoi Oudejans
- Euphorbia moehringioides Pax
- Euphorbia monacantha Pax (s)
- Euphorbia monadenoides M.G.Gilbert (s)
- Euphorbia monantha C.Wright ex Boiss.
- Euphorbia monchiquensis Franco & P. Silva
- Euphorbia monensis (Millsp.) Urb.
- Euphorbia mongolica (Prokh.) Prokh.
- Euphorbia monostyla (Prokh.) Prokh.
- Euphorbia monteiri Hook.f. (s)
  - Euphorbia monteiri subsp. brandbergensis B.Nord. (s)
  - Euphorbia monteiri subsp. monteiri (s)
  - Euphorbia monteiri subsp. ramosa L.C.Leach (s)
- Euphorbia montenegrina (Baldacci) Maly
- Euphorbia moratii Rauh (s)
  - Euphorbia moratii var. antsingiensis Cremers (s)
  - Euphorbia moratii var. bemaharensis Cremers (s)
  - Euphorbia moratii var. moratii (s)
  - Euphorbia moratii var. multiflora Rauh (s)
- Euphorbia mosaica P.R.O.Bally & S.Carter (s)
- Euphorbia mossambicensis (Klotzsch & Garcke) Boiss.
- Euphorbia mossamedensis N.E.Br.
- Euphorbia mucronulata (Prokh.) Prokh.
- Euphorbia muelleri Boiss.
- Euphorbia muirii N.E.Br. (s)
- Euphorbia multiceps A.Berger (s)
- Euphorbia multiclava P.R.O.Bally & S.Carter (s)
- Euphorbia multifida N.E.Br. (s)
- Euphorbia multifolia A.C.White, R.A.Dyer & B.Sloane (s)
- Euphorbia multifoliosa M.E.Jones
- Euphorbia multiformis Hook. & Arn.
- Euphorbia multifurcata Rech.f., Aellen & Esfand. ex Rech.f.
- Euphorbia multinodis Urb.
- Euphorbia multiseta Benth.
- Euphorbia mundtii N.E.Br. (s)
- Euphorbia munizii Borhidi (s)
- Euphorbia muraltioides N.E.Br.
- Euphorbia muricata Thunb.
- Euphorbia musciola Fernald (s)
- Euphorbia musili Velen.
- Euphorbia mwinilungensis L.C.Leach (s)
- Euphorbia myrioclada S.Carter (s)
- Euphorbia myrsinites L. (s) - Creeping spurge, donkey tail, myrtle spurge
  - Euphorbia myrsinites subsp. myrsinites (s)
  - Euphorbia myrsinites subsp. pontica (Prokh.) R.Turner (s)
  - Euphorbia myrsinites subsp. rechingeri (Greuter) Aldén (s)
- Euphorbia myrtillifolia L.
- Euphorbia myrtoides Boiss.

== N ==
- Euphorbia nagleri (Klotzsch & Garcke ex Klotzsch) Boiss.
- Euphorbia namibensis Marloth (s)
- Euphorbia namuliensis Bruyns (s)
- Euphorbia namuskluftensis L.C.Leach (s)
- Euphorbia natalensis Bernh. ex Krauss
- Euphorbia nayarensis V.W.Steinm.
- Euphorbia nealleyi Coult. & Fisher
- Euphorbia nebrownii Merr.
- Euphorbia negromontana N.E.Br.
- Euphorbia neilmulleri M.C.Johnst.
- Euphorbia nematocypha Hand.-Mazz.
- Euphorbia neoangolensis Bruyns (s) (= Monadenium angolense)
- Euphorbia neoarborescens Bruyns (s) (= Monadenium arborescens)
- Euphorbia neobosseri Rauh (s)
  - Euphorbia neobosseri var. itampolensis Rauh (s)
  - Euphorbia neobosseri var. neobosseri (s)
- Euphorbia neocaledonica Boiss.
- Euphorbia neocapitata Bruyns (s) (= Monadenium capitatum)
- Euphorbia neococcinea Bruyns (s) (= Monadenium coccineum)
- Euphorbia neocrispa Bruyns (s) (= Monadenium crispum)
- Euphorbia neocymosa Bruyns (s) (= Synadenium cymosum)
- Euphorbia neoerubescens Bruyns (s) (= Lortia erubescens, Monadenium erubescens)
- Euphorbia neogillettii Bruyns (s) (= Monadenium gillettii)
- Euphorbia neoglabrata Bruyns (s) (= Synadenium glabratum)
- Euphorbia neoglaucescens Bruyns (s) (= Synadenium glaucescens)
- Euphorbia neogoetzei Bruyns (s) (= Monadenium goetzei)
- Euphorbia neogossweileri Bruyns (s) (= Monadenium gossweileri, Endadenium gossweileri)
- Euphorbia neogracilis Bruyns (s) (= Monadenium gracile)
- Euphorbia neohalipedicola Bruyns (s) (= Synadenium halipedicola)
- Euphorbia neohumbertii Boiteau (s)
- Euphorbia neomontana Bruyns (s) (= Monadenium montanum)
- Euphorbia neoparviflora Bruyns (s) (= Monadenium parviflorum)
- Euphorbia neopedunculata Bruyns (s) (= Monadenium pedunculatum)
- Euphorbia neopolycnemoides Pax & K.Hoffmann
- Euphorbia neoreflexa Bruyns (s) (= Monadenium reflexum)
- Euphorbia neorubella Bruyns (s) (= Monadenium montanum var. rubellum,/ Monadenium rubellum)
- Euphorbia neorugosa Bruyns (s) (= Monadenium rugosum)
- Euphorbia neospinescens Bruyns (s) (= Stenadenium spinescens, Monadenium spinescens)
- Euphorbia neostapeliodes Bruyns (s) (= Monadenium stapelioides)
  - Euphorbia neostapeliodes var. congesta (P.R.O.Bally) Bruyns (s) (= Monadenium stapelioides var. congestum)
  - Euphorbia neostapeliodes var. neostapeliodes (s) (= Monadenium stapelioides var. stapelioides)
- Euphorbia neostolonifera Bruyns (s) (= Monadenium rhizophorum var. stoloniferum, Monadenium stoloniferum)
- Euphorbia neovirgata Bruyns (s) (= Monadenium virgatum)
- Euphorbia nephradenia Barneby - Pana spurge
- Euphorbia nereidum Jahandiez & Maire
- Euphorbia neriifolia L. (s) - Indian spurgetree, hedge euphorbia
- Euphorbia nesemannii R.A.Dyer (s)
- Euphorbia nevadensis Boiss. & Reut.
- Euphorbia nicaeensis All.
  - Euphorbia nicaeensis subsp. glareosa (Pall. ex M.Bieb.) Radcl.-Sm.
  - Euphorbia nicaeensis subsp. cadrilateri (Prod.) B.Kuzmanov
  - Euphorbia nicaeensis subsp. goldei (Prod.) Greuter & Burdet
  - Euphorbia nicaeensis subsp. lasiocarpa (Boiss.) Radcl.-Sm. & Govaerts
  - Euphorbia nicaeensis subsp. latibracteata (Prod.) B.Kuzmanov
  - Euphorbia nicaeensis subsp. maleevii (Tamamshyan) Oudejans
  - Euphorbia nicaeensis subsp. nicaeensis
  - Euphorbia nicaeensis subsp. prostrata (Fiori) Arrigoni
  - Euphorbia nicaeensis subsp. stepposa (Zoz) Greuter & Burdet
  - Euphorbia nicaeensis subsp. volgensis (Krysht.) Oudejans
- Euphorbia nicholasii Oudejans
- Euphorbia niciciana Borbás
- Euphorbia nigrispina N.E.Br.
- Euphorbia nigrispinoides M.G.Gilbert (s)
- Euphorbia niqueroana Urb.
- Euphorbia nivulia Buch.-Ham. (s)
- Euphorbia nocens (L.C.Wheeler) V.W.Steinm.
- Euphorbia nodosa Houtt.
- Euphorbia nogalensis (A.Hässl.) S.Carter (s)
- Euphorbia norfolkiana Boiss. (s)
- Euphorbia normannii Schmalh. ex Lipsky
- Euphorbia notoptera Boiss.
- Euphorbia novorossica Dubovik
- Euphorbia noxia Pax (s)
- Euphorbia nubica N.E.Br. (s)
- Euphorbia nubigena L.C.Leach (s)
  - Euphorbia nubigena var. nubigena (s)
  - Euphorbia nubigena var. rutilans L.C.Leach (s)
- Euphorbia nudicaulis Perr. (s)
- Euphorbia nummularia Hook.f.
- Euphorbia nutans Lag.
- Euphorbia nyassae Pax (s)
- Euphorbia nyikae Pax (s)
  - Euphorbia nyikae var. neovolkensii (Pax) S.Carter (s)
  - Euphorbia nyikae var. nyikae (s)

== O ==
- Euphorbia oatesii Rolfe (s)
- Euphorbia oaxacana B.L.Rob. & Greenm. (s)
- Euphorbia obconica Bojer ex N.E.Br.
- Euphorbia obcordata Balf.f. (s)
- Euphorbia obesa Hook.f. (s)
  - Euphorbia obesa subsp. obesa (s)
  - Euphorbia obesa subsp. symmetrica (A.C.White, R.A.Dyer & B.Sloane) G.D.Rowley (s)
- Euphorbia oblanceolata Balf.f. (s)
- Euphorbia obliqua F.Bauer ex Endl.
- Euphorbia oblongata Griseb - Eggleaf spurge, oblong spurge
- Euphorbia oblongifolia (K.Koch) K.Koch
- Euphorbia obovata Decne. (s)
- Euphorbia obtusata Pursh
- Euphorbia occidentaustralica Radcl.-Sm. & Govaerts
- Euphorbia ocellata Durand & Hilg.
  - Euphorbia ocellata subsp. arenicola (Parisch) Oudejans
  - Euphorbia ocellata subsp. ocellata
  - Euphorbia ocellata subsp. rattanii (S.Watson) Oudejans
- Euphorbia octoradiata H.Lév. & Vaniot ex H.Lév.
- Euphorbia ocymoidea L.
- Euphorbia odontadenia Boiss.
- Euphorbia odontophora S.Carter (s)
- Euphorbia oerstediana (Klotzsch & Garcke ex Klotzsch) Boiss. - West Indian spurge
- Euphorbia officinalis Forssk.
- Euphorbia officinarum L. (s)
- Euphorbia ogadenensis P.R.O.Bally & S.Carter (s)
- Euphorbia oidorhiza Pojark.
- Euphorbia oligoclada L.C.Leach (s)
- Euphorbia olowaluana Sherff ʻAkoko (Island of Hawaiʻi, Maui)
- Euphorbia omariana M.G.Gilbert (s)
- Euphorbia ophthalmica Rers.
- Euphorbia opuntioides Welw. ex Hiern (s)
- Euphorbia orabensis Dinter
- Euphorbia oranensis (Croizat) Subils
- Euphorbia orbiculata Kunth
- Euphorbia orbiculifolia S.Carter (s)
- Euphorbia orbifolia (Alain) Oudejans
- Euphorbia orientalis L.
- Euphorbia origanoides L.
- Euphorbia orizabae Boiss.
- Euphorbia ornithopus Jacq. (s)
- Euphorbia orobanchoides (P.R.O.Bally) Bruyns (s) (= Monadenium orobanchoides)
  - Euphorbia orobanchoides var. calycina (P.R.O.Bally) Bruyns (s) (= Monadenium orobanchoides var. calycinum)
  - Euphorbia orobanchoides var. orobanchoides (s) (= Monadenium orobanchoides var. orobanchoides)
- Euphorbia orphanidis Boiss.
- Euphorbia orthoclada Baker (s)
  - Euphorbia orthoclada subsp. orthoclada (s)
  - Euphorbia orthoclada subsp. vepretorum (Drake) Leandri (s)
- Euphorbia oryctis Dinter
- Euphorbia oschtenica Galushko
- Euphorbia osyridae Boiss.
- Euphorbia osyridiformis Parsa
- Euphorbia otjipembana L.C.Leach (s)
- Euphorbia ouachitana Mayfield
- Euphorbia ovalleana Phil.
- Euphorbia ovata (Klotzsch & Garcke ex Klotzsch) Boiss.
- Euphorbia oxycoccoides Boiss.
- Euphorbia oxyodonta Boiss. & Hausskn. ex Boiss.
- Euphorbia oxyphylla Boiss. (s)
- Euphorbia oxystegia Boiss. (s)
