= Euphorbia hamaderoensis =

Conservation status
- Endangered (IUCN 3.1)

Scientific classification
- Kingdom: Plantae
- Clade: Tracheophytes
- Clade: Angiosperms
- Clade: Eudicots
- Clade: Rosids
- Order: Malpighiales
- Family: Euphorbiaceae
- Genus: Euphorbia
- Species: E. hamaderoensis

Binomial name
- Euphorbia hamaderoensis A.G.Mill.

Species of flowering plant

Euphorbia hamaderoensis is a species of plant in the family Euphorbiaceae. It is endemic to Socotra in Yemen. Its natural habitat is rocky areas.
