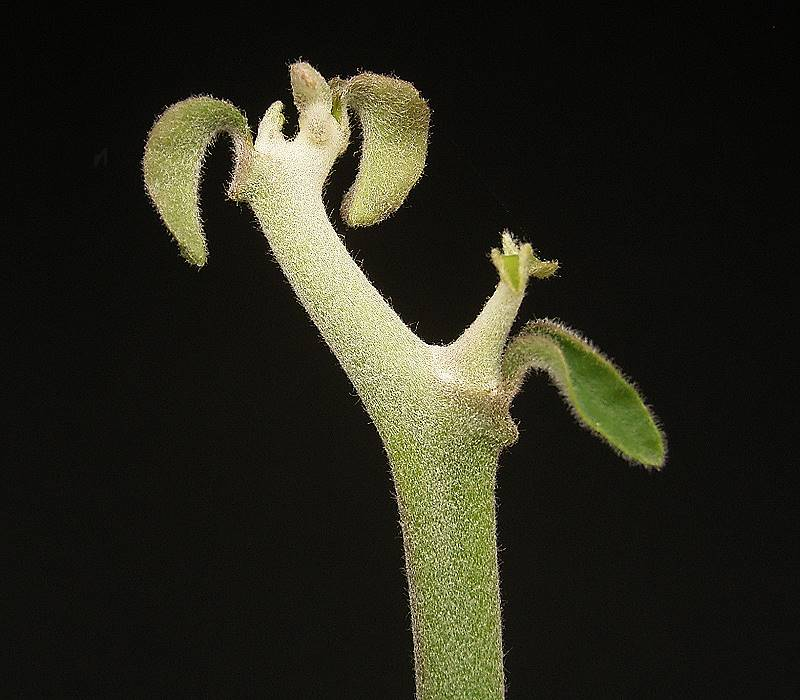

Conservation status
- Critically Endangered (IUCN 3.1)

Scientific classification
- Kingdom: Plantae
- Clade: Tracheophytes
- Clade: Angiosperms
- Clade: Eudicots
- Clade: Rosids
- Order: Malpighiales
- Family: Euphorbiaceae
- Genus: Euphorbia
- Species: E. kamponii

Binomial name
- Euphorbia kamponii Rauh & Petignat

= Euphorbia kamponii =

Species of flowering plant

Euphorbia kamponii is a species of plant in the family Euphorbiaceae. It is endemic to Madagascar. Its natural habitats are subtropical or tropical dry forests and subtropical or tropical dry shrubland. It is threatened by habitat loss.

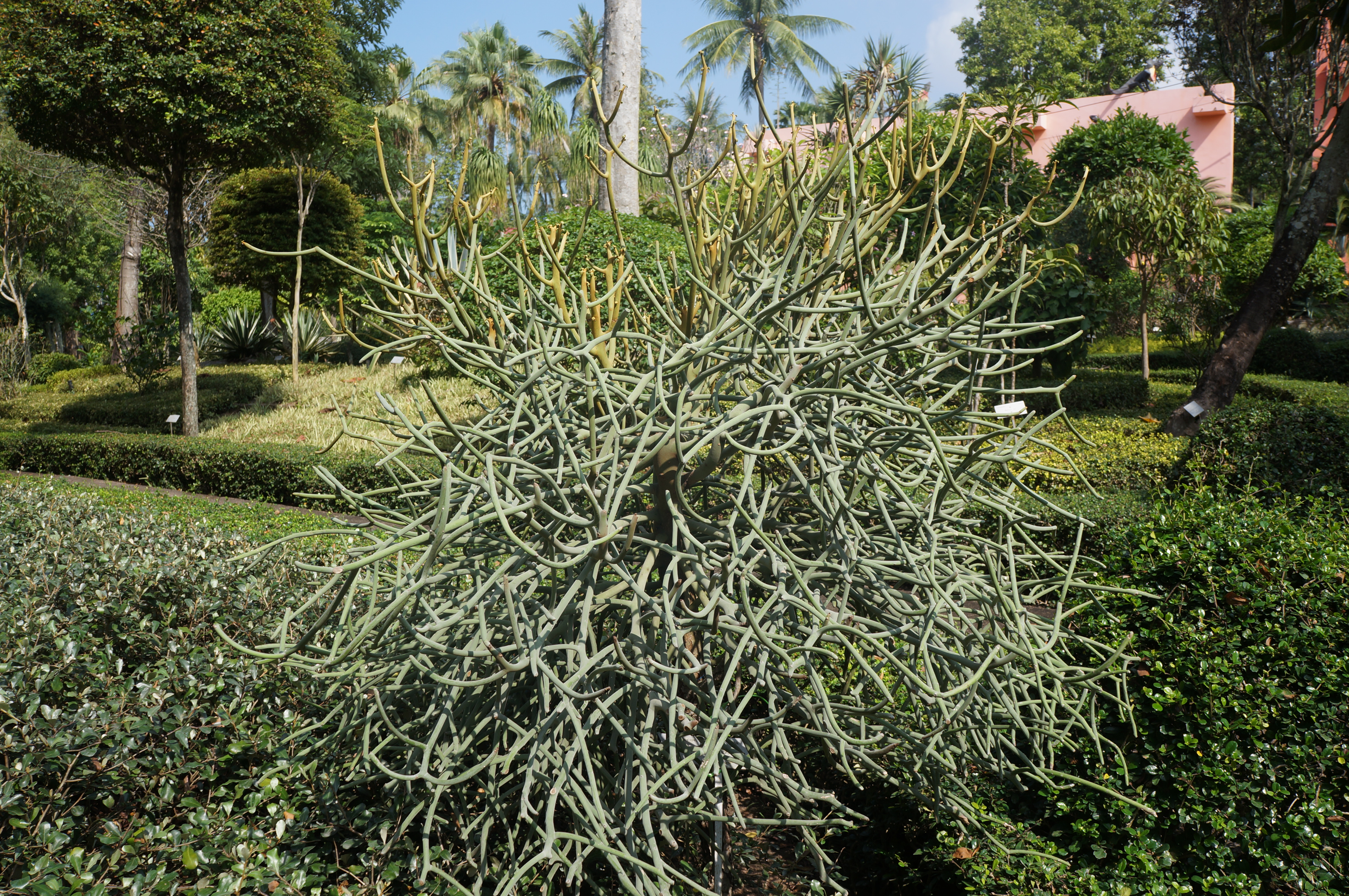
Euphorbia kamponii in the Botanical Garden Nong Nooch. Pattaya.
