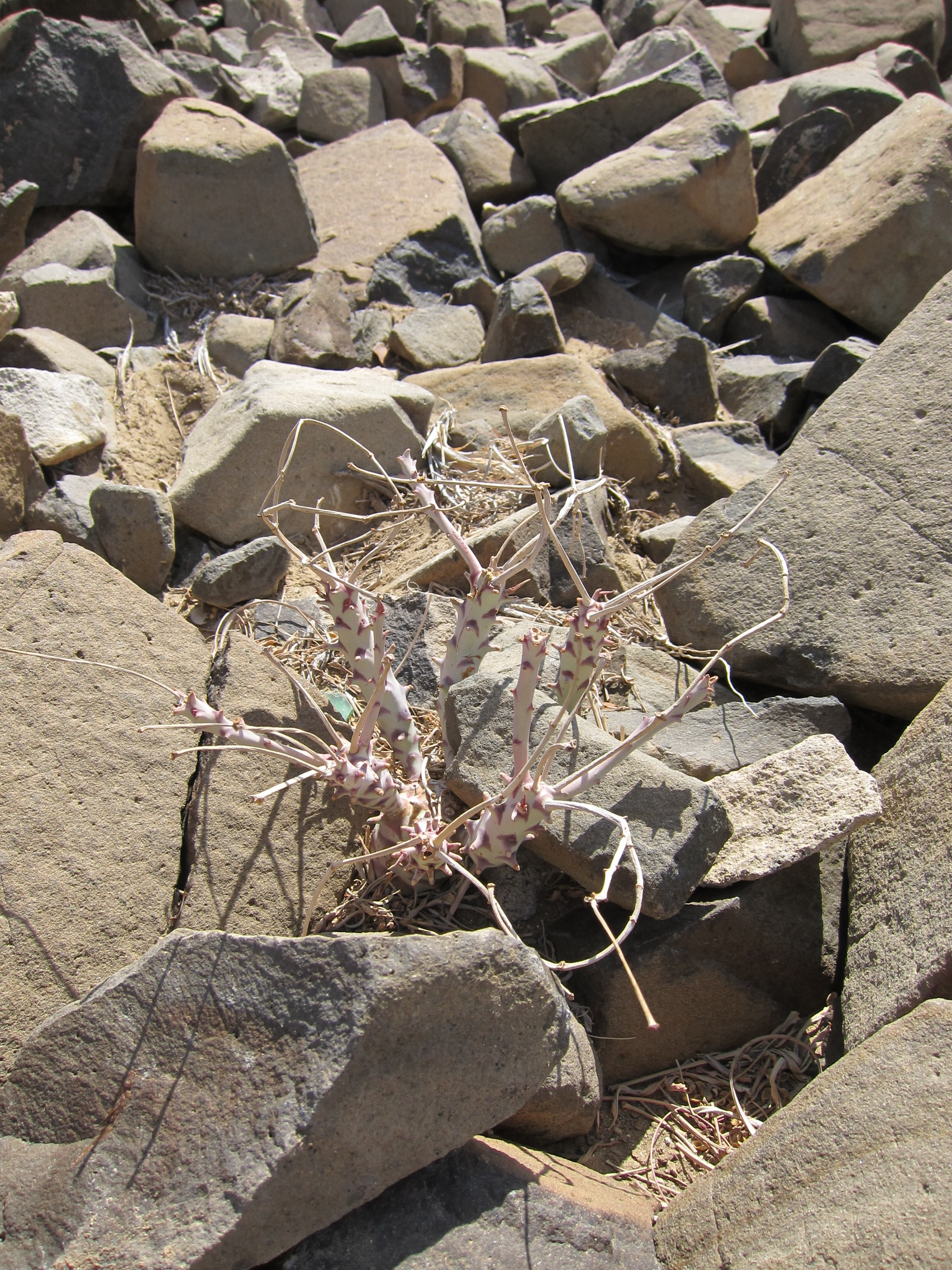

Scientific classification
- Kingdom: Plantae
- Clade: Tracheophytes
- Clade: Angiosperms
- Clade: Eudicots
- Clade: Rosids
- Order: Malpighiales
- Family: Euphorbiaceae
- Genus: Euphorbia
- Species: E. longituberculosa

Binomial name
- Euphorbia longituberculosa Boiss.

= Euphorbia longituberculosa =

Species of flowering plant

Euphorbia longituberculosa is a species of flowering plant in the family Euphorbiaceae, endemic to the Arabian Peninsula and North-east Africa. It inhabits rocky terrain, sheltered among stones or under small shrubs; from sea level to 1,800 m (5,900 ft).

== Description ==
Euphorbia longituberculosa has a height of 15–30 cm (5.9–11.8 in) with a tapering root. The stem grows to a height of 8 cm with a thickness of 4 cm which is tuberculate. E. longituberculosa has linear-lanceolate leaves of 0.3–1 cm (0.12–0.39 in) with similar bracts but smaller.
