= Euphorbia hooveri =

Conservation status
- Threatened (ESA)

Scientific classification
- Kingdom: Plantae
- Clade: Tracheophytes
- Clade: Angiosperms
- Clade: Eudicots
- Clade: Rosids
- Order: Malpighiales
- Family: Euphorbiaceae
- Genus: Euphorbia
- Species: E. hooveri

Binomial name
- Euphorbia hooveri L.C.Wheeler

Synonyms
- Chamaesyce hooveri

Species of flowering plant

Euphorbia hooveri is a species of euphorb known by the common names Hoover's sandmat and Hoover's spurge. It is endemic to California, where it grows in the rare vernal pools of the Central Valley. Due to the elimination of most of its habitat, it became a federally listed threatened species in 1997.

This is an annual herb forming flat mats of thin, hairless stems. The stems are ringed with pairs of tiny, minutely toothed round leaves, each gray-green leaf blade only a few millimeters wide. The inflorescence is a cyathium only two millimeters wide. The cyathium is made up of flat, white appendages surrounding a single minute female flower within a cluster of several male flowers. The female flower develops into a spherical fruit containing white seed. The seeds germinate once the pool evaporates with the arrival of summer.

The vernal pools of the Central Valley have nearly disappeared as the land there has been consumed for agriculture and development. This plant occurs in the center of a vernal pool, usually in the deepest part that becomes a mudflat as the pool dries. The plant grows from the cracks in the drying mud. Another threat to the species is invasive plant species that move into its habitat.
