= Euphorbia nereidum =

Scientific classification
- Kingdom: Plantae
- Clade: Embryophytes
- Clade: Tracheophytes
- Clade: Spermatophytes
- Clade: Angiosperms
- Clade: Eudicots
- Clade: Rosids
- Order: Malpighiales
- Family: Euphorbiaceae
- Genus: Euphorbia
- Species: E. nereidum

Binomial name
- Euphorbia nereidum Jahand. & Maire

Synonyms
- Tithymalus nereidum (Jahand. & Maire) Soják

Species of flowering plant

Euphorbia nereidum, called the nerium-leaved spurge, is a species of flowering plant in the genus Euphorbia, native to Morocco. It has gained the Royal Horticultural Society's Award of Garden Merit.
