= Craib =

Craib is a surname. Notable people with the surname include:

- Ian Craib (1945–2002), British sociologist and psychotherapist
- James Craib (1917–1994), English cricketer
- Mark Craib (born 1970), Scottish footballer
- William Grant Craib (1882–1933), British botanist
