= Euphorbia kischenensis =

Conservation status
- Least Concern (IUCN 3.1)

Scientific classification
- Kingdom: Plantae
- Clade: Tracheophytes
- Clade: Angiosperms
- Clade: Eudicots
- Clade: Rosids
- Order: Malpighiales
- Family: Euphorbiaceae
- Genus: Euphorbia
- Species: E. kischenensis

Binomial name
- Euphorbia kischenensis Vierh.

Species of flowering plant

Euphorbia kischenensis is a species of plant in the family Euphorbiaceae. It is endemic to Socotra in Yemen. Its natural habitats are subtropical or tropical dry forests and subtropical or tropical dry shrubland.
