= Euphorbia kopetdaghi =

Scientific classification
- Kingdom: Plantae
- Clade: Tracheophytes
- Clade: Angiosperms
- Clade: Eudicots
- Clade: Rosids
- Order: Malpighiales
- Family: Euphorbiaceae
- Genus: Euphorbia
- Species: E. kopetdaghi

Binomial name
- Euphorbia kopetdaghi (Prokh.) Prokh.

Synonyms
- Euphorbia aellenii; Euphorbia fuhsii; Tithymalus aellenii; Tithymalus kopetdaghi

Plant species in the spurge family

Euphorbia kopetdaghi is a species of spurge that grows in the steppes of Iran and Turkmenistan, and might also be native to parts of Afghanistan.

== Description ==
Euphorbia kopetdaghi is a perennial herbaceous plant growing 20 to 50 centimeters tall. Its stems branch from the base of the plant and are both hairless and glaucous; the upright stems grow from woody roots.

The leaves are attached to the stems alternately and do not have stipules. They are oblong-lanceolate measuring 2.5–3.5 cm long and 4.5–6.0 millimeters wide with smooth to just barely toothed edges. Their color is light green to yellowish green and they usually have a narrow point and always have a tapering base. Under the inflorescence there is a group of five bract-like leaves attached around the stem that are oblong to elliptic-lanceolate in shape. Above this the there are five stalks of the inflorescence that are almost like an umbel, that end in two wide bract-like leaves that are ovate to lanceolate. From this node one to three stalks support the flowers which are called cyathia.

== Taxonomy ==
Euphorbia kopetdaghi was first described by Jaroslav Ivanovic Prokhanov in 1933 as a species in the Tithymalus genus. However, Prokhanov then moved it to Euphorbia in 1949. A 2018 DNA study found it is closely related to Euphorbia acanthodes, Euphorbia polycaulis, and Euphorbia malleata. Together with the rest of the genus it is part of the Euphorbiaceae family and the species has a total of four synonyms.

Table of Synonyms
Name	Year	Notes
Euphorbia aellenii Rech.f.	1951	= het.
Euphorbia fuhsii Bornm. & Sint. ex Prokh.	1933	= het., pro syn.
Tithymalus aellenii (Rech.f.) Soják	1972	= het.
Tithymalus kopetdaghi Prokh.	1933	≡ hom.
Notes: ≡ homotypic synonym; = heterotypic synonym

== Range and habitat ==
According to Plants of the World Online this species is native to northeastern Iran and southern Turkmenistan, however a 2018 scientific article about this and other species of spurges in Iran also reported it as native to northwestern Afghanistan. It grows on slopes in the steppe biome.
