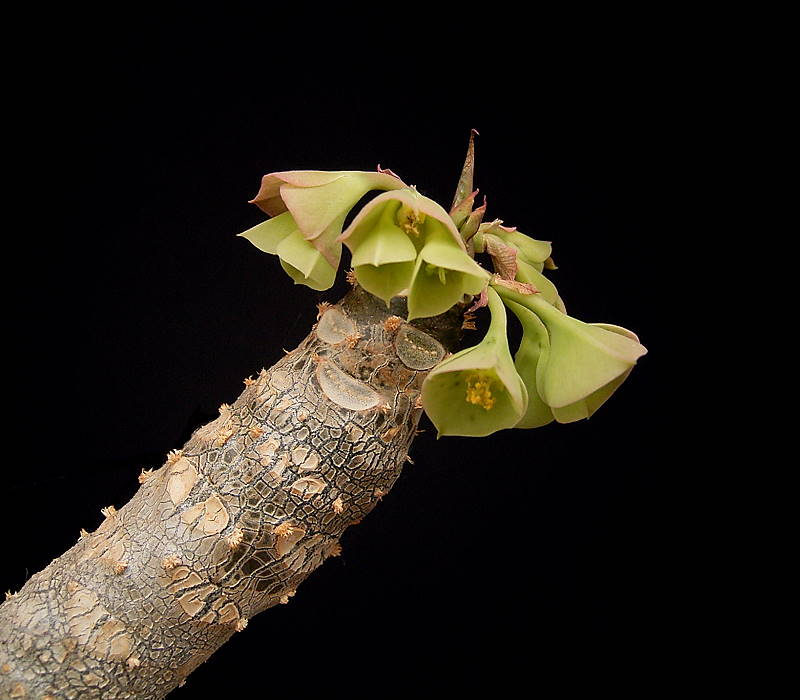

Conservation status
- Critically Endangered (IUCN 3.1)

Scientific classification
- Kingdom: Plantae
- Clade: Tracheophytes
- Clade: Angiosperms
- Clade: Eudicots
- Clade: Rosids
- Order: Malpighiales
- Family: Euphorbiaceae
- Genus: Euphorbia
- Species: E. millotii

Binomial name
- Euphorbia millotii Ursch & Leandri

= Euphorbia millotii =

Species of flowering plant

Euphorbia millotii is a species of flowering plant in the family Euphorbiaceae. It is endemic to Madagascar. Its natural habitat is subtropical or tropical moist shrubland. It is threatened by habitat loss.
