= Euphorbia otjipembana =

Conservation status
- Vulnerable (IUCN 3.1)

Scientific classification
- Kingdom: Plantae
- Clade: Tracheophytes
- Clade: Angiosperms
- Clade: Eudicots
- Clade: Rosids
- Order: Malpighiales
- Family: Euphorbiaceae
- Genus: Euphorbia
- Species: E. otjipembana

Binomial name
- Euphorbia otjipembana L.C.Leach

Species of flowering plant

Euphorbia otjipembana is a species of plant in the family Euphorbiaceae. It is endemic to Namibia. Its natural habitat is subtropical or tropical dry shrubland.

Since 30 April 2004, the species has been classified as vulnerable in the IUCN Red List.
