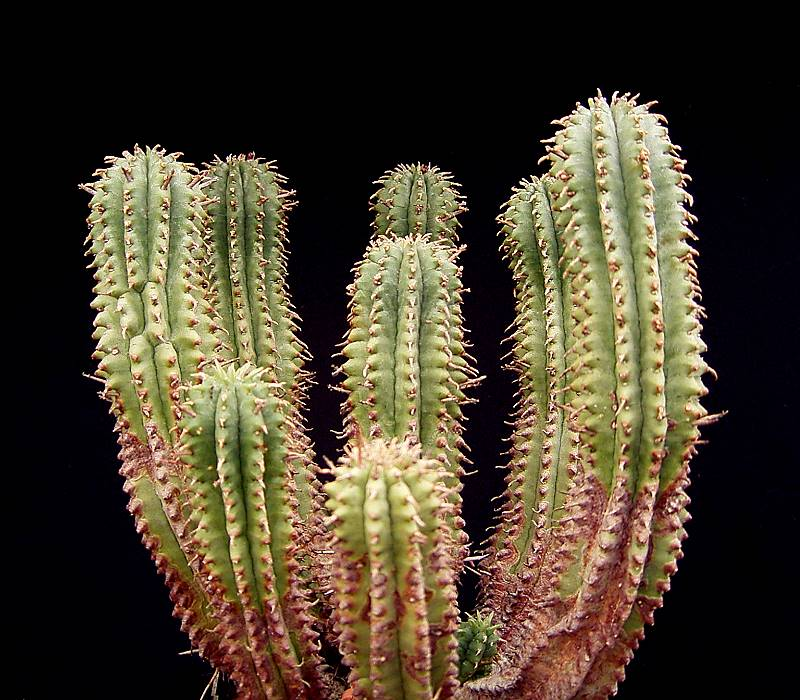

Scientific classification
- Kingdom: Plantae
- Clade: Tracheophytes
- Clade: Angiosperms
- Clade: Eudicots
- Clade: Rosids
- Order: Malpighiales
- Family: Euphorbiaceae
- Genus: Euphorbia
- Species: E. inconstantia

Binomial name
- Euphorbia inconstantia R.A.Dyer

= Euphorbia inconstantia =

Species of flowering plant

Euphorbia inconstantia is a species of plant in the genus Euphorbia and the family Euphorbiaceae.
