= Euphorbia microsciadia =

Scientific classification
- Kingdom: Plantae
- Clade: Tracheophytes
- Clade: Angiosperms
- Clade: Eudicots
- Clade: Rosids
- Order: Malpighiales
- Family: Euphorbiaceae
- Genus: Euphorbia
- Species: E. microsciadia

Binomial name
- Euphorbia microsciadia Boiss.

Species of flowering plant

Euphorbia microsciadia is a species of flowering plant in the spurge family, Euphorbiaceae, native to western Asia. It grows in semidesert in rocky and sandy soils.
