= Euphorbia herman-schwartzii =

Conservation status
- Endangered (IUCN 3.1)

Scientific classification
- Kingdom: Plantae
- Clade: Tracheophytes
- Clade: Angiosperms
- Clade: Eudicots
- Clade: Rosids
- Order: Malpighiales
- Family: Euphorbiaceae
- Genus: Euphorbia
- Species: E. herman-schwartzii

Binomial name
- Euphorbia herman-schwartzii Rauh

Species of flowering plant

Euphorbia herman-schwartzii is a species of plant in the family Euphorbiaceae. It is endemic to Madagascar. Its natural habitats are subtropical or tropical dry forests and rocky areas. It is threatened by habitat loss.
