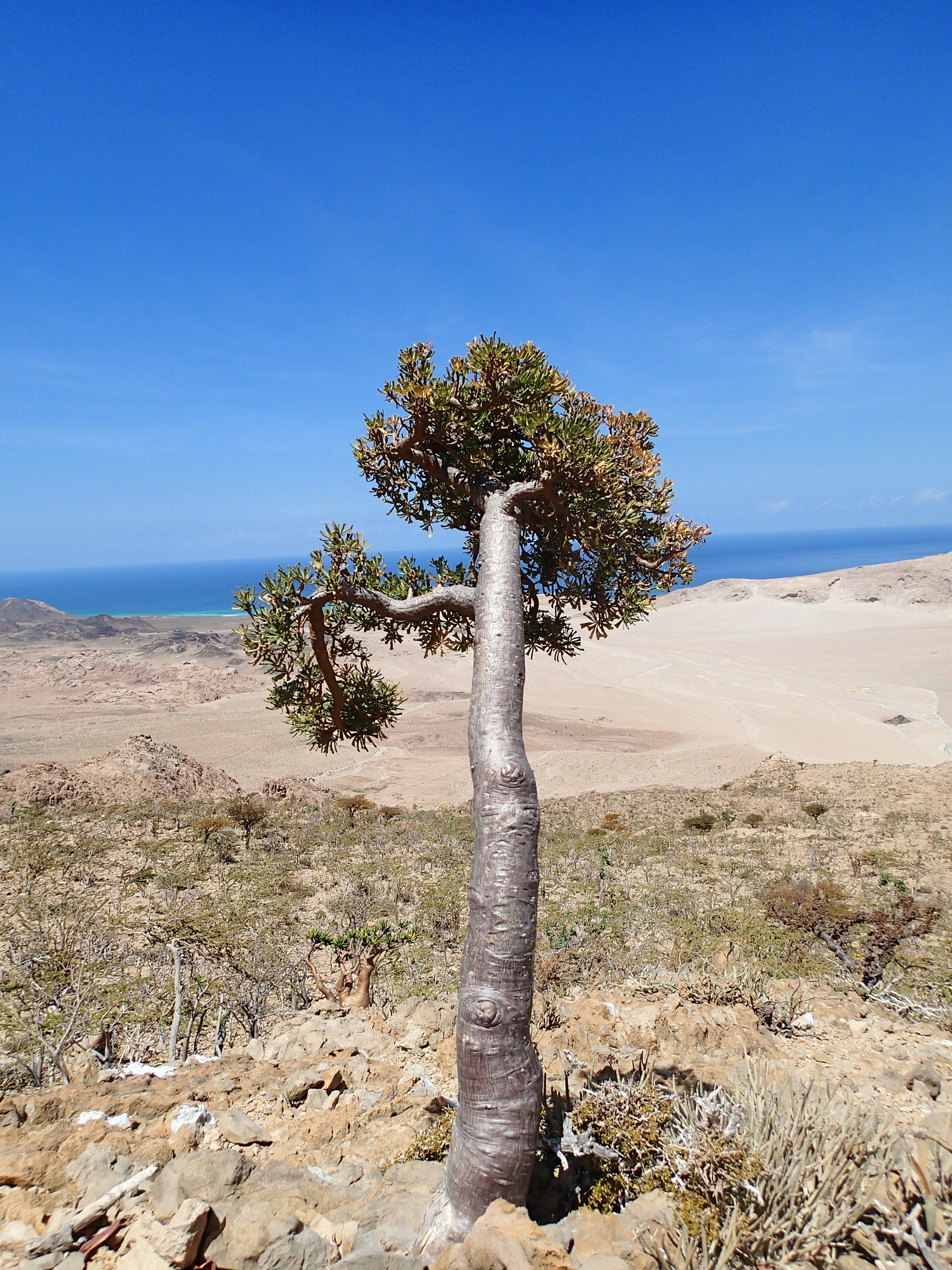

Scientific classification
- Kingdom: Plantae
- Clade: Tracheophytes
- Clade: Angiosperms
- Clade: Eudicots
- Clade: Rosids
- Order: Malpighiales
- Family: Euphorbiaceae
- Genus: Euphorbia
- Species: E. marie-cladieae

Binomial name
- Euphorbia marie-cladieae Rzepecky

= Euphorbia marie-cladieae =

Species of flowering plant

Euphorbia marie-cladieae is a species of flowering plant in the family Euphorbiaceae. It is endemic to Socotra, Yemen, where it is found in western tip of the island.
