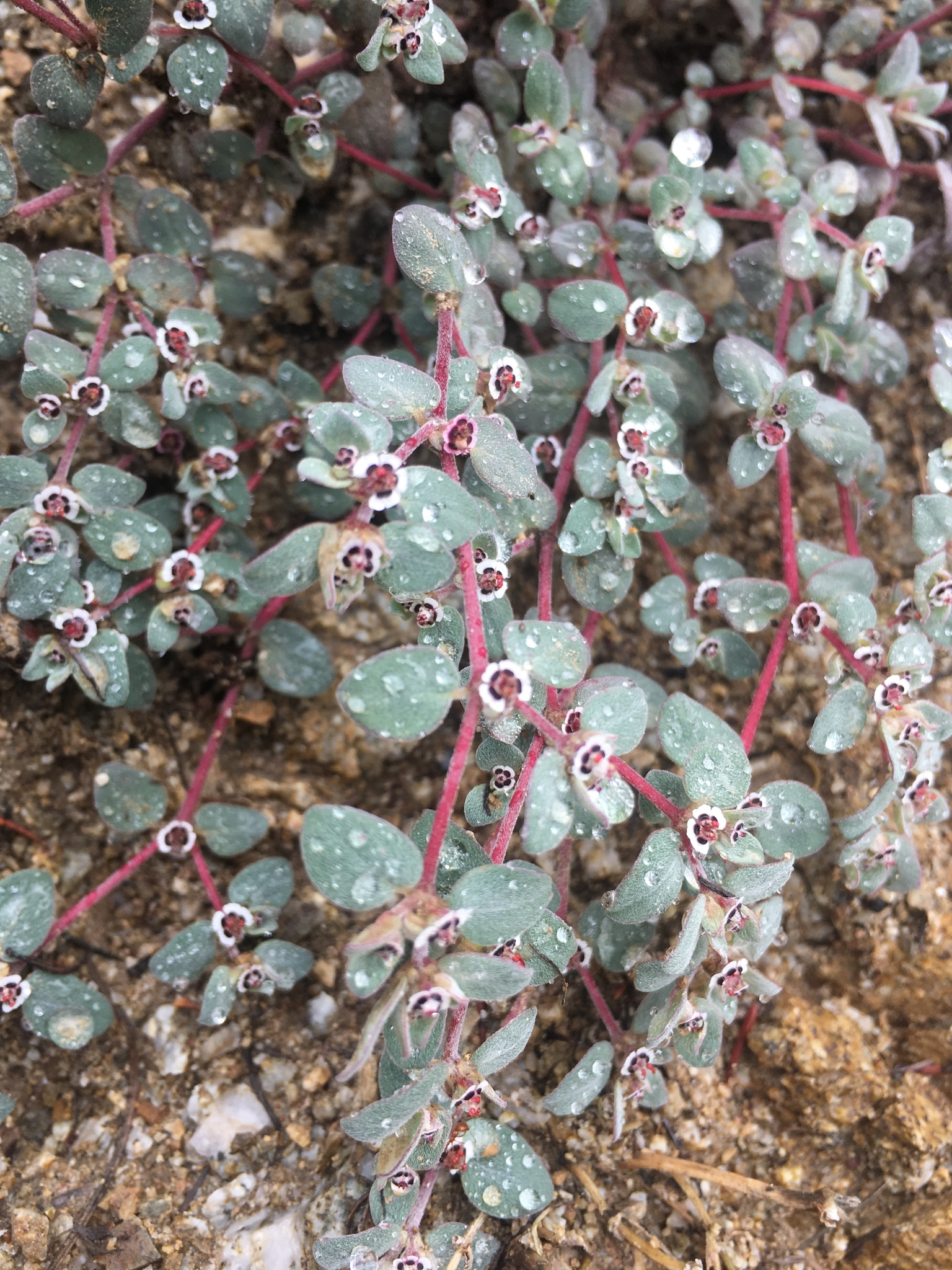

Scientific classification
- Kingdom: Plantae
- Clade: Tracheophytes
- Clade: Angiosperms
- Clade: Eudicots
- Clade: Rosids
- Order: Malpighiales
- Family: Euphorbiaceae
- Genus: Euphorbia
- Species: E. melanadenia

Binomial name
- Euphorbia melanadenia Torr.

Synonyms
- Chamaesyce melanadenia

= Euphorbia melanadenia =

Species of flowering plant

Euphorbia melanadenia is a species of Euphorbia known by the common name red-gland spurge. It is native to the deserts and mountains of Baja California and southern California and Arizona, where it grows in dry, rocky habitat. It is a perennial herb forming a small clump or mat of very slender, tangling red stems. The stems are lined with pairs of slightly woolly oval-shaped leaves 2 to 9 millimeters wide. The tiny inflorescence is a cyathium less than 2 millimeters wide. The cyathium is a bell-shaped array of white, scalloped petal-like appendages surrounding the actual flowers. Each appendage has at its base a shiny red nectar gland. At the center of the appendages is a ring of male staminate flowers around a single female flower. The female flower develops into an oval-shaped fruit which bears wrinkled white seeds.
