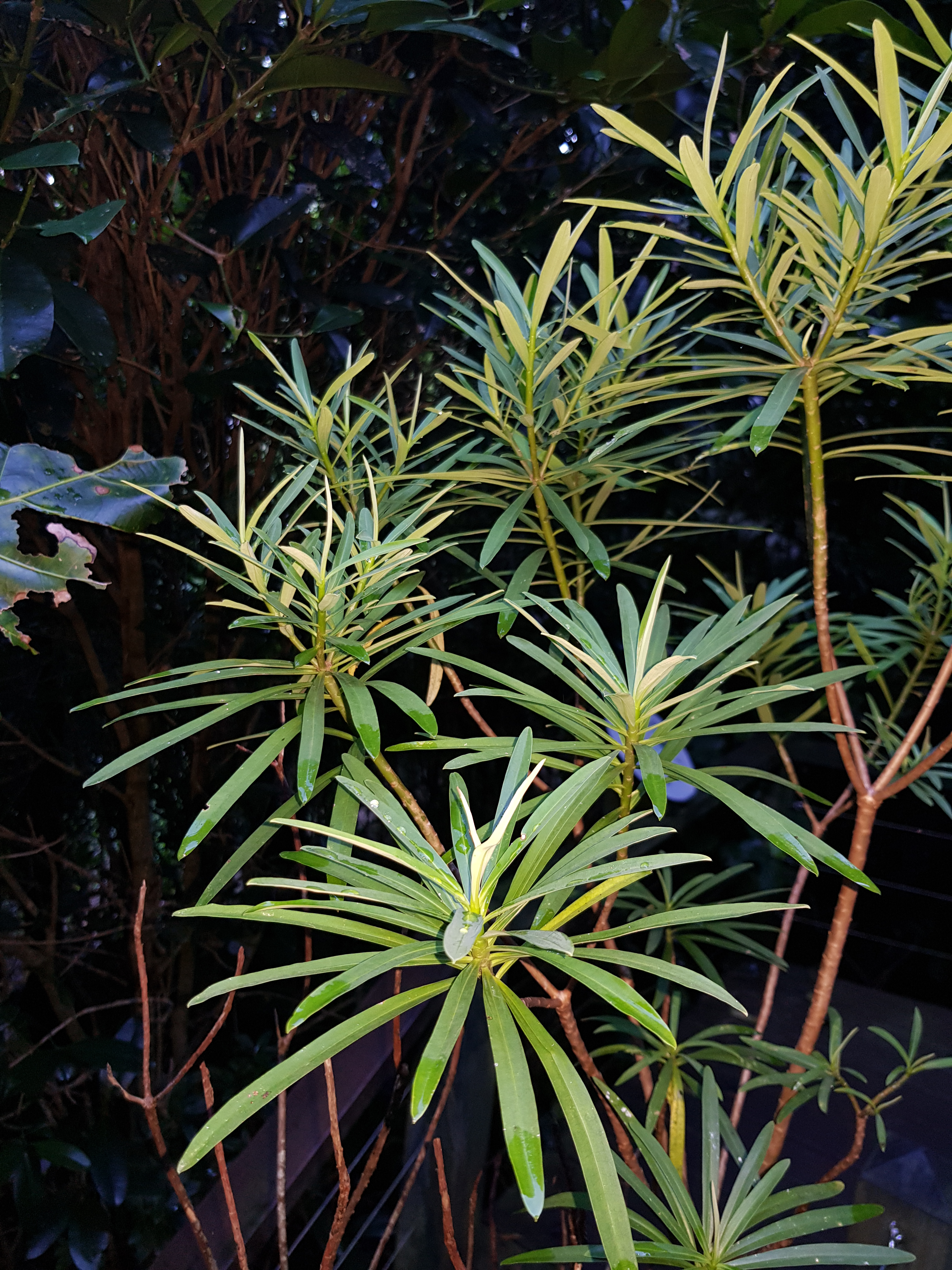

Conservation status
- Critically endangered (EPBC Act)

Scientific classification
- Kingdom: Plantae
- Clade: Embryophytes
- Clade: Tracheophytes
- Clade: Spermatophytes
- Clade: Angiosperms
- Clade: Eudicots
- Clade: Rosids
- Order: Malpighiales
- Family: Euphorbiaceae
- Genus: Euphorbia
- Species: E. norfolkiana

Binomial name
- Euphorbia norfolkiana Boiss.

= Euphorbia norfolkiana =

Species of flowering plant in the spurge family

Euphorbia norfolkiana, also known as the Norfolk Island euphorbia, is a flowering plant in the spurge family. It is endemic to the Australian external territory of Norfolk Island in the south-west Pacific Ocean. It was originally described in 1862 by Swiss botanist Pierre Edmond Boissier.

== Description ==
The species grows as a dense, low shrub – usually up to 1 m, but sometimes to 3 m in height. It has olive-green flowers.

== Distribution and habitat ==
The plants occur in coastal pine and white oak forest, usually below pines in light shade, with coastal cliff vegetation. The species was formerly more common; its conservation status has been assessed as Critically Endangered, and it is threatened by cattle grazing and competition with invasive weeds.
