= Euphorbia mandravioky =

Conservation status
- Vulnerable (IUCN 3.1)

Scientific classification
- Kingdom: Plantae
- Clade: Tracheophytes
- Clade: Angiosperms
- Clade: Eudicots
- Clade: Rosids
- Order: Malpighiales
- Family: Euphorbiaceae
- Genus: Euphorbia
- Species: E. mandravioky

Binomial name
- Euphorbia mandravioky Leandri

Synonyms
- Euphorbia capuronii Leandri

Species of flowering plant

Euphorbia mandravioky is a species of flowering plant in the family Euphorbiaceae. It is endemic to Madagascar. Its natural habitats are subtropical or tropical dry forests and rocky areas. It is threatened by habitat loss.
