= Euphorbia jamesonii =

Conservation status
- Vulnerable (IUCN 3.1)

Scientific classification
- Kingdom: Plantae
- Clade: Embryophytes
- Clade: Tracheophytes
- Clade: Spermatophytes
- Clade: Angiosperms
- Clade: Eudicots
- Clade: Rosids
- Order: Malpighiales
- Family: Euphorbiaceae
- Genus: Euphorbia
- Species: E. jamesonii

Binomial name
- Euphorbia jamesonii Boiss.

Synonyms
- Chamaesyce jamesonii (Boiss.) G.L.Webster

Species of flowering plant

Euphorbia jamesonii is a species of plant in the family Euphorbiaceae. It is endemic to Ecuador. Its natural habitats are subtropical or tropical moist montane forests and subtropical or tropical dry shrubland.
