= Euphorbia mitchelliana =

Scientific classification
- Kingdom: Plantae
- Clade: Tracheophytes
- Clade: Angiosperms
- Clade: Eudicots
- Clade: Rosids
- Order: Malpighiales
- Family: Euphorbiaceae
- Genus: Euphorbia
- Species: E. mitchelliana

Binomial name
- Euphorbia mitchelliana Boiss.

Varieties
- E. m. var. filipes (Benth.) Halford & W.K.Harris; E. m. var. longiloba Halford & W.K.Harris; E. m. var. mitchelliana

Synonyms
- Chamaesyce alsiniflora; Chamaesyce filipes; Chamaesyce mitchelliana; Euphorbia alsiniflora; Euphorbia filipes

Plant species in the spurge family

Euphorbia mitchelliana is a species in the spurge family that is native to Australia.

== Description ==
The species is an annual or perennial plant that can grow to as much as 80 centimetres in height. It has a woody taproot and will have multiple stems that grow upward, lay upon the ground, or grow outwards with upturned ends.

It leaves are quite narrow, ranging from 1.5 to 30 times longer than they are wide with a length of 0.7 to 7 cm. The width is just 1–12 millimetres. They are linear to lanceolate, narrow-oblong to oblong, elliptic to broadelliptic, or ovate in shape.

== Taxonomy ==
Euphorbia mitchelliana was scientifically described and named in 1862 by Pierre Edmond Boissier. It is part of the large Euphorbia genus which is classified in the Euphorbiaceae family. The species has three accepted varieties.

- Euphorbia mitchelliana var. filipes
- Euphorbia mitchelliana var. longiloba
- Euphorbia mitchelliana var. mitchelliana

Euphorbia mitchelliana has 15 synonyms of the species or of two of its three varieties.

Table of Synonyms
Name	Year	Rank	Synonym of:	Notes
Chamaesyce alsiniflora (Baill.) D.C.Hassall	1976	species	var. filipes	= het.
Chamaesyce filipes (Benth.) D.C.Hassall	1976	species	var. filipes	≡ hom.
Chamaesyce mitchelliana (Boiss.) D.C.Hassall	1976	species	E. mitchelliana	≡ hom.
Chamaesyce mitchelliana var. hirta (Boiss.) D.C.Hassall	1976	variety	var. mitchelliana	= het.
Euphorbia alsiniflora Baill.	1866	species	var. filipes	= het.
Euphorbia filipes Benth.	1873	species	var. filipes	≡ hom.
Euphorbia macgillivrayi var. filipes (Benth.) Domin	1927	variety	var. filipes	≡ hom.
Euphorbia mitchelliana var. cairnsiana Domin	1927	variety	var. mitchelliana	= het.
Euphorbia mitchelliana var. dietrichiae Domin	1927	variety	var. mitchelliana	= het.
Euphorbia mitchelliana var. filifolia Domin	1927	variety	var. mitchelliana	= het.
Euphorbia mitchelliana var. glauca Benth.	1873	variety	var. mitchelliana	= het.
Euphorbia mitchelliana var. hirta Boiss.	1862	variety	var. mitchelliana	= het.
Euphorbia mitchelliana var. oblongifolia Boiss.	1862	variety	var. mitchelliana	= het.
Euphorbia mitchelliana var. obtusifolia Domin	1927	variety	var. mitchelliana	= het.
Euphorbia mitchelliana var. typica Domin	1927	variety	E. mitchelliana	≡ hom., not validly publ.
Notes: ≡ homotypic synonym ; = heterotypic synonym

== Range and habitat ==
Euphorbia mitchelliana is a widespread species in northern Australia. It can be found in Western Australia, the Northern Territory, and Queensland. It typically grows in sandy soils.
