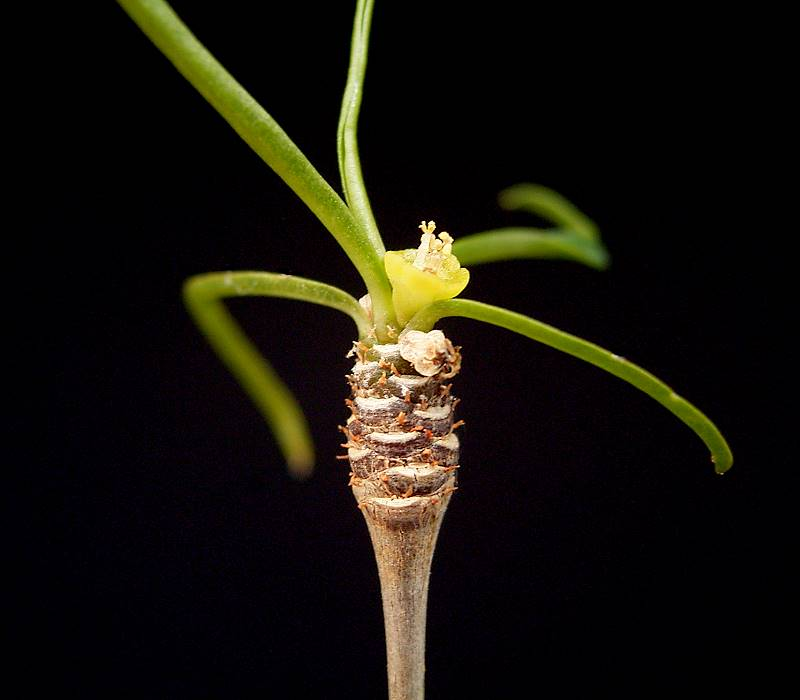

Conservation status
- Endangered (IUCN 3.1)

Scientific classification
- Kingdom: Plantae
- Clade: Tracheophytes
- Clade: Angiosperms
- Clade: Eudicots
- Clade: Rosids
- Order: Malpighiales
- Family: Euphorbiaceae
- Genus: Euphorbia
- Species: E. hedyotoides

Binomial name
- Euphorbia hedyotoides N.E.Br.

= Euphorbia hedyotoides =

Species of flowering plant

Euphorbia hedyotoides is a species of plant in the family Euphorbiaceae. It is endemic to Madagascar. Its natural habitat is subtropical or tropical dry forests. It is threatened by habitat loss.

Euphorbia hedyotoides is dioecious, with male and female flowers on separate plants.
