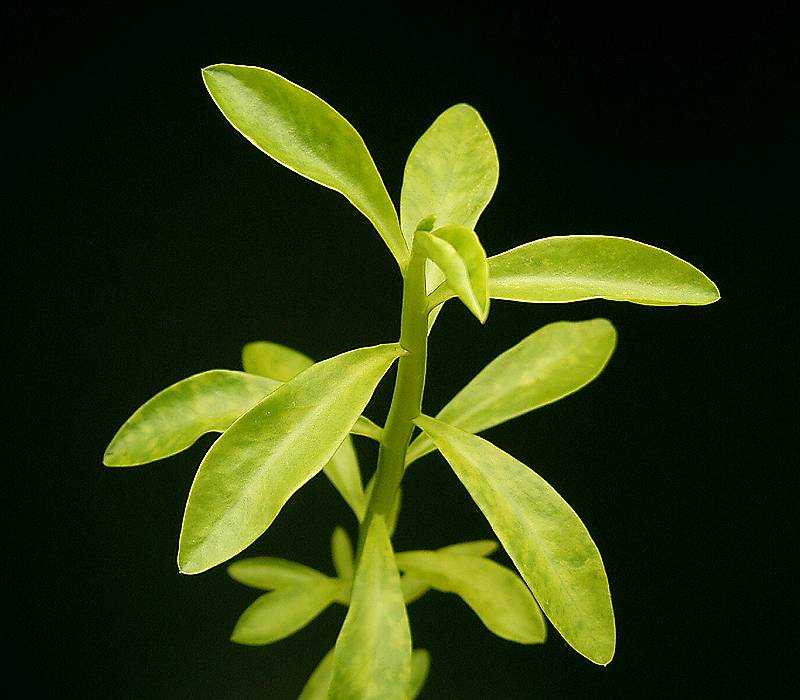

Conservation status
- Least Concern (IUCN 3.1)

Scientific classification
- Kingdom: Plantae
- Clade: Tracheophytes
- Clade: Angiosperms
- Clade: Eudicots
- Clade: Rosids
- Order: Malpighiales
- Family: Euphorbiaceae
- Genus: Euphorbia
- Species: E. orthoclada

Binomial name
- Euphorbia orthoclada Baker

Synonyms
- Euphorbia cynanchoides Drake; Euphorbia lohaensis Baill. Euphorbia vepretorum Drake

= Euphorbia orthoclada =

Species of plant

Euphorbia orthoclada is a species of plant in the family Euphorbiaceae. It is endemic to Madagascar. Its natural habitats are subtropical or tropical dry forests, subtropical or tropical dry shrubland, and rocky areas. It is threatened by habitat loss.
