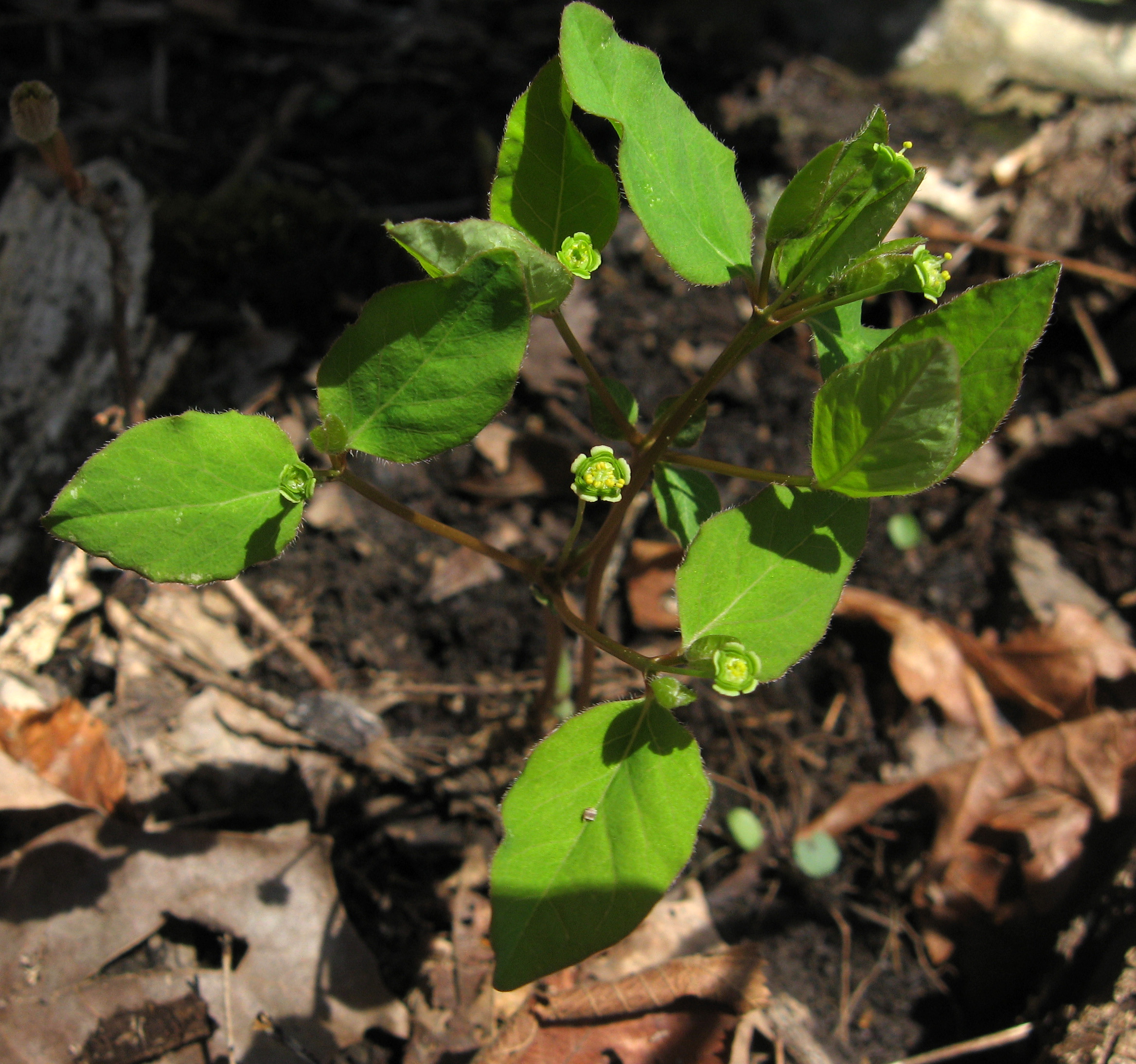

Scientific classification
- Kingdom: Plantae
- Clade: Tracheophytes
- Clade: Angiosperms
- Clade: Eudicots
- Clade: Rosids
- Order: Malpighiales
- Family: Euphorbiaceae
- Genus: Euphorbia
- Species: E. mercurialina

Binomial name
- Euphorbia mercurialina Michx.

= Euphorbia mercurialina =

Species of flowering plant

Euphorbia mercurialina, commonly called mercury spurge, is a species of plant in the spurge family.

It is native to the Southeastern United States, where it is primarily found in the vicinity of the Cumberland Plateau in east Tennessee and northern Alabama, and in the southern Appalachian Mountains. Disjunct populations are also found in the Piedmont of North Carolina. Its natural habitat is in rich forests over calcareous rock.

It flowers and fruits in the spring.
