= Euphorbia namuskluftensis =

Conservation status
- Vulnerable (IUCN 3.1)

Scientific classification
- Kingdom: Plantae
- Clade: Embryophytes
- Clade: Tracheophytes
- Clade: Spermatophytes
- Clade: Angiosperms
- Clade: Eudicots
- Clade: Rosids
- Order: Malpighiales
- Family: Euphorbiaceae
- Genus: Euphorbia
- Species: E. namuskluftensis

Binomial name
- Euphorbia namuskluftensis L.C.Leach

Species of flowering plant

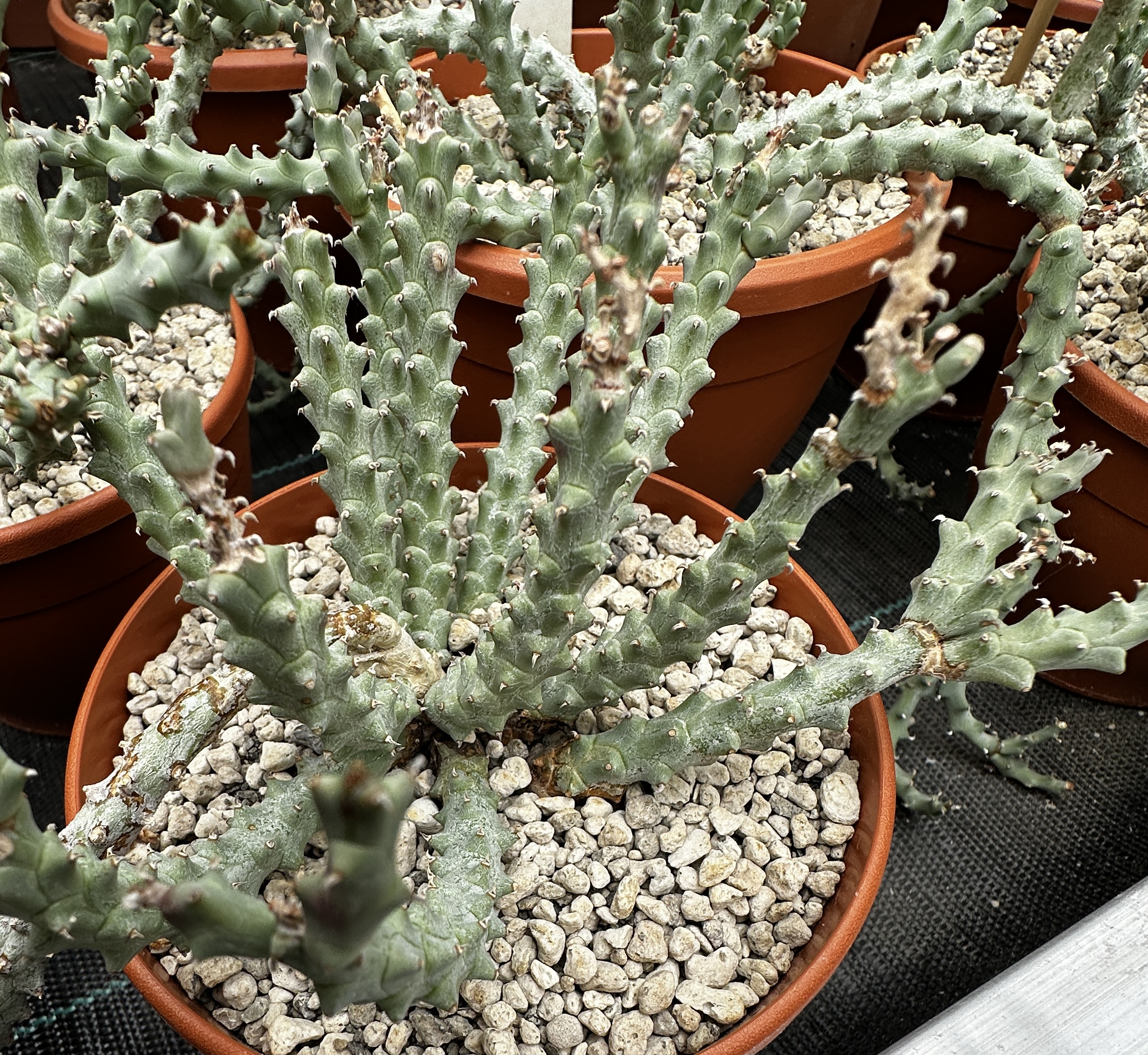
Euphorbia namuskluftensis

Euphorbia namuskluftensis is a species of plant in the family Euphorbiaceae. It is endemic to Namibia. Its natural habitat is rocky areas. Occurs on white limestone on Namuskluft. It is a dwarf non-spiny species. It has tubers and ribosomes, that divide into numerous short branch stems. The branches have tiny sessile caduceus leaves about 2 mm long. They have tiny yellow flowers when they bloom, and are of green coloration. Grows better in mild shade, but do need a place that is bright and warm. Root rot can occur if left in wet soil for too long. Threats include pests and diseases like spider mites and mold.

The fruits of euphorbias are hard, woody capsules, made up of three segments, each containing a relatively large seed. When the capsule ripens, it explodes and scatters the seeds over amazing distances. As euphorbia seeds have a limited shelf-life, they are rarely offered commercially.
