= Euphorbia lurida =

Scientific classification
- Kingdom: Plantae
- Clade: Tracheophytes
- Clade: Angiosperms
- Clade: Eudicots
- Clade: Rosids
- Order: Malpighiales
- Family: Euphorbiaceae
- Genus: Euphorbia
- Species: E. lurida

Binomial name
- Euphorbia lurida Engelm.

Species of flowering plant

Euphorbia lurida is a species of spurge known by the common name woodland spurge. It is native to the southwestern United States from California to Utah, where it can be found in a number of habitats. This is a common perennial herb usually not exceeding half a meter in height. It has small oval green leaves all along its erect stems. The inflorescences at the tips of the stems have tiny glandular flowers with ridged or toothed tips. The fruit is a rounded capsule a few millimeters wide containing tiny gray seeds.
