= Euphorbia kansuensis =

Scientific classification
- Kingdom: Plantae
- Clade: Tracheophytes
- Clade: Angiosperms
- Clade: Eudicots
- Clade: Rosids
- Order: Malpighiales
- Family: Euphorbiaceae
- Genus: Euphorbia
- Species: E. kansuensis

Binomial name
- Euphorbia kansuensis Prokh.

Synonyms
- Euphorbia yinshanica S.Q.Zhou & G.H.Liu

Species of flowering plant

Euphorbia kansuensis is a species of plant in the family Euphorbiaceae, native to China.
