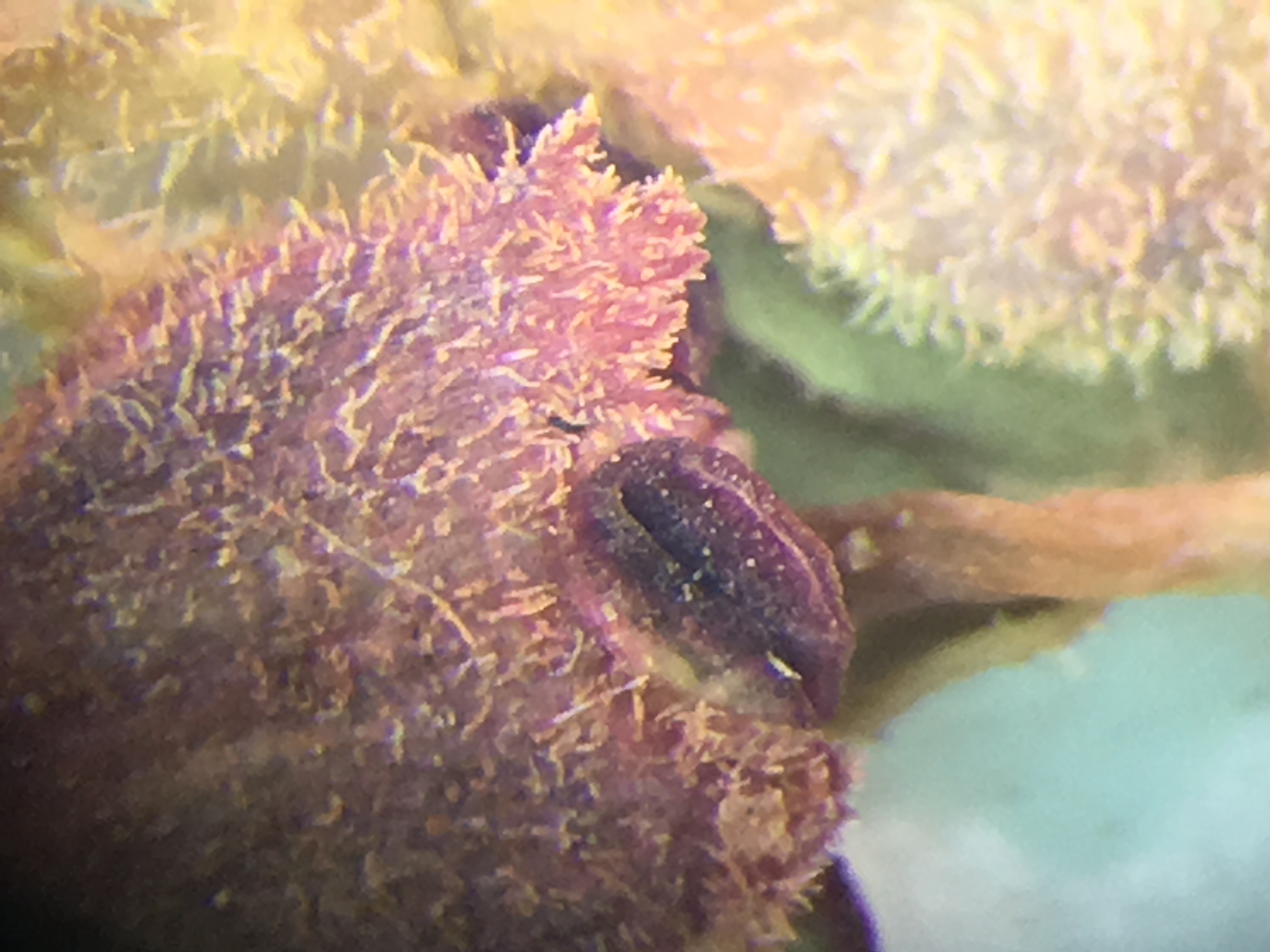
- Euphorbia ocellata subsp. rattanii

Scientific classification
- Kingdom: Plantae
- Clade: Tracheophytes
- Clade: Angiosperms
- Clade: Eudicots
- Clade: Rosids
- Order: Malpighiales
- Family: Euphorbiaceae
- Genus: Euphorbia
- Species: E. ocellata

Binomial name
- Euphorbia ocellata Durand & Hilg.

Synonyms
- Chamaesyce ocellata

= Euphorbia ocellata =

Species of flowering plant

Euphorbia ocellata is a species of Euphorbia known by the common name Contura Creek sandmat. It is native to the southwestern United States where it grows in many types of habitats. This is a small annual herb with pairs of oblong to lance-shaped leaves, each leaf up to about 1.5 centimeters long. The inflorescence is a cyathium only 2 millimeters wide. It consists of petal-like appendages surrounding the actual flowers, each with a round nectar gland at its base. The appendages are sometimes absent. The flowers include one female flower ringed by up to 60 male flowers. The fruit is a lobed, spherical capsule less than 3 millimeters wide.

There are three subspecies. One, the Stony Creek spurge or Rattan's sandmat (ssp. rattanii), is endemic to the northern Sacramento Valley of California.
