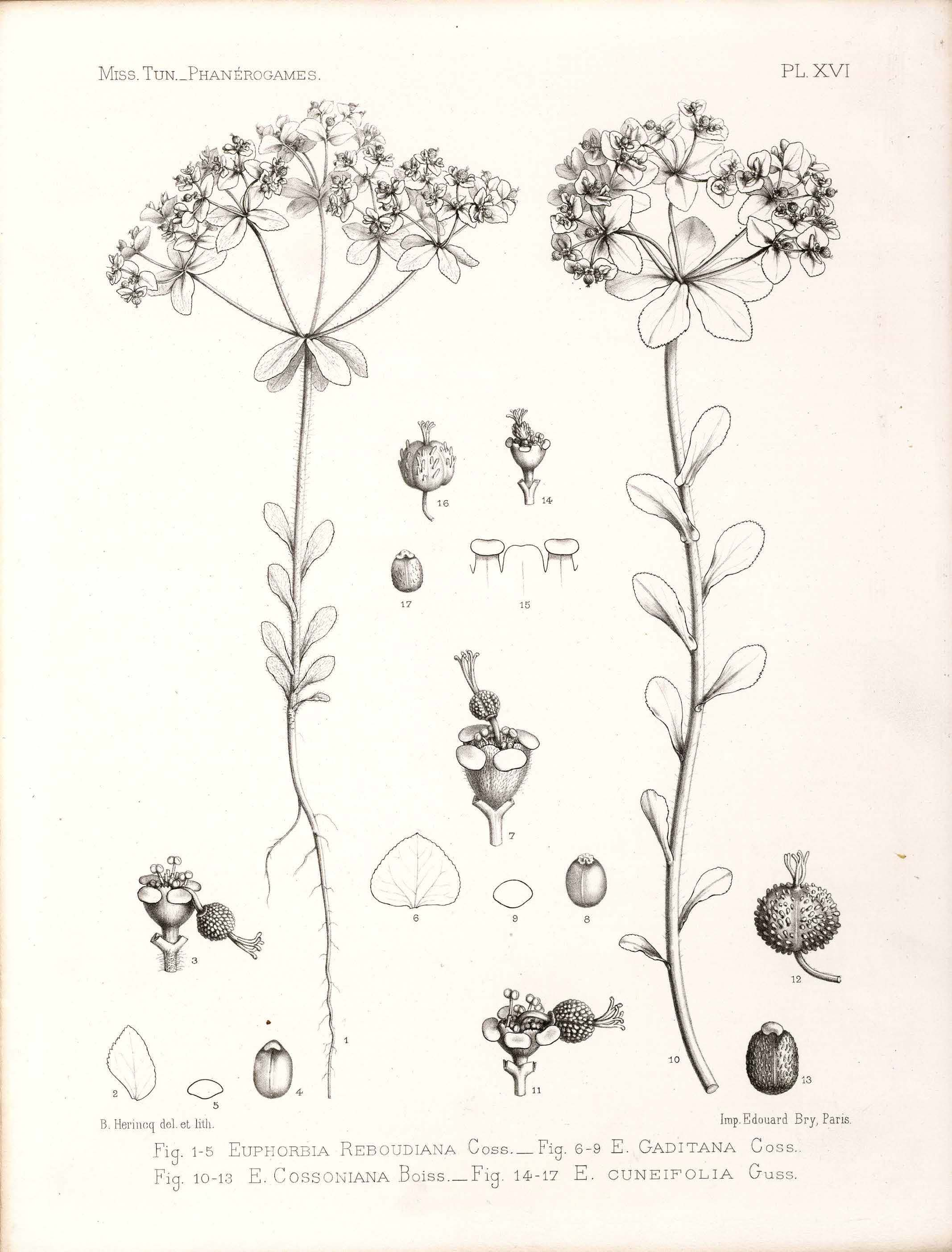

Scientific classification
- Kingdom: Plantae
- Clade: Tracheophytes
- Clade: Angiosperms
- Clade: Eudicots
- Clade: Rosids
- Order: Malpighiales
- Family: Euphorbiaceae
- Genus: Euphorbia
- Species: E. gaditana

Binomial name
- Euphorbia gaditana Coss.

= Euphorbia gaditana =

Species of plant

Euphorbia gaditana is a species of plant native to Spain and Northern Africa. It is an annual plant and reproduces by allogamy.

The species has also been classified as endangered. In Spain, this is due to pesticide application and agriculture.
