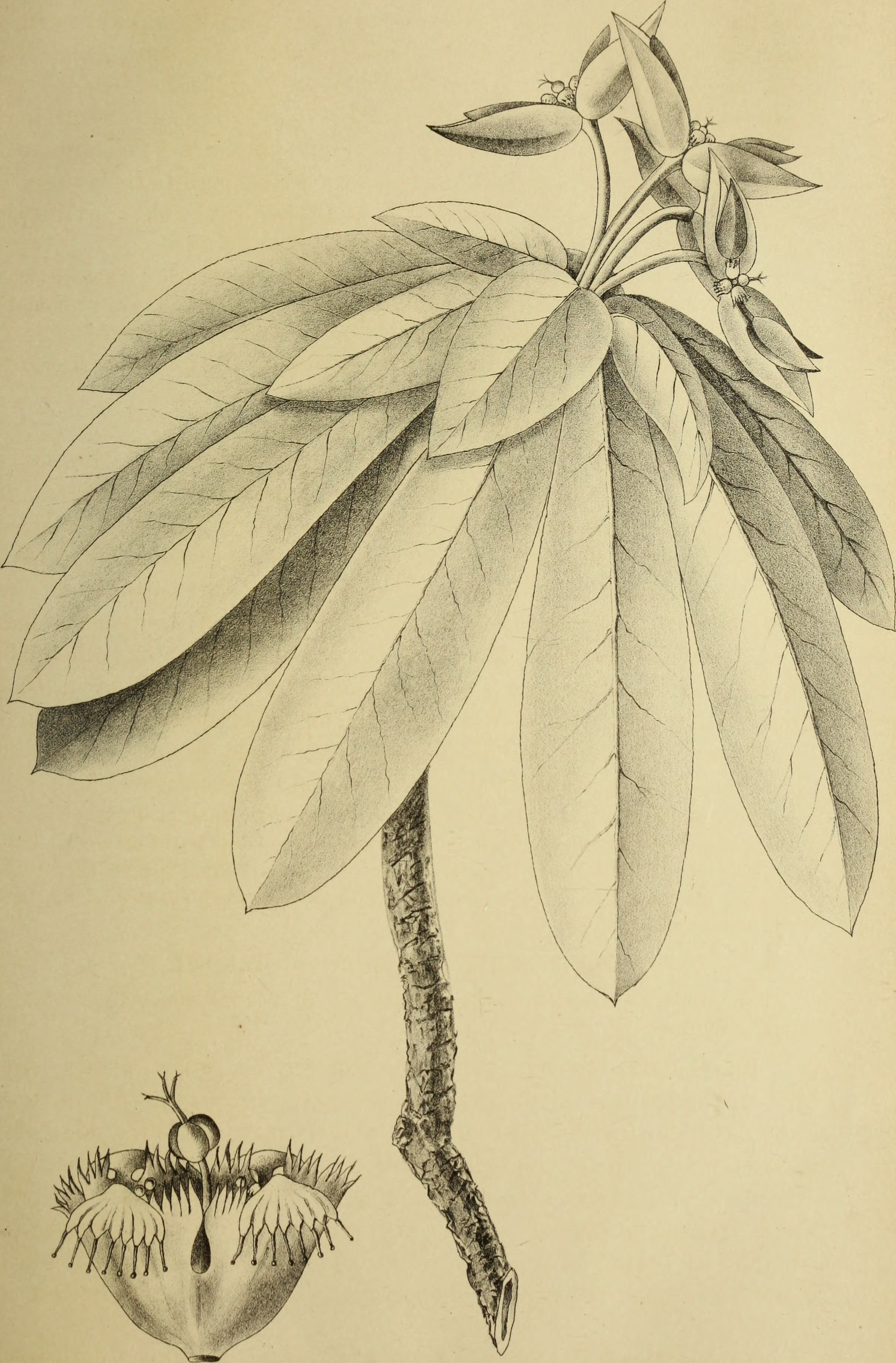
- Botanical drawing, 1894

Conservation status
- Vulnerable (IUCN 2.3)

Scientific classification
- Kingdom: Plantae
- Clade: Tracheophytes
- Clade: Angiosperms
- Clade: Eudicots
- Clade: Rosids
- Order: Malpighiales
- Family: Euphorbiaceae
- Genus: Euphorbia
- Species: E. noxia

Binomial name
- Euphorbia noxia Pax

= Euphorbia noxia =

Species of flowering plant

Euphorbia noxia is a species of plant in the family Euphorbiaceae. It is endemic to Somalia, and is threatened by habitat loss.
