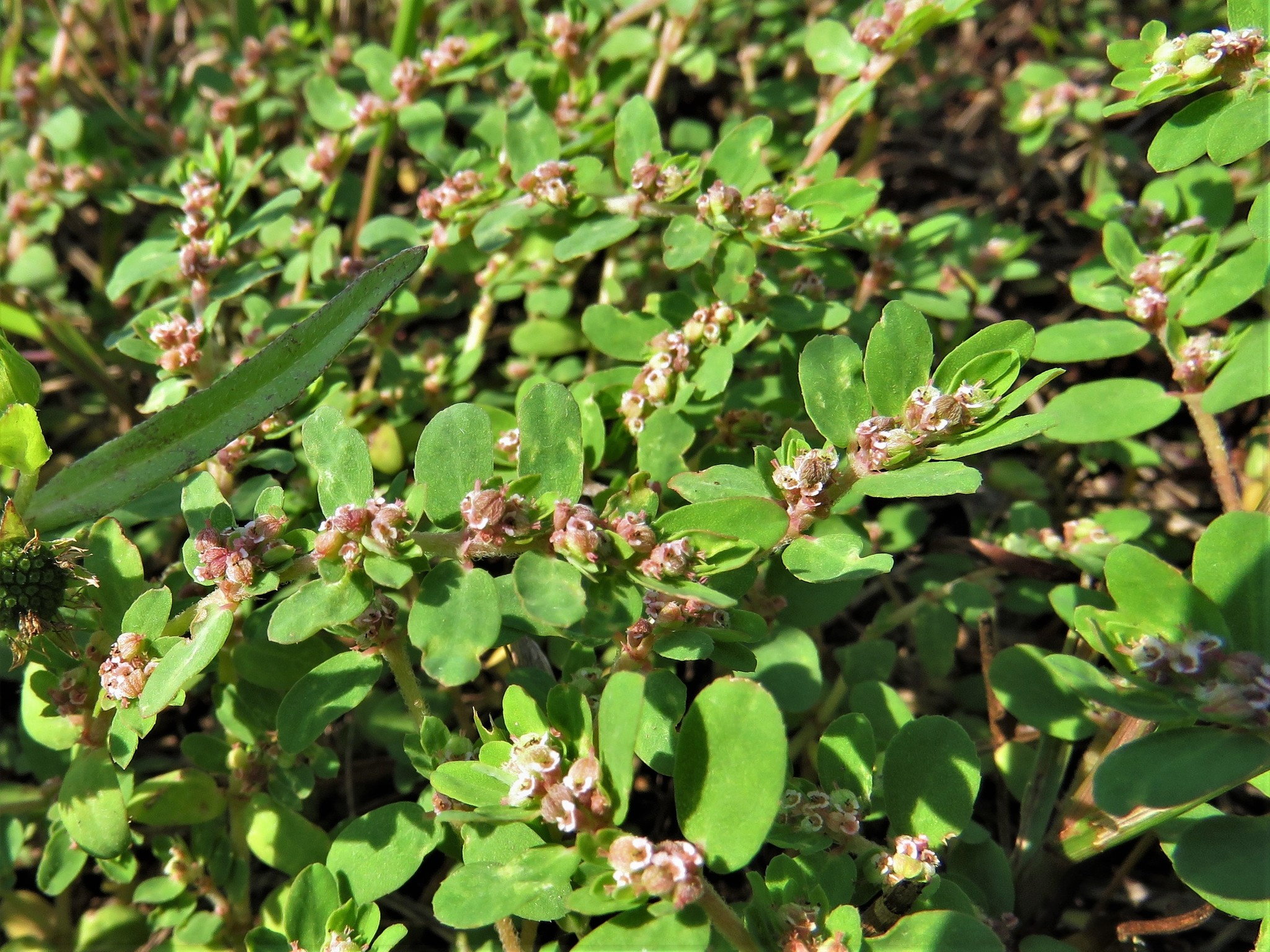

Scientific classification
- Kingdom: Plantae
- Clade: Tracheophytes
- Clade: Angiosperms
- Clade: Eudicots
- Clade: Rosids
- Order: Malpighiales
- Family: Euphorbiaceae
- Genus: Euphorbia
- Species: E. humistrata

Binomial name
- Euphorbia humistrata Engelm. ex A.Gray (1856)

Synonyms
- Anisophyllum humistratum (Engelm. ex A.Gray) Klotzsch & Garcke (1860); Chamaesyce humistrata (Engelm. ex A.Gray) Small (1903)

= Euphorbia humistrata =

Spreading sandmat

Species of plant

Euphorbia humistrata, known by the common names of spreading sandmat or spreading broomspurge, is a member of the spurge family, Euphorbiaceae. It is an annual herb, native to the southern and midwestern United States.
