= Euphorbia nigrispinoides =

Conservation status
- Near Threatened (IUCN 2.3)

Scientific classification
- Kingdom: Plantae
- Clade: Tracheophytes
- Clade: Angiosperms
- Clade: Eudicots
- Clade: Rosids
- Order: Malpighiales
- Family: Euphorbiaceae
- Genus: Euphorbia
- Species: E. nigrispinoides

Binomial name
- Euphorbia nigrispinoides M.Gilbert

Species of flowering plant

Euphorbia nigrispinoides is a species of plant in the family Euphorbiaceae. It is endemic to Ethiopia.
