= Peter René Oscar Bally =

Swiss botanist (1895–1980)

- Born: May 9, 1895; Schönenwerd, Switzerland
- Died: July 26, 1980 (aged 85); Nairobi
- Other names: P.R.O.Bally
- Occupations: botanical illustrator, botanist and taxonomist

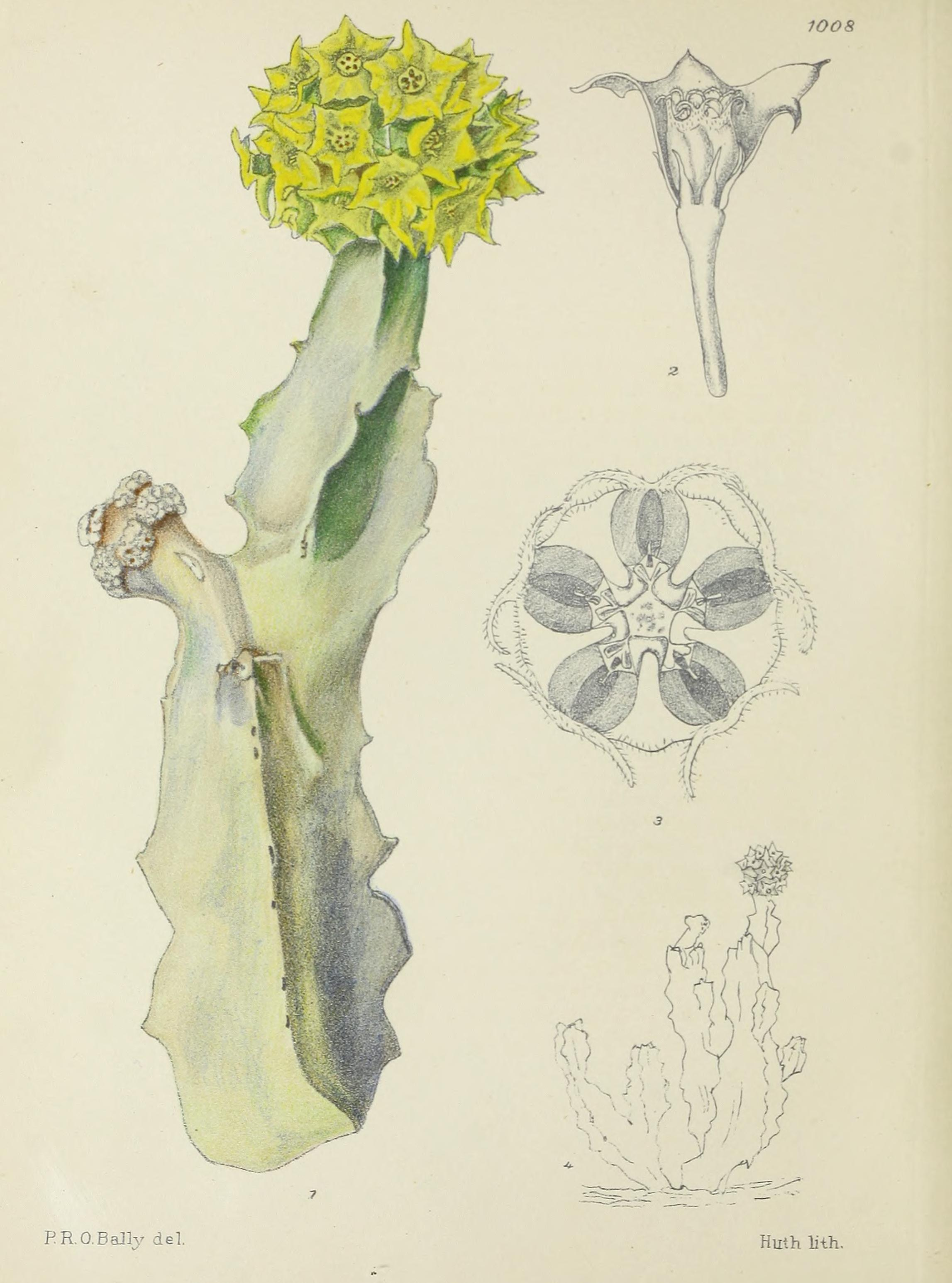
Caralluma somalica N.E.Br.

Peter René Oscar Bally (9 May 1895, in Schönenwerd, Switzerland – 26 July 1980, in Nairobi) was a Swiss botanical illustrator, botanist and taxonomist. The standard author abbreviation P.R.O.Bally is used to indicate this person as the author when citing a botanical name.

== Biography ==
Peter Bally received formal training in neither taxonomy nor botanical illustration, but studied chemistry at first, a position with the League of Nations taking him to Albania and Bombay in 1923/24 in order to test a possible antidote for malaria.

By 1930 he was working in Tanzania for an oil company, and studying medicinal and poisonous plants of the region. His botanical interests led to a study of plants, with an emphasis on succulents, in the semi-desert areas of eastern Africa.

By 1938 he had been appointed government botanist at the herbarium of the Coryndon Museum in Nairobi. He bought a small piece of land on the outskirts of the town and busied himself with constructing a house and establishing a garden of indigenous plants.

By 1943 he undertook botanising expeditions to Eritrea, Ethiopia, Somalia Ghana, Kenya, Sudan, Tanzania, Uganda and Zimbabwe.

In 1960 he relocated to Swaziland and worked on the genus Aloe accompanied at one time by Gilbert Reynolds, the Aloe specialist.

In 1957 he returned to Europe, working for some time on the Marnier-Lapostolle collection at the Jardin Botanique Lès Cedres in Saint-Jean-Cap-Ferrat, and then for some 12 years at the Conservatoire et Jardin Botanique in Geneva.

Returning to Kenya in 1969 Peter Bally indulged in his botanical interests, becoming a familiar visitor at the Coryndon Museum Herbarium renamed the East African Herbarium, and holding more than 700,000 plant specimens with field notes.

Species named for him include: Adenia ballyi, Aloe ballyi, Ceropegia ballyana, Euphorbia ballyana, Euphorbia ballyi, Euphorbia proballyana, Kalanchoe ballyi, Sansevieria ballyi and Echidnopsis ballyi, also Ballya zebrina (Chiov. ex Chiarugi) Brenan which later became a synonym of Aneilema zebrinum Chiov. ex Chiarugi. He described numerous species in the genera Aloe, Caralluma, Ceropegia, Echidnopsis, Euphorbia, Monadenium, Pseudolithos, Rhytidocaulon, Sansevieria, Senecio and Stapelia.

== Publications ==
- East African Succulentsv.1-6 'Journal of East African Natural History' (1940–46)
- The Genus 'Monadenium', a monographic study (1961)
