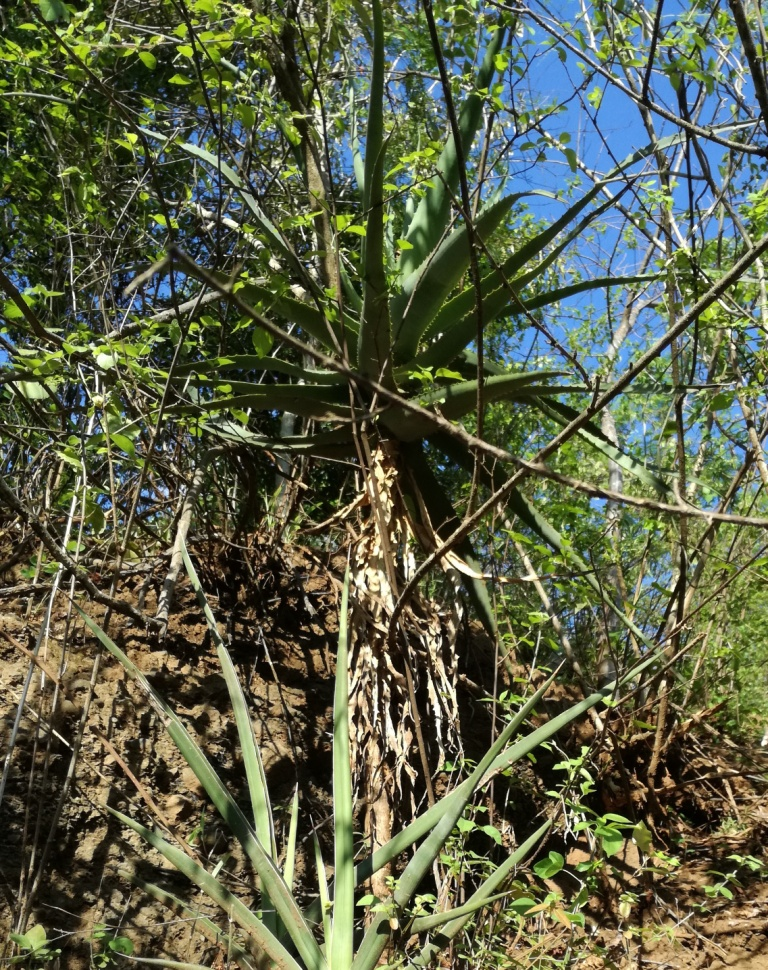

Conservation status
- Least Concern (IUCN 3.1)
- CITES Appendix II (CITES)

Scientific classification
- Kingdom: Plantae
- Clade: Tracheophytes
- Clade: Angiosperms
- Clade: Monocots
- Order: Asparagales
- Family: Asphodelaceae
- Subfamily: Asphodeloideae
- Genus: Aloe
- Species: A. volkensii

Binomial name
- Aloe volkensii Engl.

= Aloe volkensii =

Species of succulent

Aloe volkensii is a species of plant widely distributed in East Africa.

== Description ==
Aloe volkensii forms a tall, stiffly-erect stem, up to 4 meters tall. It occasionally develops an offset or two from its base. The long (c.60 cm), slender, grey-green leaves are recurved. The leaves bear brown-tipped teeth on their margins. Dead leaves are persistent and remain on the stem just below the rosette (unlike those of the rare Aloe ballyi). The leaves of juvenile plants have occasional pale spots. Its orange-red flowers are 35mm long, and born on subcapitate racemes, on an erect inflorescence with up to ten branches from lower on the inflorescence.

== Distribution ==
This species occurs from southern Kenya, across almost all of Tanzania, (Note: Note: Tanzania Aloe endemics: A. babatiensis, boscawenii, brachystachys, brandhamii, bukobana, bullockii, bussei, congdonii, dorotheae, flexilifolia, leachii, leedalii, leptosiphon, massawana, pembana, richardsiae. Tanzania Aloe indigenous: A. parvidens; lateritia; secundiflora; rabaiensis; volkensii; wollastonii; macrosiphon; ballyi, confusa, deserti, elata, fibrosa, morijensis, ngongensis; bicomitum, fimbrialis, veseyi; duckeri; mzimbana; bulbicaulis, nuttii; christianii; mawii; chabaudii; myriacantha) and as far west as Rwanda and Uganda. It grows in dry bushveld, usually on rocky slopes.
