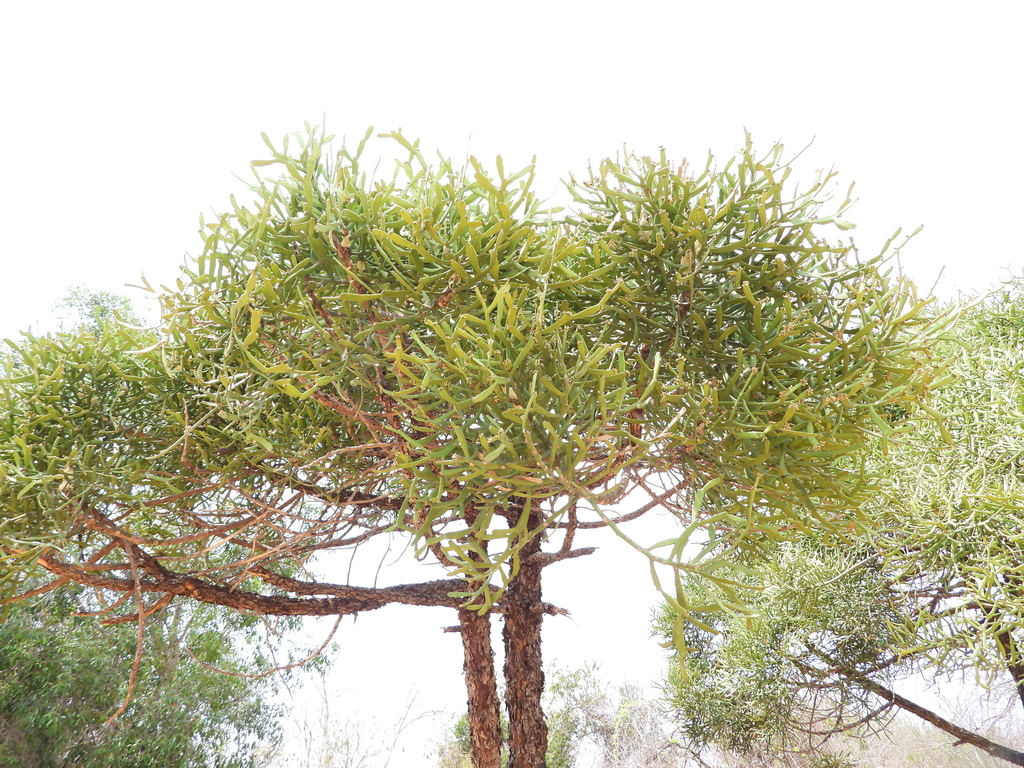
- In Zombitse-Vohibasia National Park

Conservation status
- Vulnerable (IUCN 3.1)

Scientific classification
- Kingdom: Plantae
- Clade: Embryophytes
- Clade: Tracheophytes
- Clade: Spermatophytes
- Clade: Angiosperms
- Clade: Eudicots
- Clade: Rosids
- Order: Malpighiales
- Family: Euphorbiaceae
- Genus: Euphorbia
- Species: E. xylophylloides

Binomial name
- Euphorbia xylophylloides Brongn. ex Lem.

Synonyms
- Euphorbia enterophora; Tirucalia enterophora; Tirucalia xylophylloides

= Euphorbia xylophylloides =

Plant species in the spurge family

Euphorbia xylophylloides is a spurge species from Madagascar that can grow into a tree. Its numbers in the wild are decreasing.

== Description ==
Euphorbia xylophylloides is a tree growing to as much as 20 metres (66 ft) in height with many branches and a wide crown. The overall form of a full grown tree is like a stone pine, umbrella shaped, and is the largest of the spurges that resemble corals. Young branches are green and flattened with a width of as much as 2 centimetres (0.79 in). The true leaves are deciduous, small, just 6.5 millimeters long and 4 mm wide, and found only at the branch tips.

== Taxonomy ==
In 1857 Charles Antoine Lemaire scientifically described a new species that he credited to Adolphe-Théodore Brongniart and named Euphorbia xylophylloides. It is classified in the Euphorbia genus within the Euphorbiaceae family. The species has three synonyms according to Plants of the World Online. The species Euphorbia enterophora was an accepted species until 1954 when Hermann Johannes Heinrich Jacobsen recognized that its similarity to E. xylophylloides. The similar species Euphorbia crassa is sometimes described as a subspecies, but is listed as accepted by Plants of the World Online.

Table of Synonyms
Name	Year	Rank	Notes
Euphorbia enterophora Drake	1899	species	= het.
Tirucalia enterophora (Drake) P.V.Heath	1996	species	= het.
Tirucalia xylophylloides (Brongn. ex Lem.) P.V.Heath	1996	species	≡ hom.
Notes: ≡ homotypic synonym; = heterotypic synonym

== Range and habitat ==
Euphorbia xylophylloides is endemic to the island nation of Madagascar. There it is found in the central and southern parts of the island in Antananarivo, Fianarantsoa, Toliara provinces. It grows on inselbergs, areas of isolated rock outcrops, and on sandy soils.

=== Conservation ===
When evaluated by the IUCN in 2020, Euphorbia xylophylloides was rated as vulnerable. However, at that time they also separately evaluated the synonym Euphorbia enterophora and rated it as least-concern. Both evaluations found the species to be declining in numbers due to habitat loss from mining, the harvest or destruction of plants by subsistence agriculture, and the collection of plants for horticulture.
