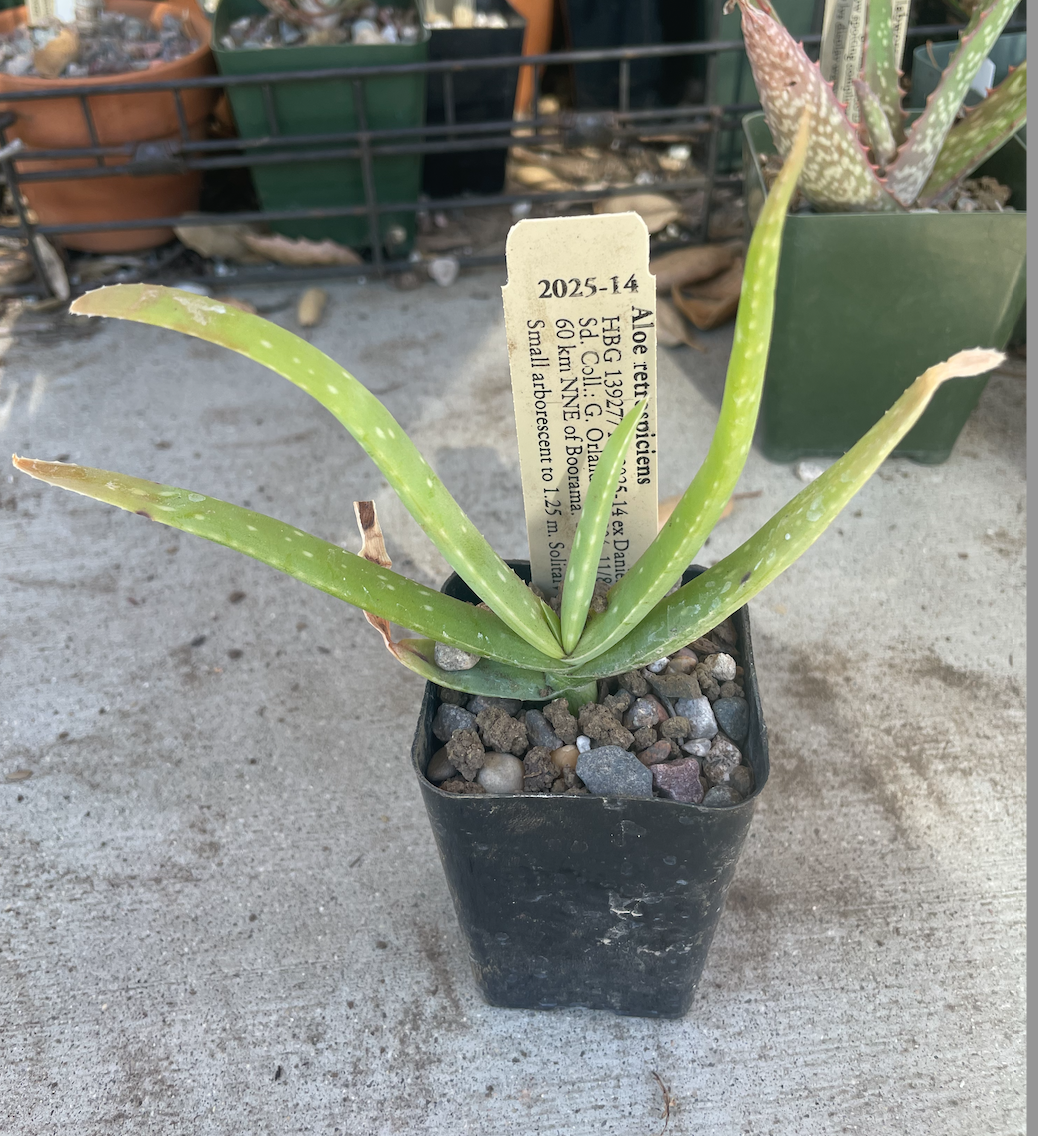

Conservation status
- Vulnerable (IUCN 3.1)
- CITES Appendix II (CITES)

Scientific classification
- Kingdom: Plantae
- Clade: Tracheophytes
- Clade: Angiosperms
- Clade: Monocots
- Order: Asparagales
- Family: Asphodelaceae
- Subfamily: Asphodeloideae
- Genus: Aloe
- Species: A. retrospiciens

Binomial name
- Aloe retrospiciens Reynolds & P.R.O.Bally

Synonyms
- Aloe ruspoliana var. dracaeniformis A.Berger

= Aloe retrospiciens =

Species of plant

Aloe retrospiciens is a species of aloe native to Somalia and East Ethiopia first described in 1958.

== Description of species ==
This is a soliary, sometimes branching from the bottom aloe. Plants are arborescent, and will have leaves of a large size. Plants get about 4 feet tall.

== Flower description ==
Flowers are in clumps, and orange and tubular like many aloe flowers.
