= Julien Marnier-Lapostolle =

Julien Marnier-Lapostolle (1902 - 1976) was a French botanical explorer.

Marnier-Lapostolle's paternal and maternal families were both successful businesspeople in the French wine industry. The Marniers founded a winery in the Santerre region in the 18th century. The Lapostolle family operated a small but famous distillery, founded in 1827 by his grandfather Jean-Baptiste Lapostolle, in Neauphle-le-Chateau near Paris.

Marnier-Lapostolle created the "Jardin Botanique des Cedres" in Cap Ferrat, France.

Marnier-Lapostolle was president of the "Association Francaise des Amateurs de Cactees".

== Honors ==
=== Eponyms ===
- Kalanchoe marnieriana
- (Bromeliaceae) Dyckia marnier-lapostollei L.B.Sm. 1966
- (Bromeliaceae) Hechtia marnier-lapostollei L.B.Sm. 1961
- (Bromeliaceae) Tillandsia marnieri-lapostollei Rauh 1973
- (Bromeliaceae) Werauhia marnier-lapostollei (L.B.Sm.) J.R.Grant 1995
