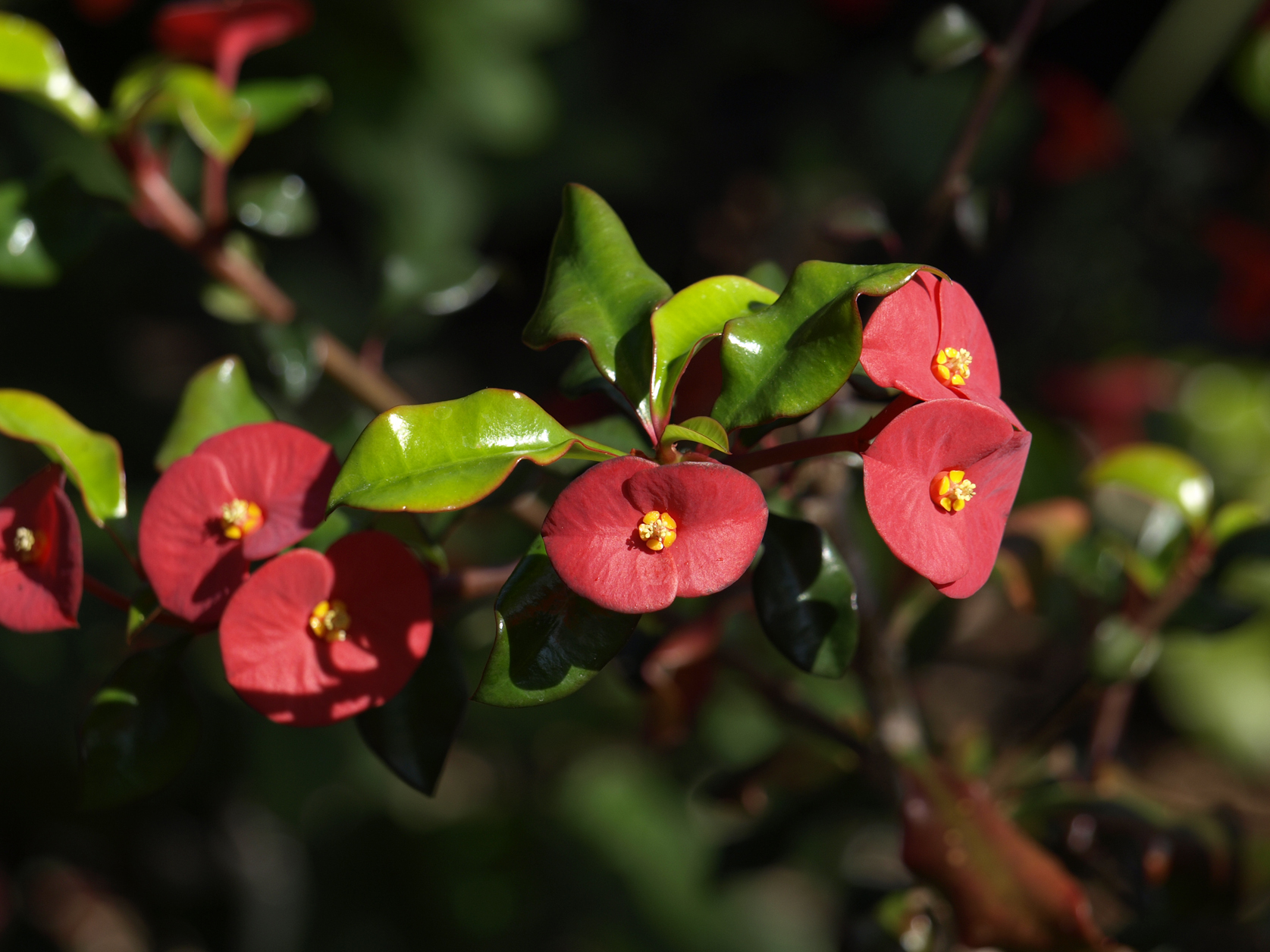

Conservation status
- Critically Endangered (IUCN 3.1)

Scientific classification
- Kingdom: Plantae
- Clade: Tracheophytes
- Clade: Angiosperms
- Clade: Eudicots
- Clade: Rosids
- Order: Malpighiales
- Family: Euphorbiaceae
- Genus: Euphorbia
- Species: E. geroldii

Binomial name
- Euphorbia geroldii Rauh

= Euphorbia geroldii =

Species of flowering plant

Euphorbia geroldii commonly called Gerold's Spurge or Thornless Crown of Thorns is a species of flowering plant in the family Euphorbiaceae.

== Description ==
It is a succulent that grows as a richly branched, xerophytic shrub up to 2 m (6.6 ft) tall, with cylindrical, woody branches that reach a diameter of 2 cm (0.8 in) at the base. The smooth, glossy, lanceolate leaves are arranged in loose spirals on the shoots and grow up to 8 cm (3.1 in) long and 3 cm (1.2 in) wide. They are glossy dark green with a red margin and are nearly sessile. The stipules, 1 to 2 mm (0.04 to 0.08 in) long, are toothed.

The plant resembles the Crown of Thorns (Euphorbia milii), but it has broader leaves, lacks thorns, and prefers shadier conditions.

=== Flowers ===
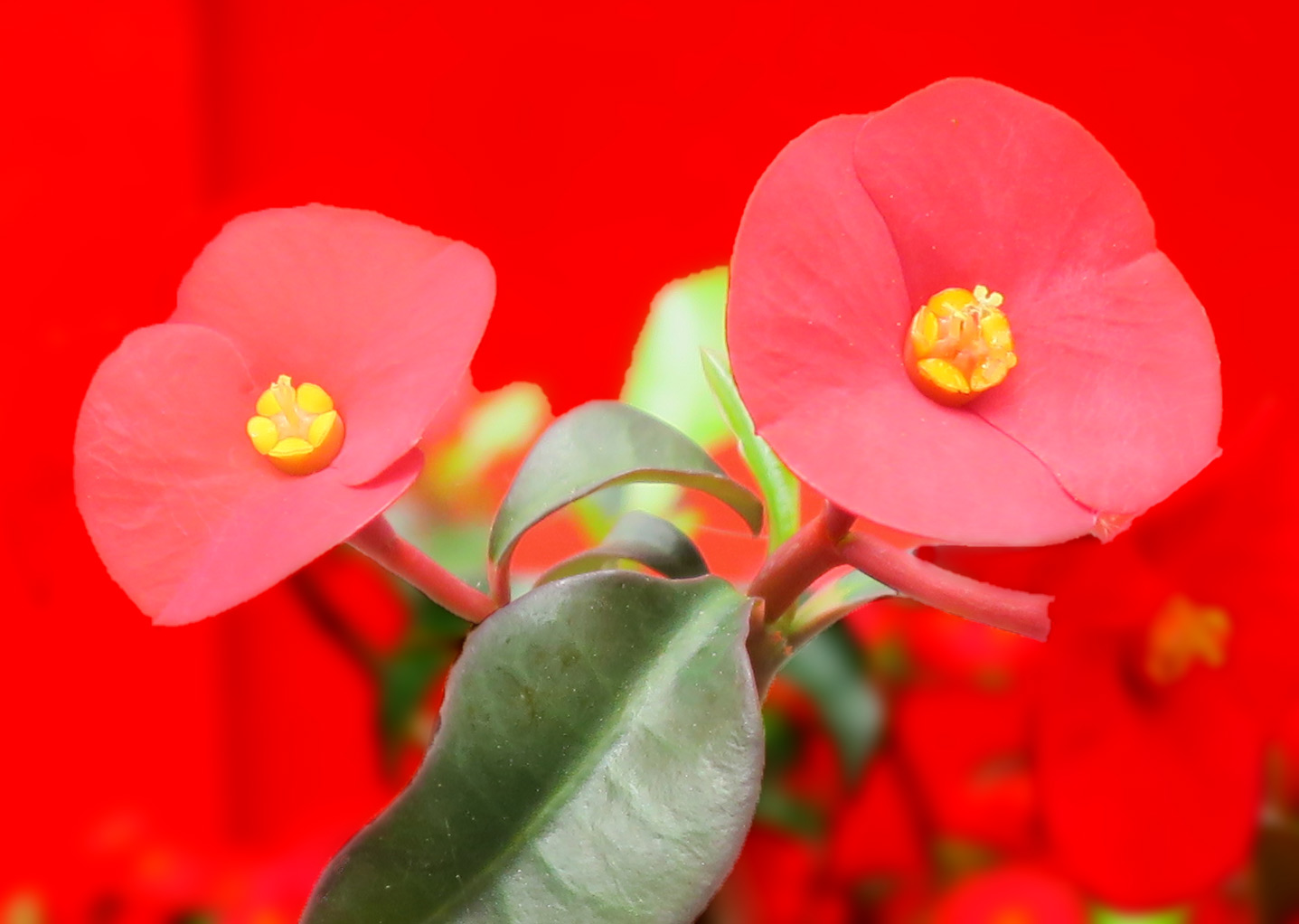

The nearly terminal and simple, saucer-shaped cymes are borne on 3 cm (1.2 in) long stalks. The spreading and rounded cyathophylls grow up to 2.5 cm (0.98 in) long and 2.8 cm (1.1 in) wide. They overlap at the base and are bright red. The cyathia are 2 mm (0.079 in) in size, and the elliptical nectar glands are yellow.

Male flowers are few, with fimbriate bracteoles. Filaments are short and thick; anthers globose and pale. The ovary is subsessile, with styles partly connate and spreading at the bifid, green apex; stigmas are globular. With suitable conditions, the plant delivers a continuous display of vivid, glowing red flowers year-round. The bluntly lobed fruit is 3 mm (0.12 in) long and yellowish.

== Distribution ==
It is endemic to northeastern Madagascar, found through the encompassing coastal forest of Iharana, in the Ambilobe region. Its natural habitat is subtropical or tropical dry forests and in the sands of coastal forests. The species is threatened by habitat degradation, fire, and clearing for charcoal production, as well as collection for both national and international horticultural trade. It is highly vulnerable to any form of disturbance, including human-induced fires. It is threatened by habitat loss. The species is on the IUCN Red List and is considered critically endangered.

== Cultivation ==
A relatively fast growing species, it is cultivated as an ornamental plant and is especially popular as a thornless houseplant. Grown from cuttings, its care requirements are similar to those of other shrubby Euphorbia species from tropical regions such as Madagascar and central Africa, though it is among the easiest to grow. Hummingbirds are particularly attracted to it. Outdoors, the plant prefers semi-shade; indoors, it requires full to partial sun. Plants grown in shade should be gradually acclimated before being moved into full sunlight, as sudden exposure can cause severe scorching. This species is especially tolerant of coastal conditions and salt spray, making it an excellent choice for seaside plantings. A tall plant will need staking, otherwise it will be leggy. Pests such as mildew can occur in very humid conditions.
