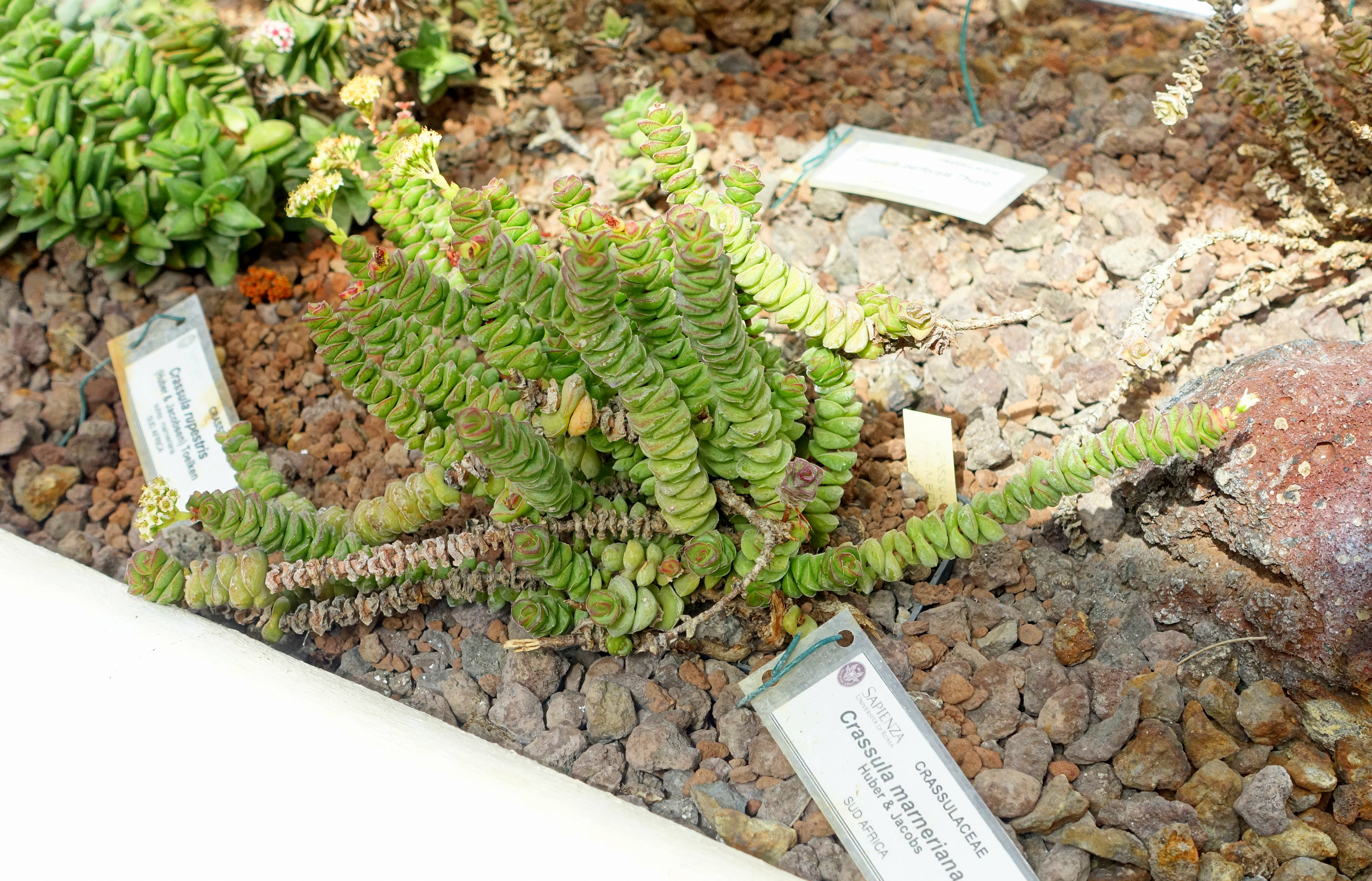
- Crassula marnierana at the botanical gardens Orto botanico Rome, Italy.

Scientific classification
- Kingdom: Plantae
- Clade: Embryophytes
- Clade: Tracheophytes
- Clade: Angiosperms
- Clade: Eudicots
- Order: Saxifragales
- Family: Crassulaceae
- Genus: Crassula
- Species: C. marnierana

Binomial name
- Crassula marnierana H.Huber & H.Jacobsen, 1952

Synonyms
- Crassula rupestris ssp. marnierana

= Crassula marnieriana =

Jade necklace

Species of succulent

Crassula marnierana, common name Jade Necklace or Chinese Pagoda, is a species of succulent flowering plant in the family Crassulaceae.

== Description ==
Crassula marnierana is a slow-growing small plant reaching a height of 15–20 cm (6–8 in). The thick rounded leaves are green with red edges. They are tightly stacked along the stem and store water, as they are covered with a cuticle to limit the evaporation. An inflorescence with small star-shaped pink-tinged flowers may appear on mature plants in winter if they are given proper conditions of temperature. This plant prefers direct light and as a houseplant is very easy to maintain.

== Distribution ==
This species is native to South Africa, Lesotho and Eswatini.

== Gallery ==
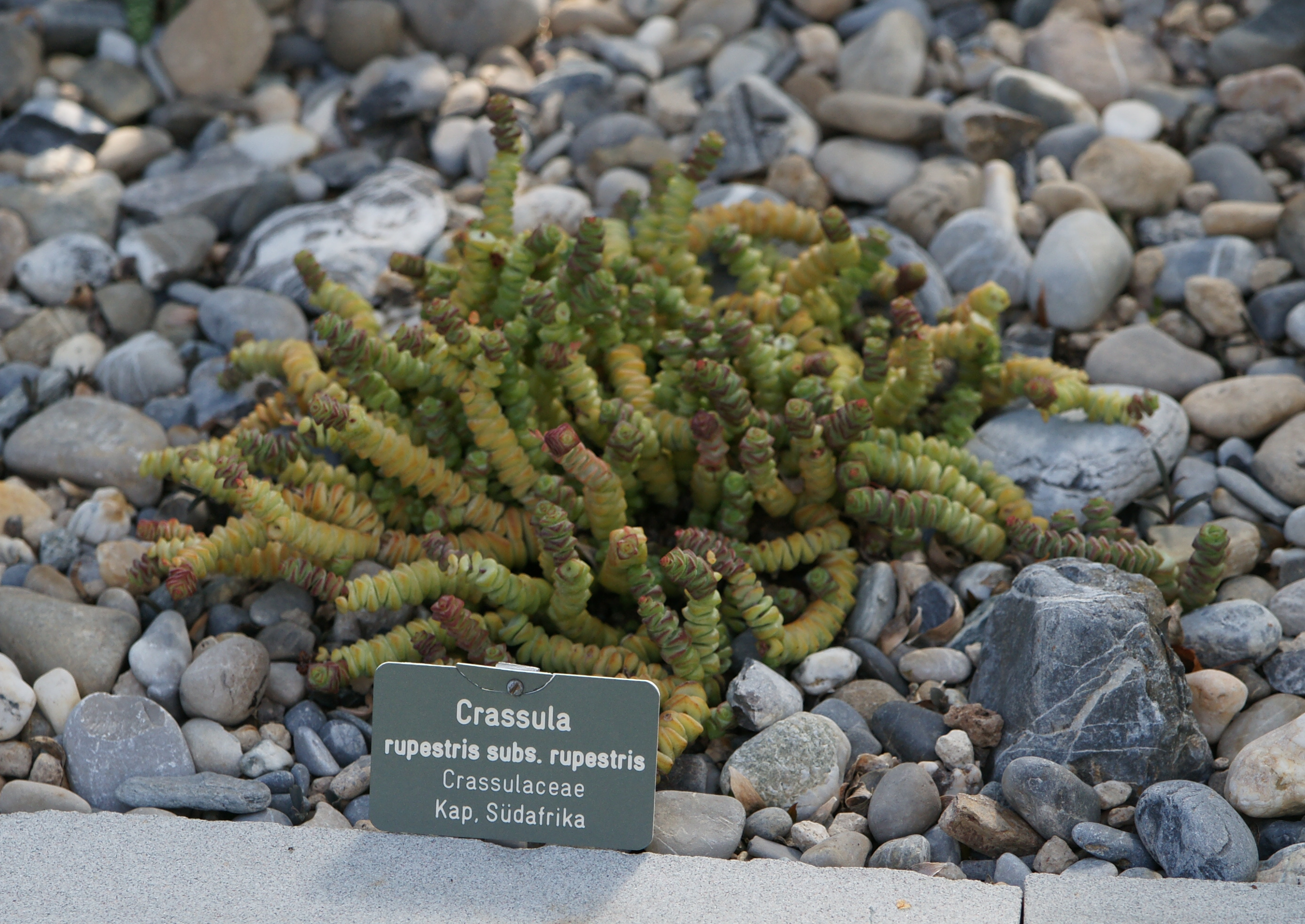
Crassula rupestris subs. rupestris. Schauhaus der Stadtgärtnerei Bern, Elfenau.

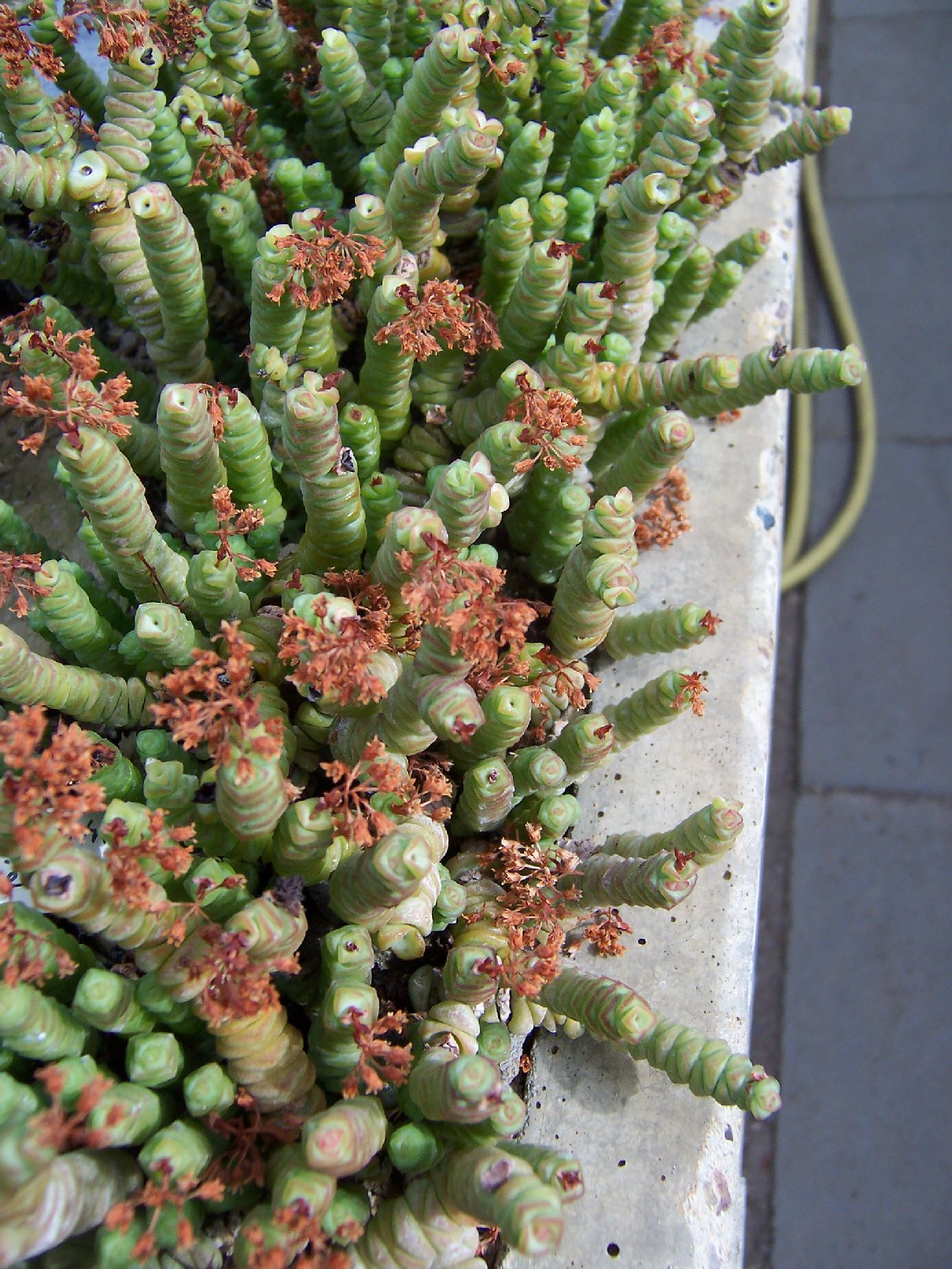
Crassula rupestris marnierana - Cologne University Botanical Collection

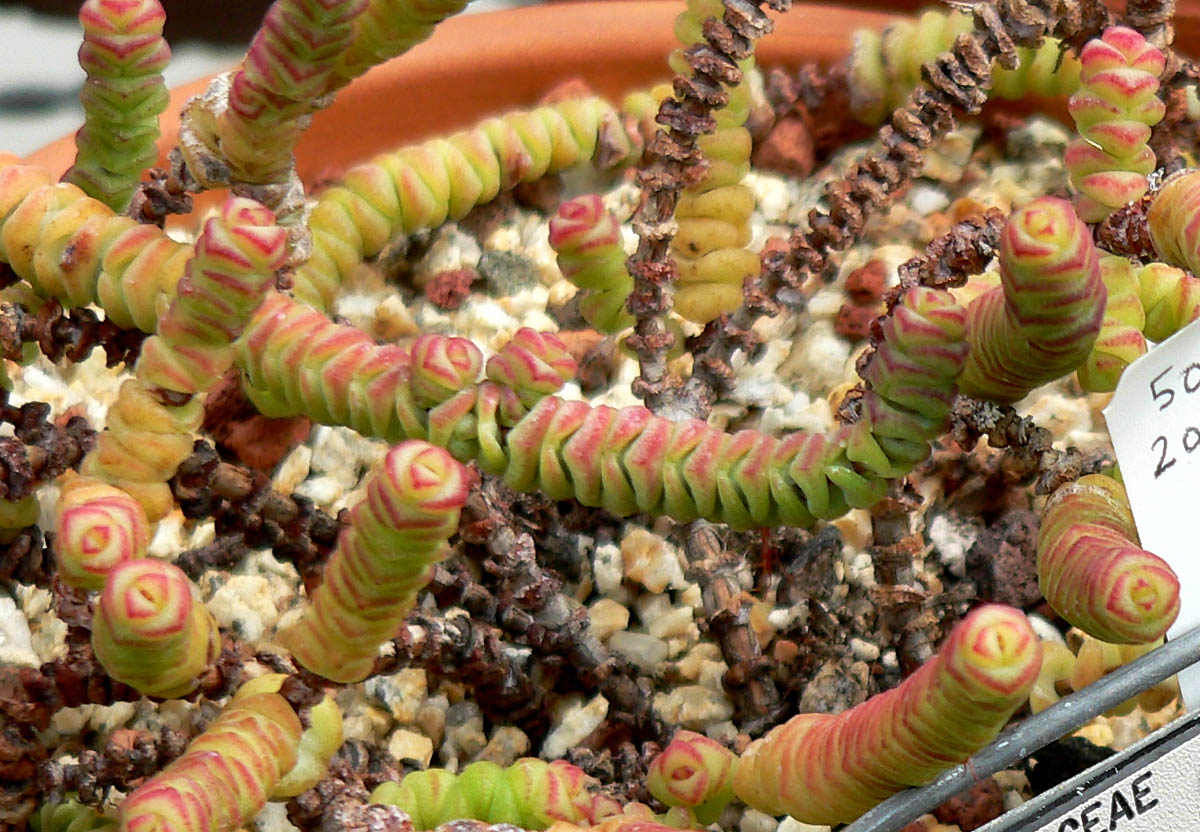
Crassula rupestris ssp. marnieriana - University of California Botanical Garden, Berkeley, California
