= Christ plant =

Christ plant is a common name for several plants and may refer to:

- Euphorbia milii (Euphorbiaceae), also referred to as crown-of-thorns
- Paliurus spina-christi (Rhamnaceae), also referred to as crown-of-thorns, Christ's thorn or Jerusalem thorn

This plant is very common in Jerusalem, and is also known as the Cristo Plant.
