= Tillandsia marnieri-lapostollei =

Conservation status
- Vulnerable (IUCN 3.1)

Scientific classification
- Kingdom: Plantae
- Clade: Tracheophytes
- Clade: Angiosperms
- Clade: Monocots
- Clade: Commelinids
- Order: Poales
- Family: Bromeliaceae
- Genus: Tillandsia
- Subgenus: Tillandsia subg. Tillandsia
- Species: T. marnieri-lapostollei

Binomial name
- Tillandsia marnieri-lapostollei Rauh

Species of plant

Tillandsia marnieri-lapostollei is a species of flowering plant in the family Bromeliaceae. It is endemic to Ecuador. Its natural habitat is subtropical or tropical dry forests. It is threatened by habitat loss.

== Taxonomy ==
Tillandsia marnieri-lapostollei was first described in 1972 by Werner Rauh. However, this description did not include the then-required Latin diagnosis and so was invalid. Rauh validated the name in 1973. The specific epithet marnieri-lapostollei honours Julien Marnier-Lapostolle, a bromeliad collector and owner of Jardin botanique "Les Cèdres".
