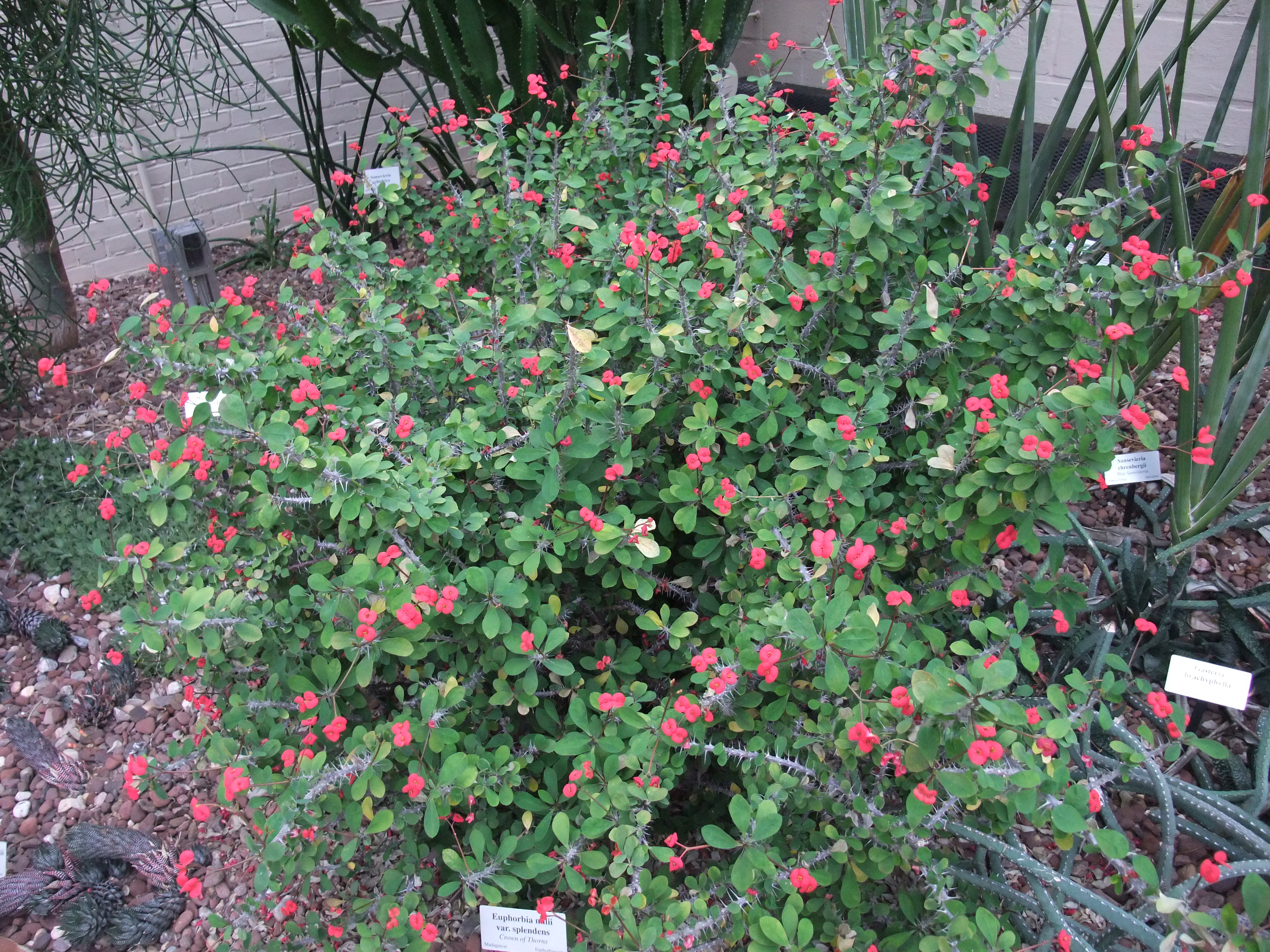

Scientific classification
- Kingdom: Plantae
- Clade: Tracheophytes
- Clade: Angiosperms
- Clade: Eudicots
- Clade: Rosids
- Order: Malpighiales
- Family: Euphorbiaceae
- Genus: Euphorbia
- Species: E. milii
- Variety: E. m. var. splendens

Trinomial name
- Euphorbia milii var. splendens (Bojer ex Hook.) Ursch & Leandri

Synonyms
- Euphorbia splendens Bojer ex Hook.

= Euphorbia milii var. splendens =

Variety of plants

Euphorbia milii var. splendens is a variety of the species Euphorbia milii. Like the other varieties of E. milii (and other plants in the spurge family Euphorbiaceae) E. m. var. splendens produces a milky latex that is an irritant poison. Under the name sijou (alternative spelling sijwu) the plant, known formerly as Euphorbia splendens, is considered to be sacred in the Bathouist religion of the Bodo people of Assam, West Bengal, Nagaland and Nepal, in which it symbolizes the supreme deity, Bathoubwrai (Master of the Five Elements). This cultivation of the sijou tree for ritual purposes was particularly strong among the Bodo people (known also as Mech) of the Goalpara region. The plant does not often set seed, but is easy to propagate vegetatively; branches broken from an established plant root readily as cuttings. Families that follow Bathouism plant a sijou shrub at the northeast corner of their courtyard in an altar referred to as the sijousali. Bodo communities that follow Bathouism generally plant a sijou shrub or small tree in a piece of communally-owned land, which they fence with eighteen pairs of bamboo strips with five fastenings. Each pair symbolizes a divine couple consisting of a minor God and Goddess. From bottom to top, the five fastenings (bando) signify birth, pain, death, marriage and peace/pleasure. The milestones on the path of life represented by the bottom three fastenings are those that one cannot escape; whereas those symbolized by the top two are not necessarily attained by all.
