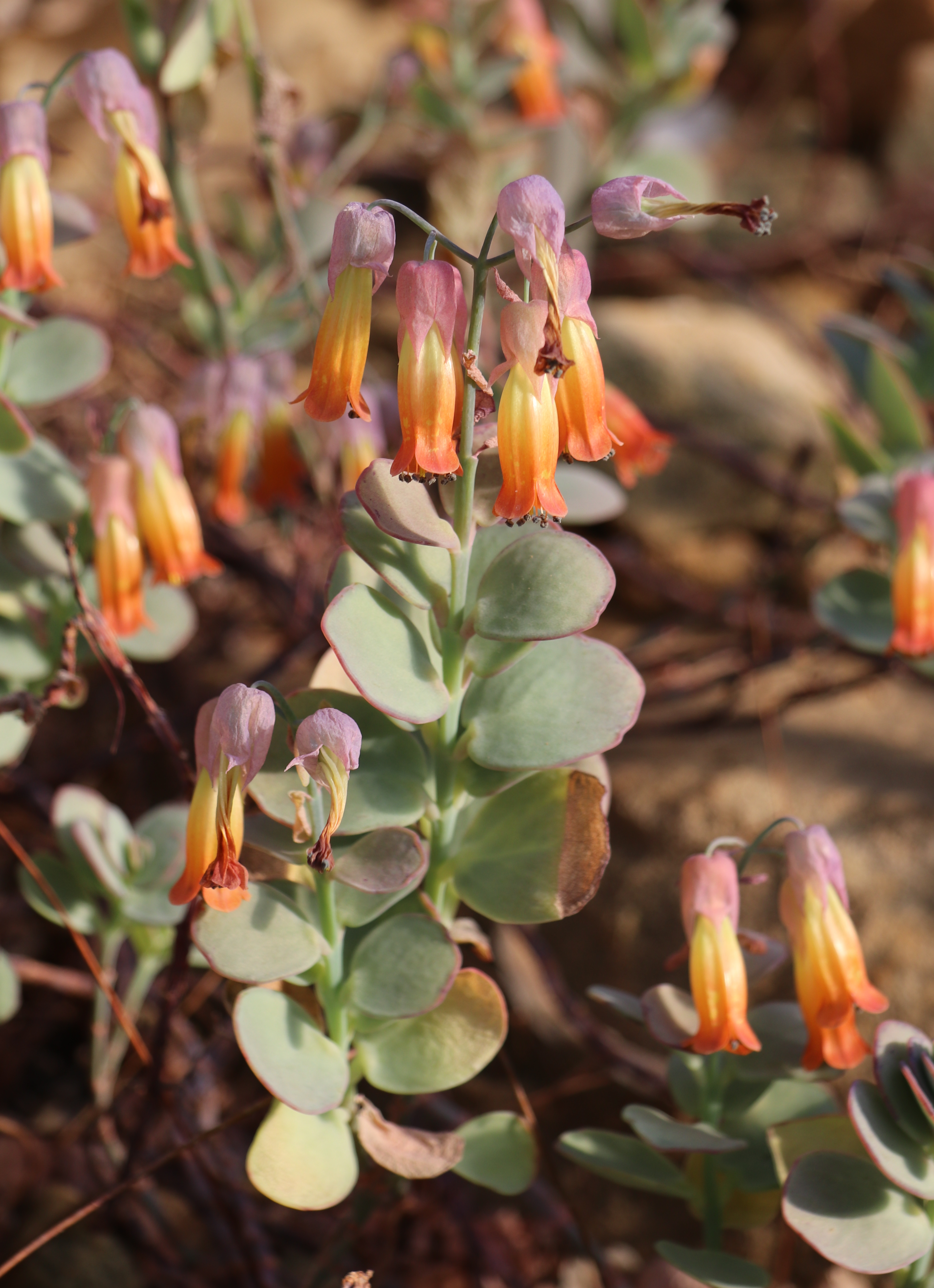
- In bloom

Scientific classification
- Kingdom: Plantae
- Clade: Tracheophytes
- Clade: Angiosperms
- Clade: Eudicots
- Order: Saxifragales
- Family: Crassulaceae
- Genus: Kalanchoe
- Species: K. marnieriana

Binomial name
- Kalanchoe marnieriana H.Jacobsen ex L.Allorge

Synonyms
- Bryophyllum marnierianum (H.Jacobsen ex L.Allorge) Govaerts; Kalanchoe humbertii Mannoni & Boiteau

= Kalanchoe marnieriana =

Species of plant

Kalanchoe marnieriana, also known as Marnier's kalanchoe, is a species of succulent plant in the family Crassulaceae.

== Description ==
Kalanchoe marnieriana is a glabrous perennial to 11.5 inches tall. The flowers are yellow, orange to pink tubes.

The species is closely related to Kalanchoe fedtschenkoi, sharing the same habit, biology and ecology.

Kalanchoe can be toxic to humans and animals.

== Distribution and habitat ==
Kalanchoe marnieriana grows in south-eastern Madagascar in moist, rocky places.

== Taxonomy ==
In 1954, Hermann Johannes Heinrich Jacobsen described Kalanchoe marnieriana, publishing his findings in Handbok i Skandinaviens Flora (ed. 11).

=== Etymology ===
Kalanchoe: Generic name derived from the Cantonese word "Kalan Chauhuy", meaning 'that which falls and grows'.

marnieriana: epithet given in honor of the French wine entrepreneur, Julien Marnier-Lapostolle.

== Gallery ==
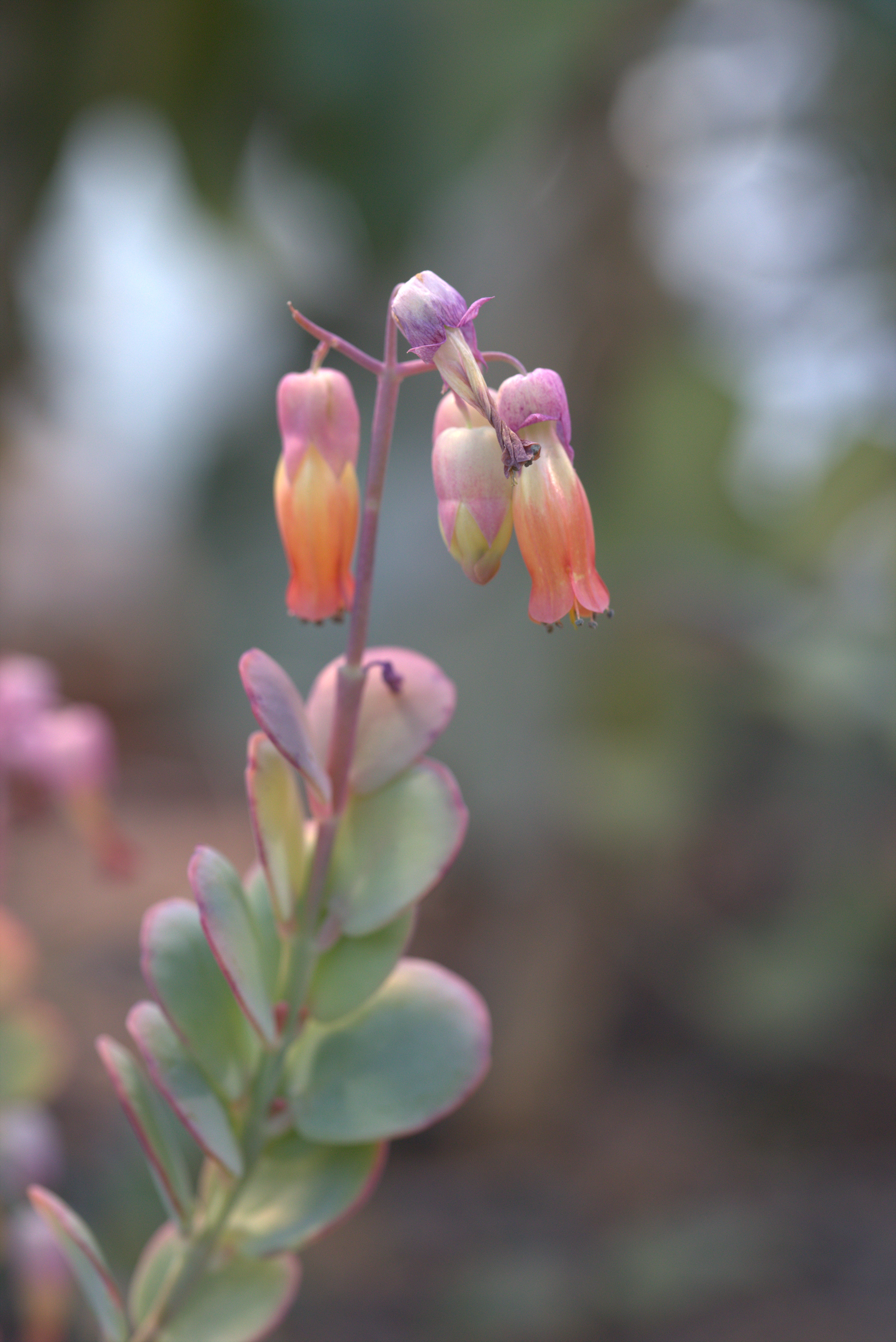

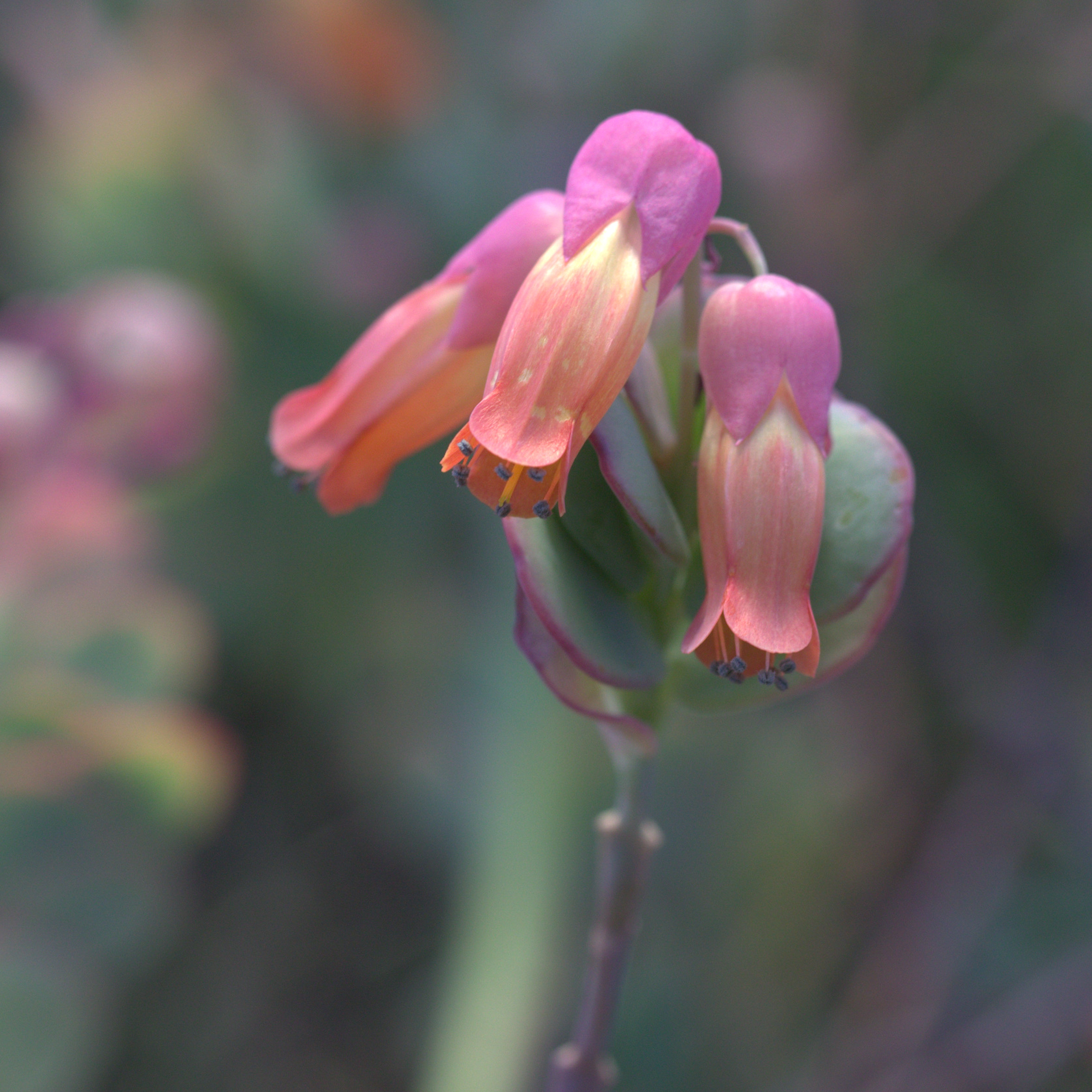

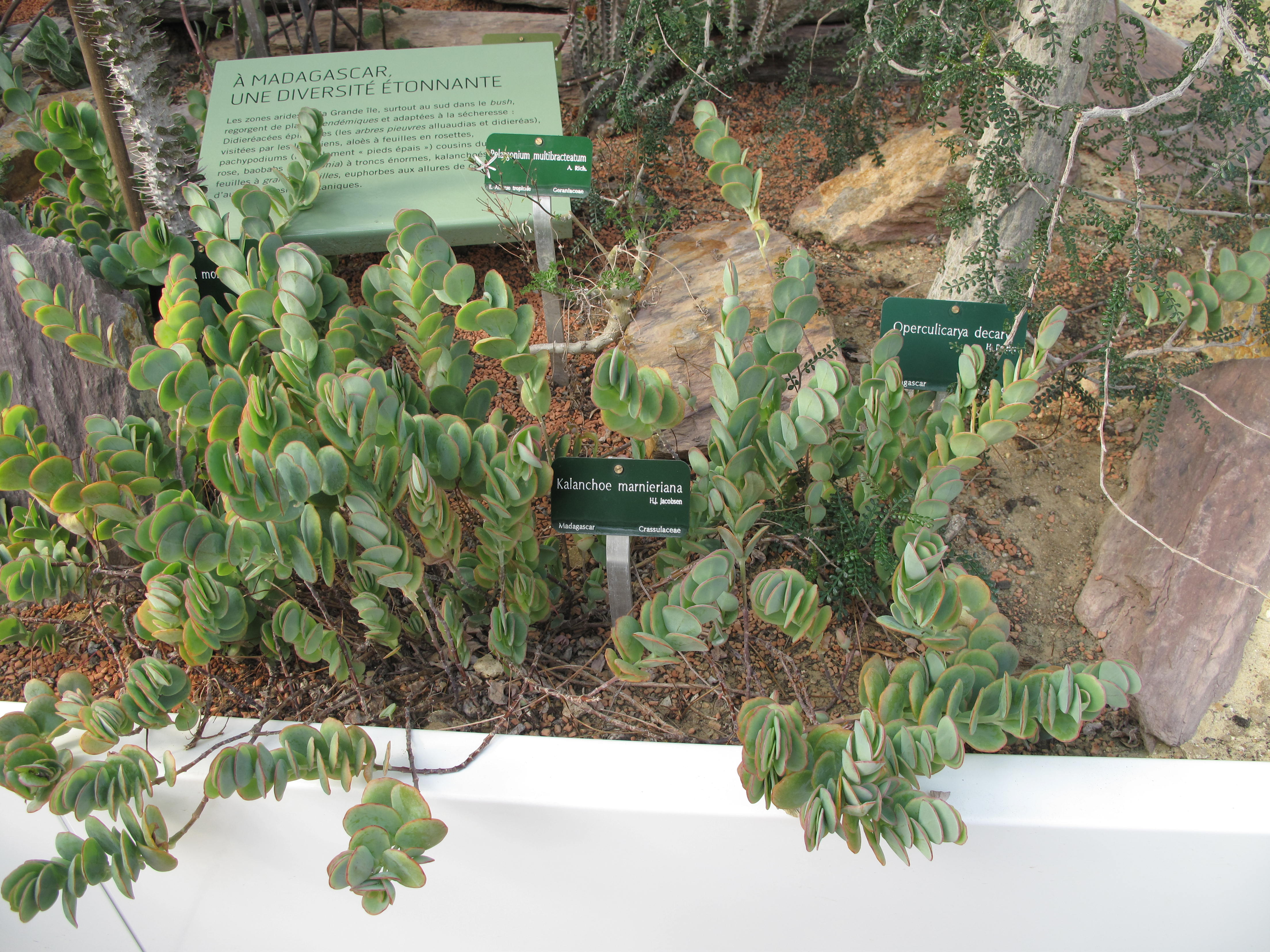

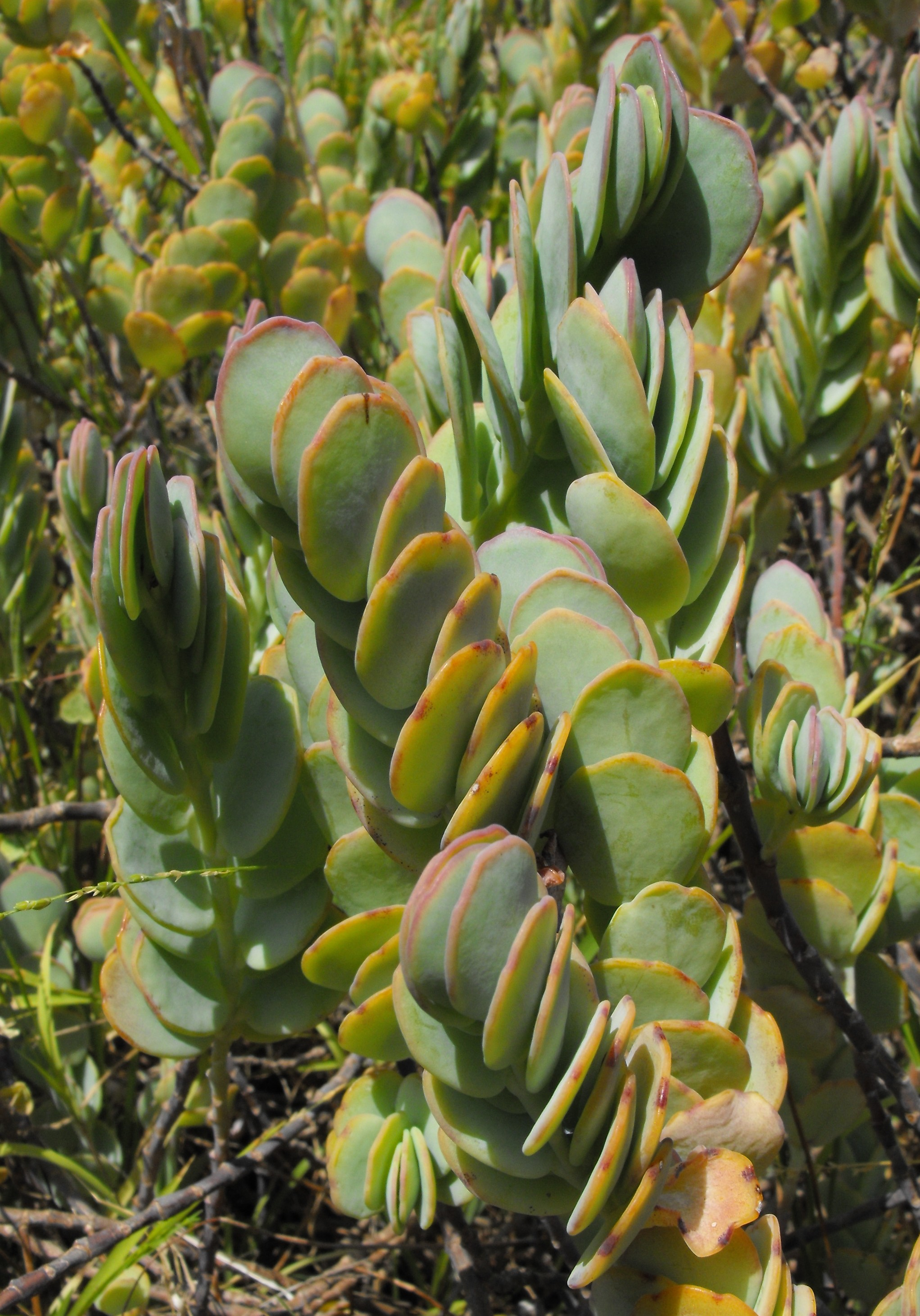

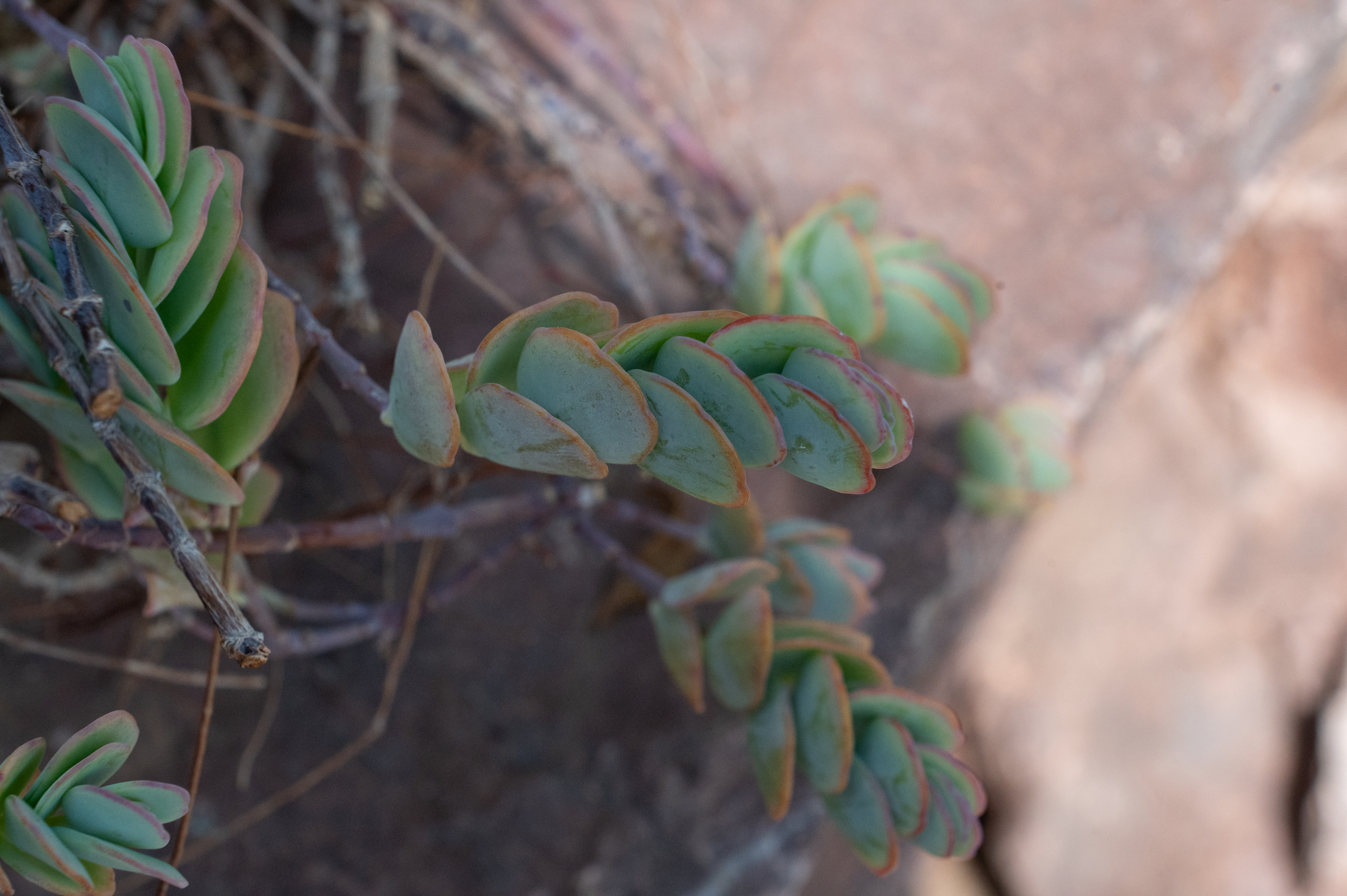

== See also ==
- Bernard Descoings (2003), "Kalanchoe marnieriana", in Urs Eggli (ed.), Sukkulenten-Lexikon. Crassulaceae (Dickblattgewächse), Stuttgart: Eugen Ulmer, p. 171, ISBN 3-8001-3998-7
