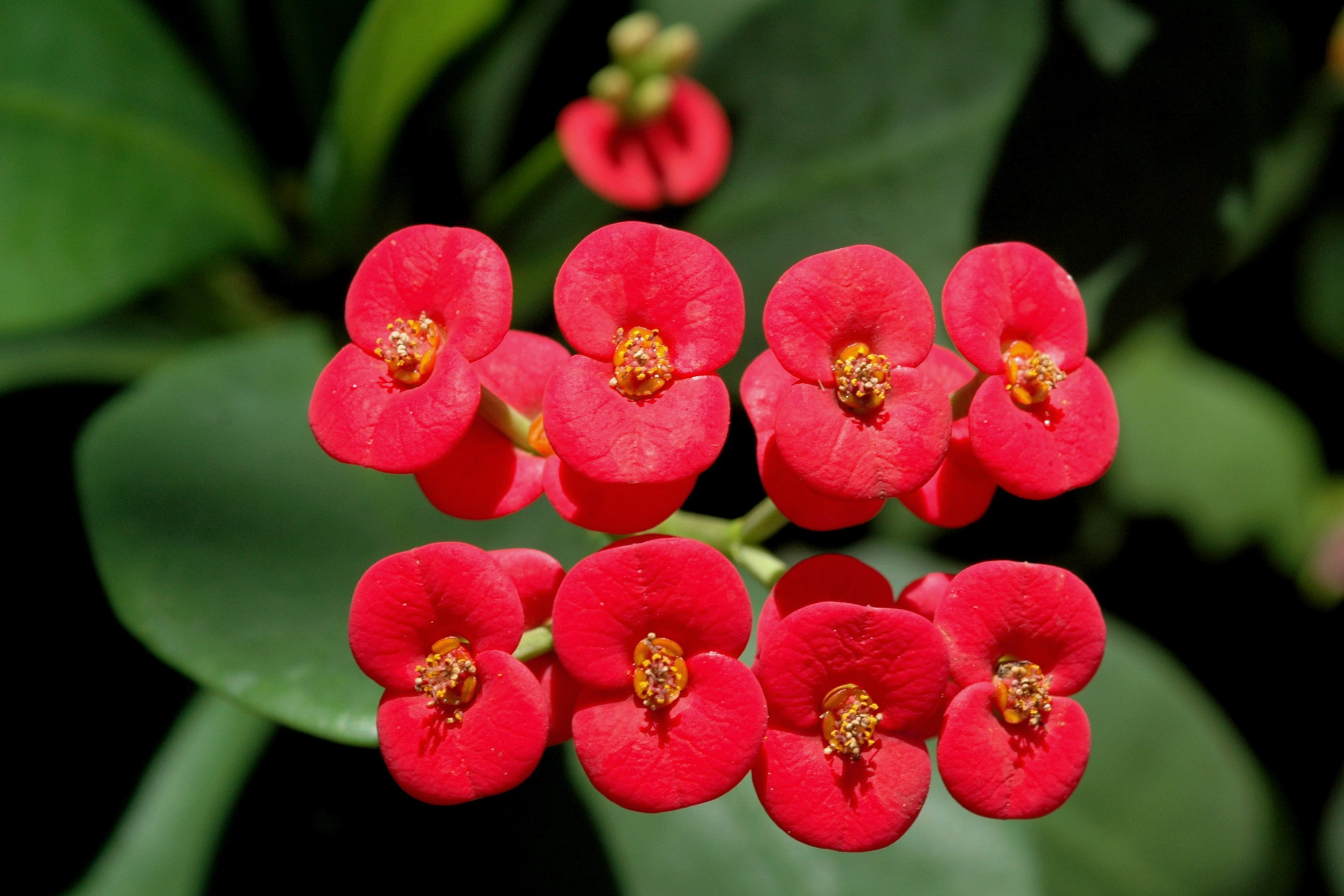

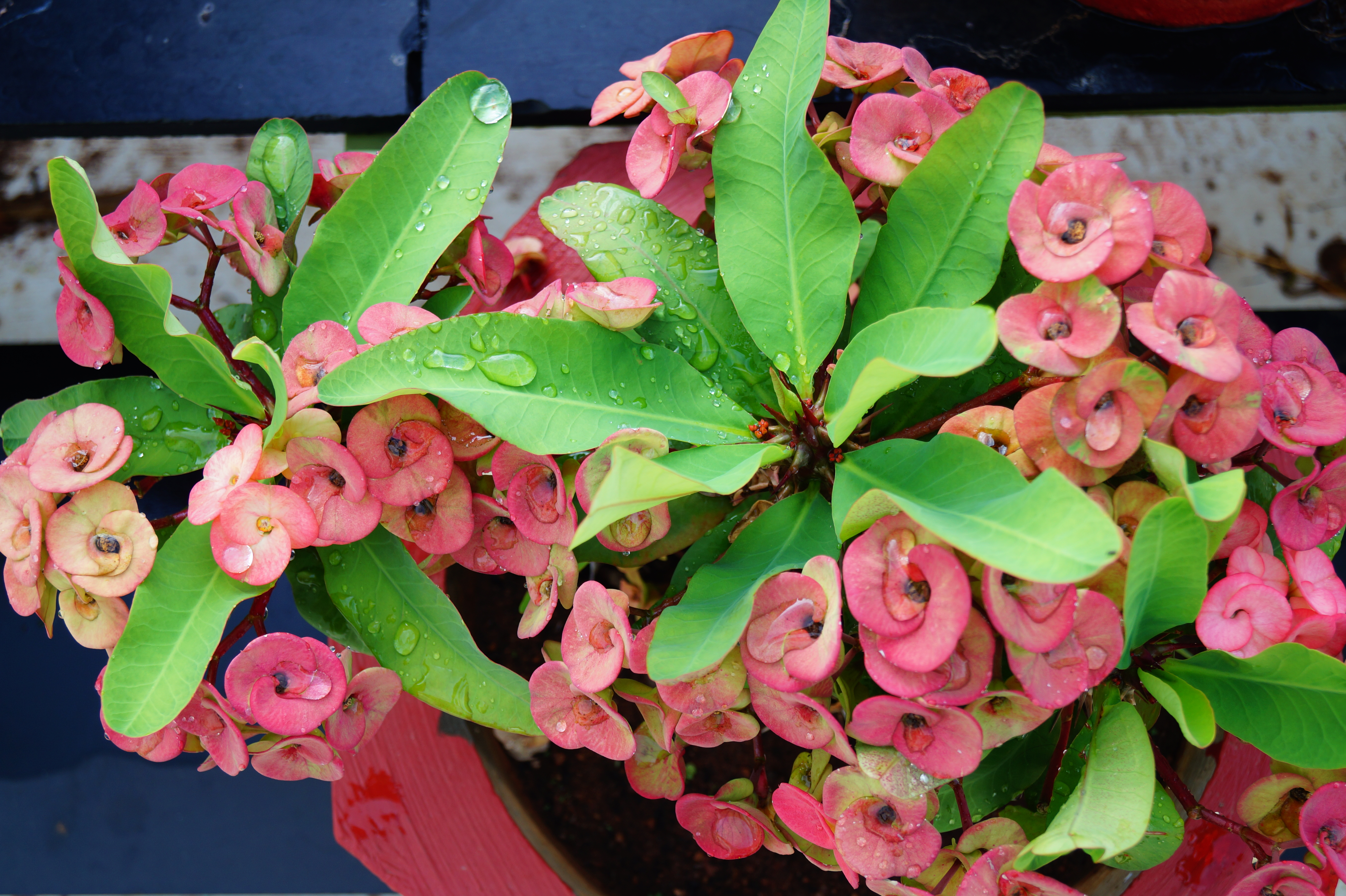

Conservation status
- Least Concern (IUCN 3.1)
- CITES Appendix II (Note: Artificially propagated specimens of cultivars of Euphorbia 'Milii' are not subject to the provisions of CITES when traded in shipments of 100 or more plants and are readily recognizable as artificially propagated specimens.)

Scientific classification
- Kingdom: Plantae
- Clade: Embryophytes
- Clade: Tracheophytes
- Clade: Angiosperms
- Clade: Eudicots
- Clade: Rosids
- Order: Malpighiales
- Family: Euphorbiaceae
- Genus: Euphorbia
- Species: E. milii

Binomial name
- Euphorbia milii Des Moul.

= Euphorbia milii =

Species of plant

Euphorbia milii, the crown-of-thorns, Christ plant or Christ's thorn, is a species of flowering plant in the spurge family, Euphorbiaceae, native to Madagascar. The epithet commemorates Baron Milius, once Governor of Réunion, who introduced the species to France in 1821.

The native Malagasy name for this plant, songosongo, has also been applied to several other Euphorbia species. It is thought that the species was introduced to the Middle East in ancient times; legend, which associates it with the crown-of-thorns worn by Jesus Christ upon his crucifixion, has likely influenced the common name "crown-of-thorns". It is commonly used as an ornamental houseplant but can be grown outside year-round in warmer, frost-free climates.

== Description ==
E. milii is a woody, succulent subshrub or shrub growing up to 1.8 m (5 ft 11 in) tall, depending on cultivar, with densely spiny stems. Some varieties grow in a more horizontal, sprawling, or prostrate manner, while others grow nearly vertically. Certain cultivars are prized for their thinner stems, while many, especially the Thai hybrids, have considerably thicker, substantial stems, measuring several inches in diameter. Just as the flowers and growth habit can vary by cultivar, so too can the sharpness/bluntness or shape and consistency of the spines. On most varieties, the spines will measure up to 3 cm (1.2 in) long, and aid the plant in scrambling over other plants, eventually forming a dense and impenetrable wall. The fleshy, green leaves are found mainly on new growth, and are up to 3.5 cm (1.4 in) long and 1.5 cm (0.59 in) broad. Several variegated varieties exist in cultivation.

The flowers are small, subtended by a pair of conspicuous petal-like bracts, variably red, pink or white, up to 12 mm (0.47 in) broad. The plant thrives between spring and summer but produces flowers all year round. Extrafloral nectaries at the involucre were first reported on E. milii by Teng and Hu 2002.

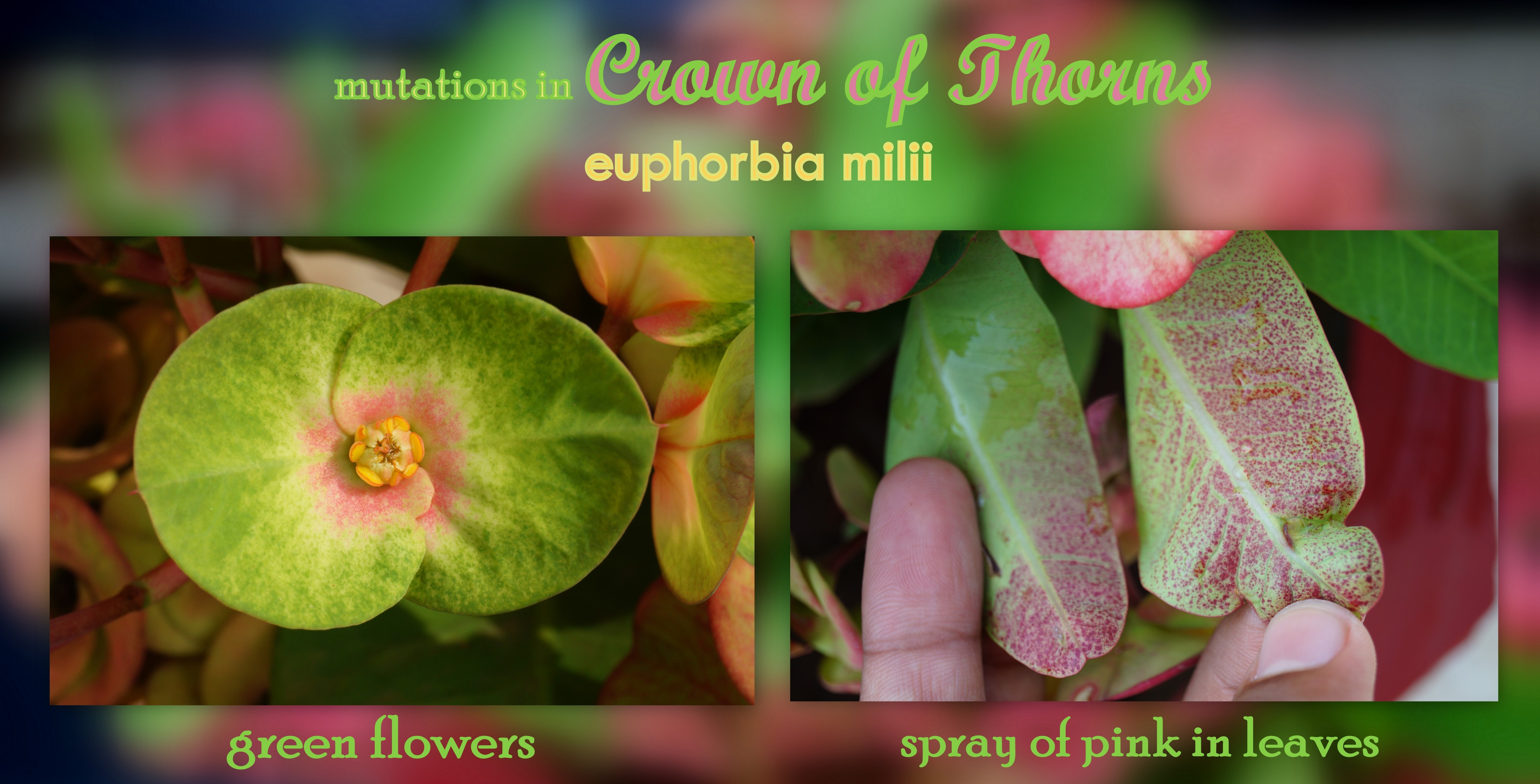
Mutation in Crown of thorns

== Toxicity ==
The sap is moderately poisonous, and causes irritation on contact with skin or eyes. If ingested, it causes severe stomach pain, irritation of the throat and mouth, and vomiting. The poisonous ingredients have been identified as phorbol esters. It is very toxic to domesticated animals such as, horses, sheep, cats and dogs. For humans it is mildly toxic and only acts as an irritant.

== Uses ==
=== Pesticide ===
The plant itself has proven to be an effective molluscicide and a natural alternative to pest control. The World Health Organization (WHO) has recommended the usage of Euphorbia milii in aiding snail control. Especially in endemic countries. Schistosomiasis is an infectious disease from freshwater parasites, carried by snails. Extracts from the plant are used to control the snail population to avoid getting infected from a parasite.

== Varieties ==
E. milii is a variable species, and several varieties have been described; some of these are treated as distinct species by some authors. E. milii var. splendens (syn. E. splendens) is considered to be the living embodiment of the supreme deity in Bathouism, a minority religion practiced by the Bodo people of Eastern India and Nepal.

- Euphorbia milii var. bevilaniensis (Croizat) Ursch & Leandri 1955
- Euphorbia milii var. hislopii (N.E.Br.) Ursch & Leandri 1955 (syn. E. hislopii)
- Euphorbia milii var. imperatae (Leandri) Ursch & Leandri 1955
- Euphorbia milii var. longifolia Rauh 1967
- Euphorbia milii var. milii
- Euphorbia milii var. roseana Marn.-Lap. 1962
- Euphorbia milii var. splendens (Bojer ex Hook.) Ursch & Leandri 1955
- Euphorbia milii var. tananarivae (Leandri) Ursch & Leandri 1955
- Euphorbia milii var. tenuispina Rauh & Razaf. 1991
- Euphorbia milii var. tulearensis Ursch & Leandri 1955
- Euphorbia milii var. vulcanii (Leandri) Ursch & Leandri 1955

== Cultivation ==
Euphorbia milii can be propagated from cuttings. E. milii is not hardy, and does not tolerate temperatures below 10 °C (50 °F). In temperate areas it needs to be grown under glass in full sun. During the summer it may be placed outside in a sheltered spot, when all risk of frost is absent. The species and the variety E. milii var. splendens have both gained the Royal Horticultural Society's Award of Garden Merit.

Wat Phrik in Thailand claims to be the home of the world's tallest Christ thorn plant.

== Gallery ==
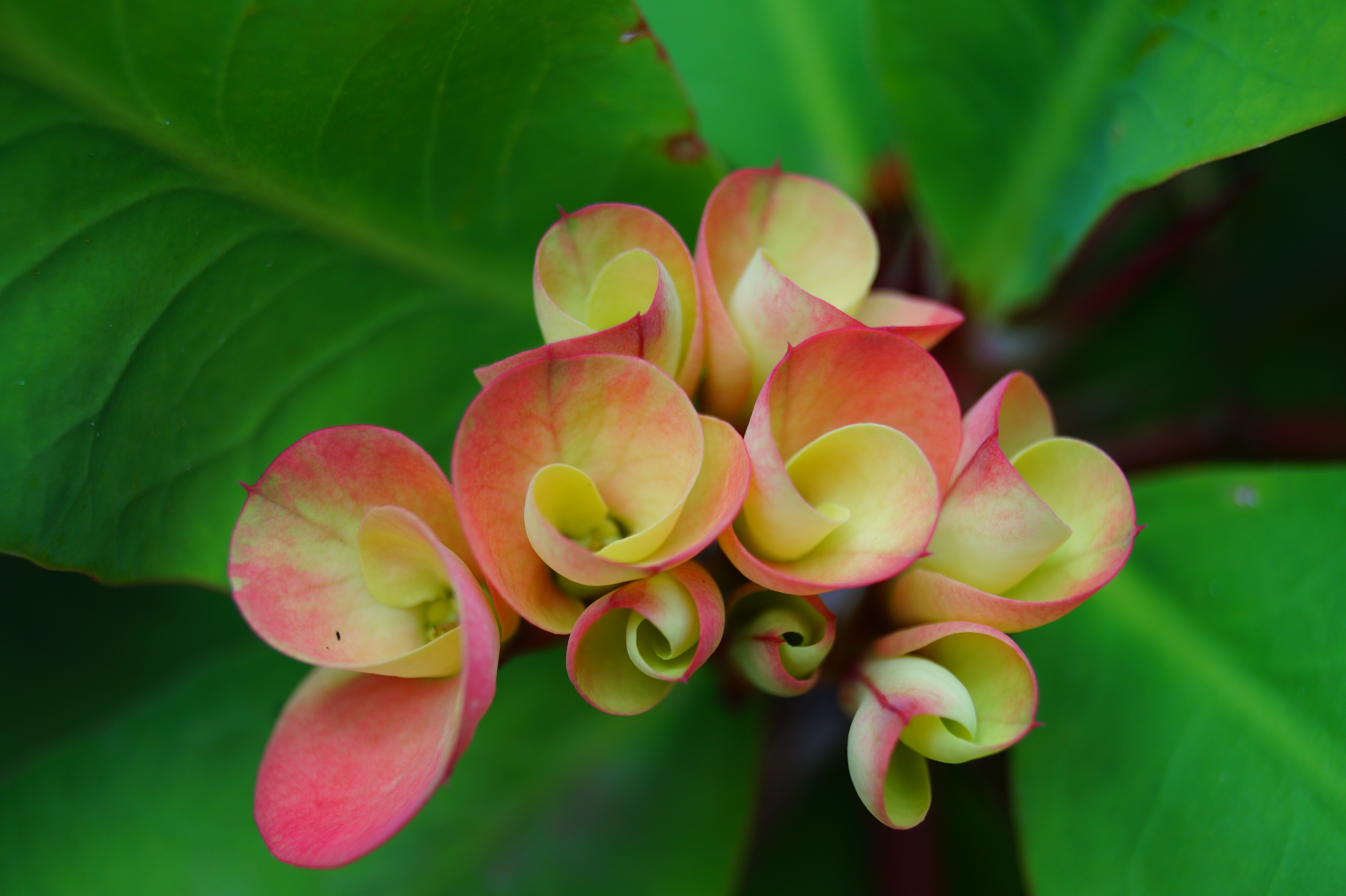
Christ thorn inflorescences (cyathia) opening

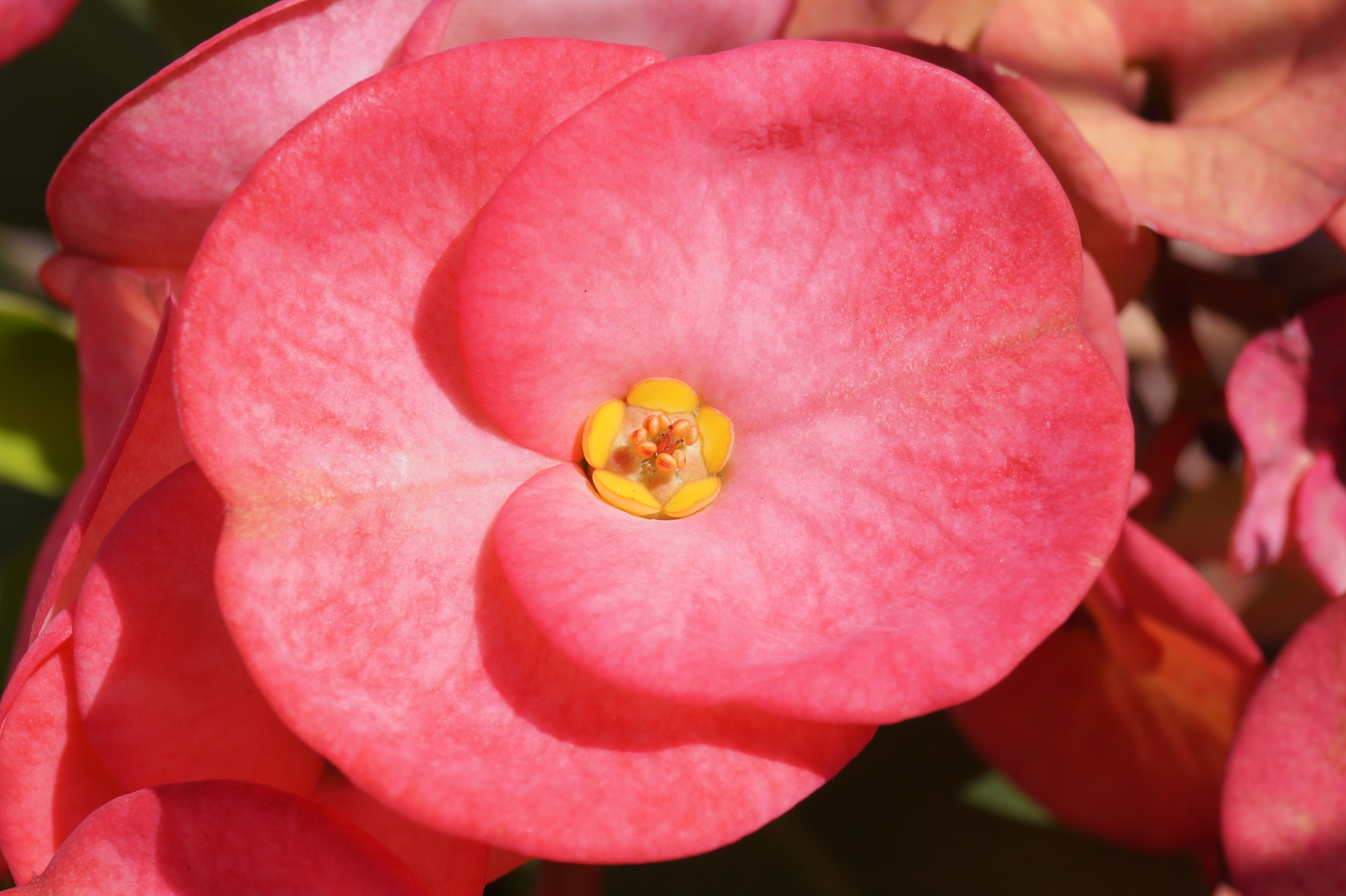
Christ thorn inflorescence (cyathium) close up view

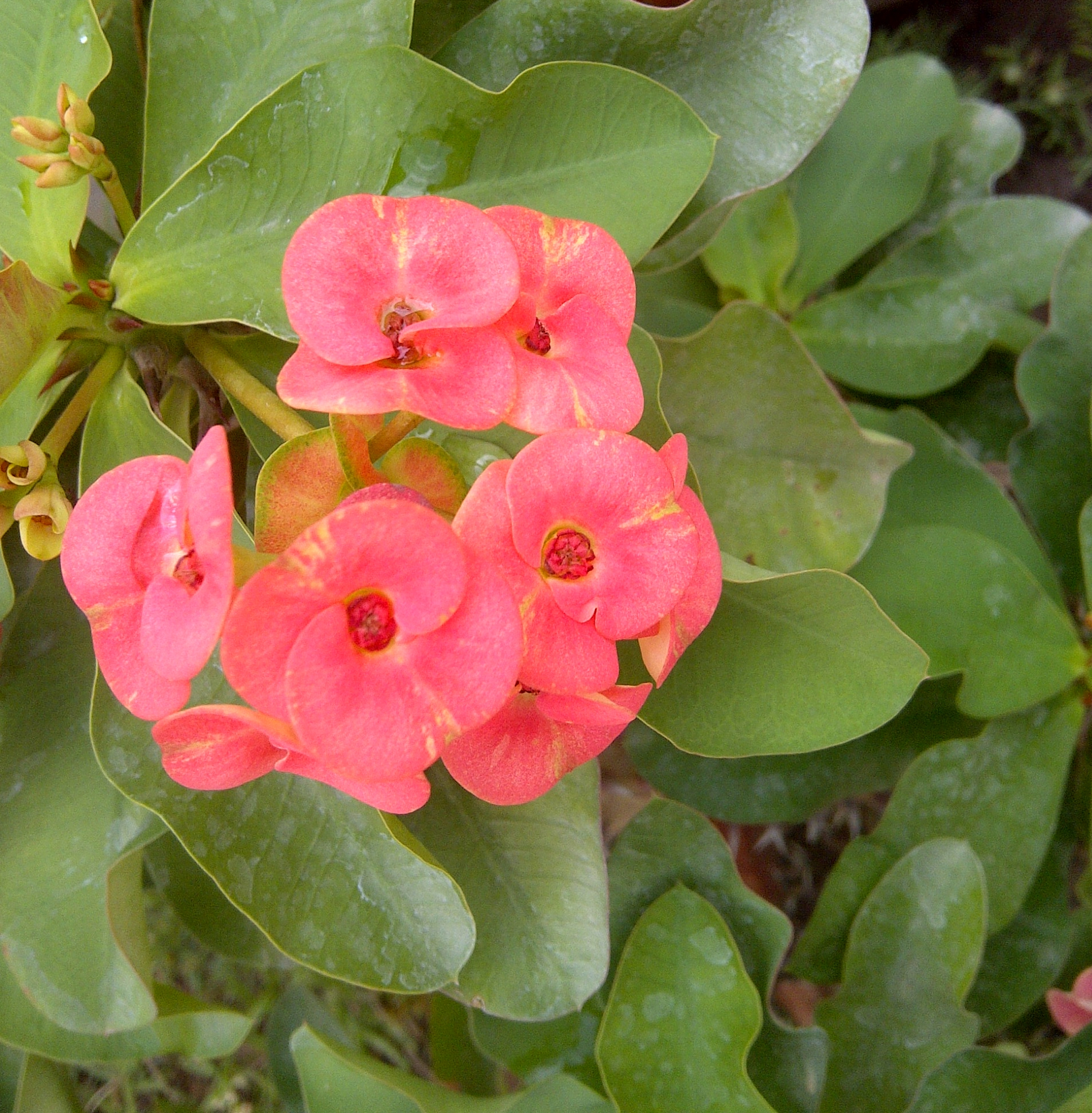
Euphorbia milii var splendens

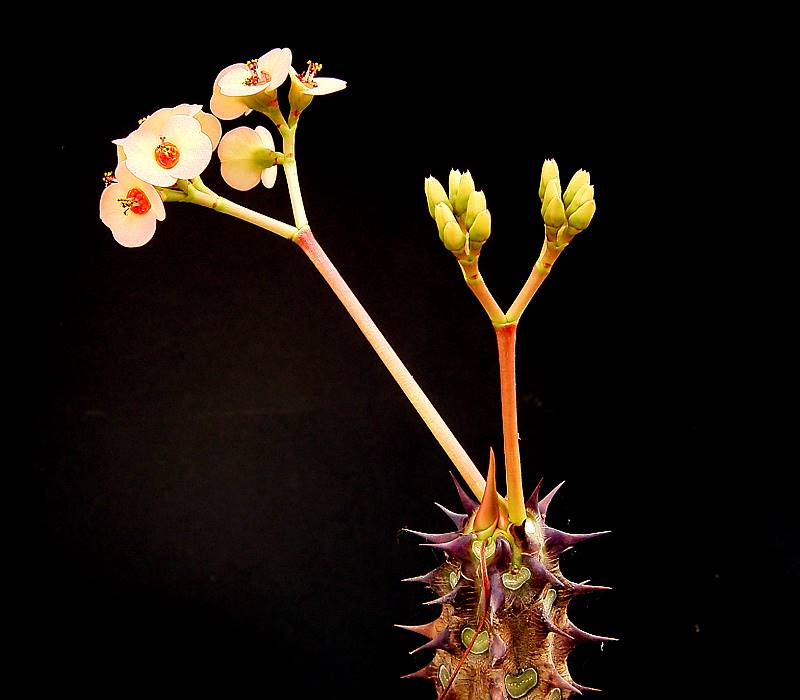
Euphorbia milii var. vulcanii

Euphorbia milii var. milii

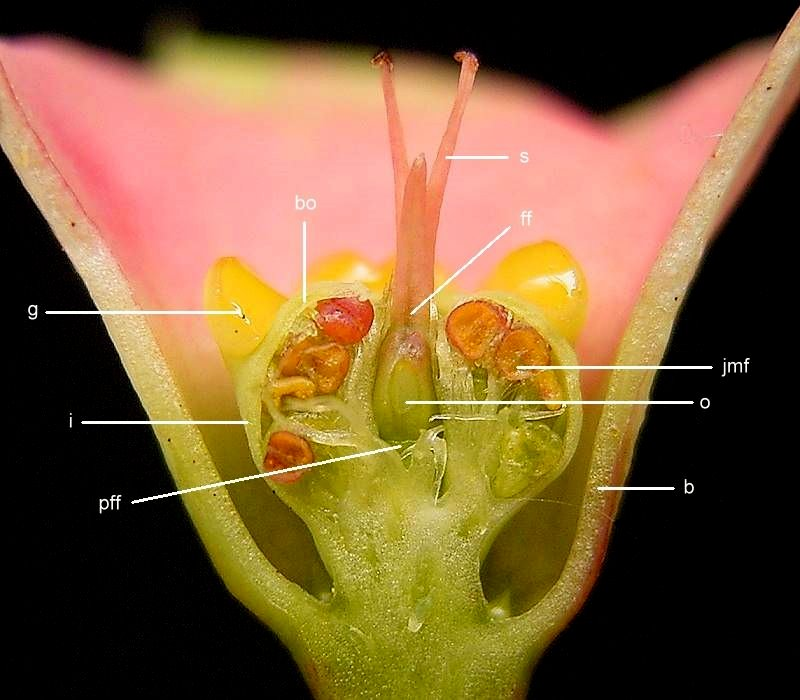
Longitudinal section of the cyathium

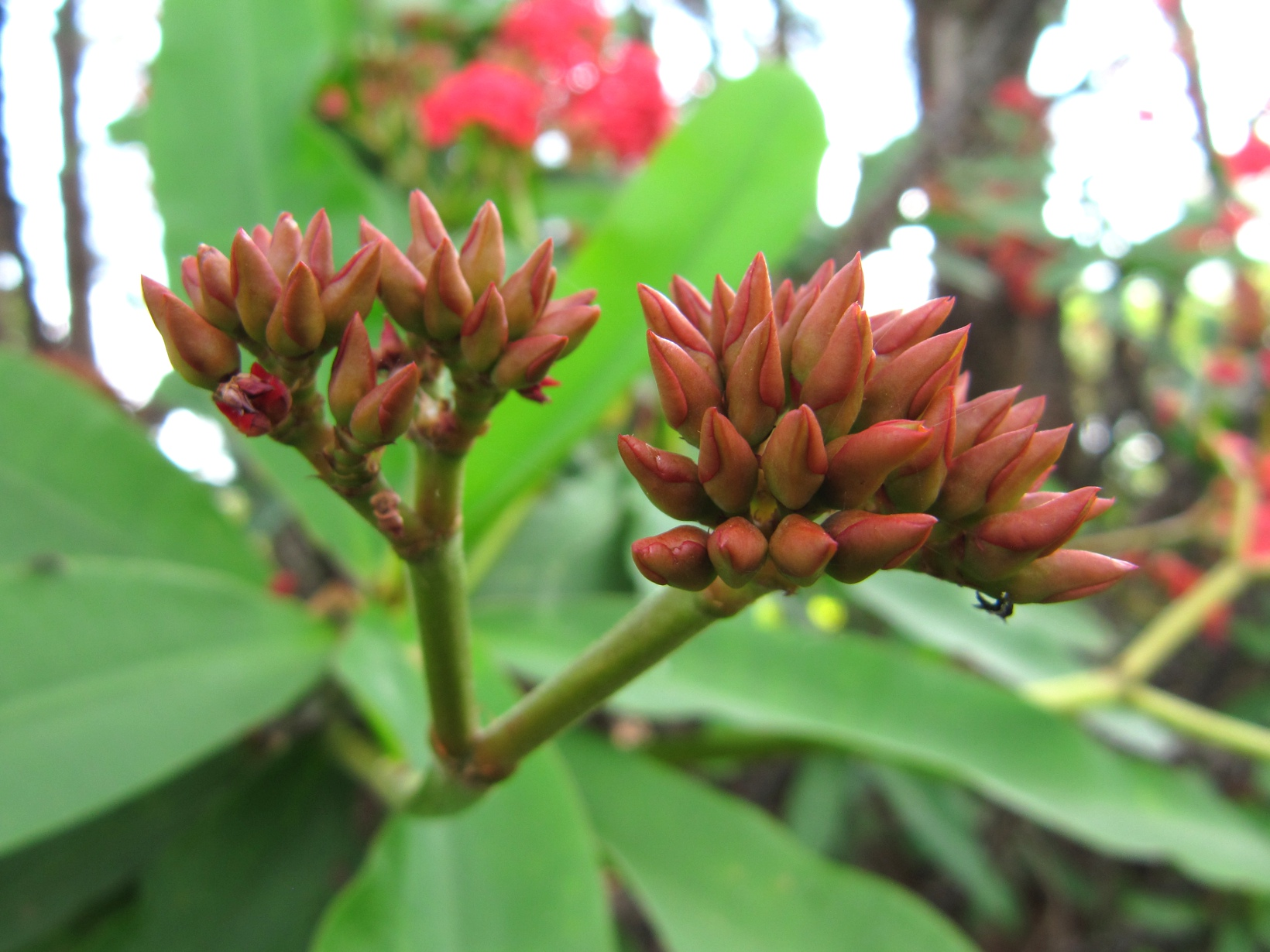
Flower buds of crown-of-thorns (Euphorbia milii).

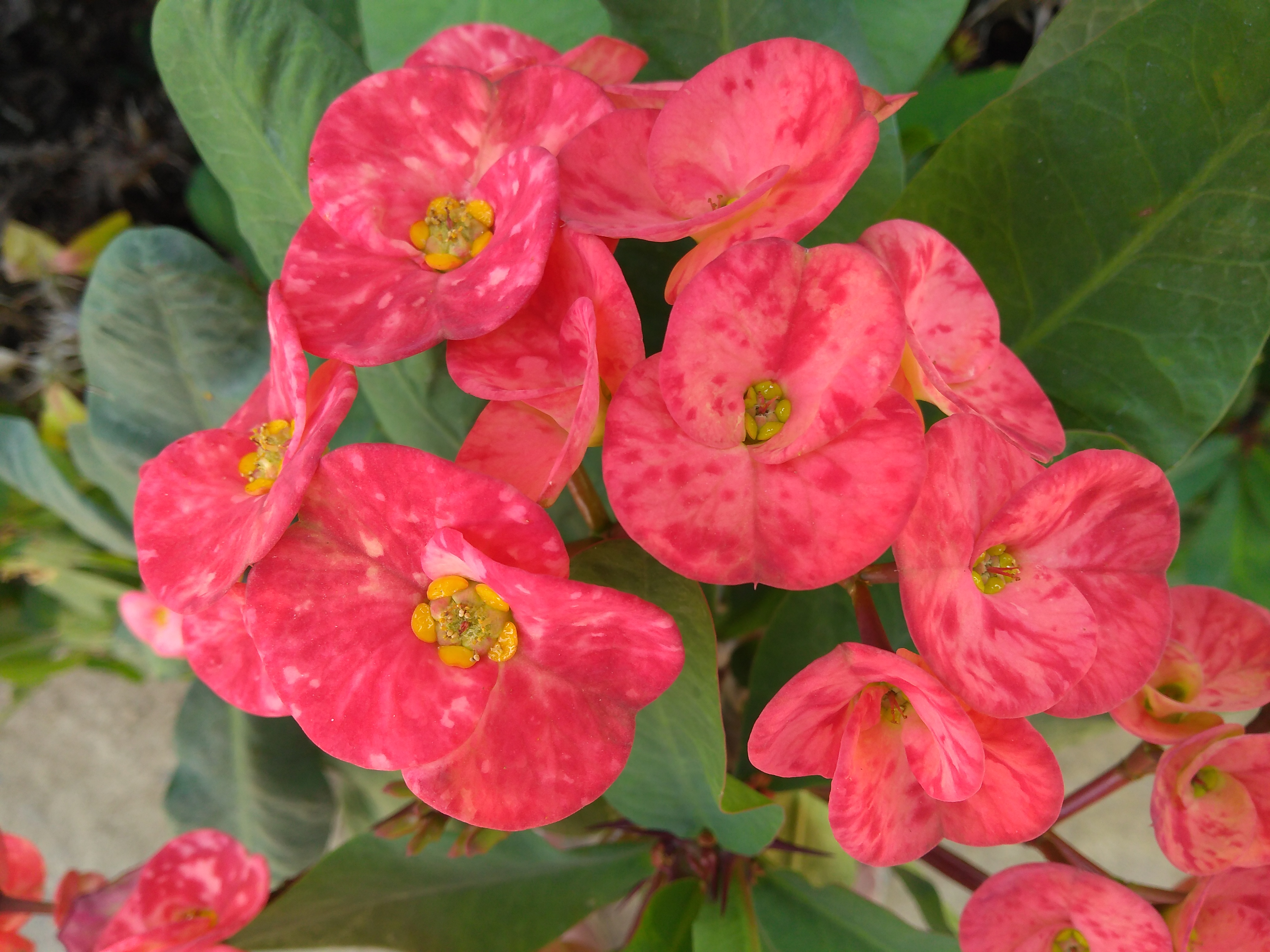
Infected euphorbia inflorescences (cyathia)

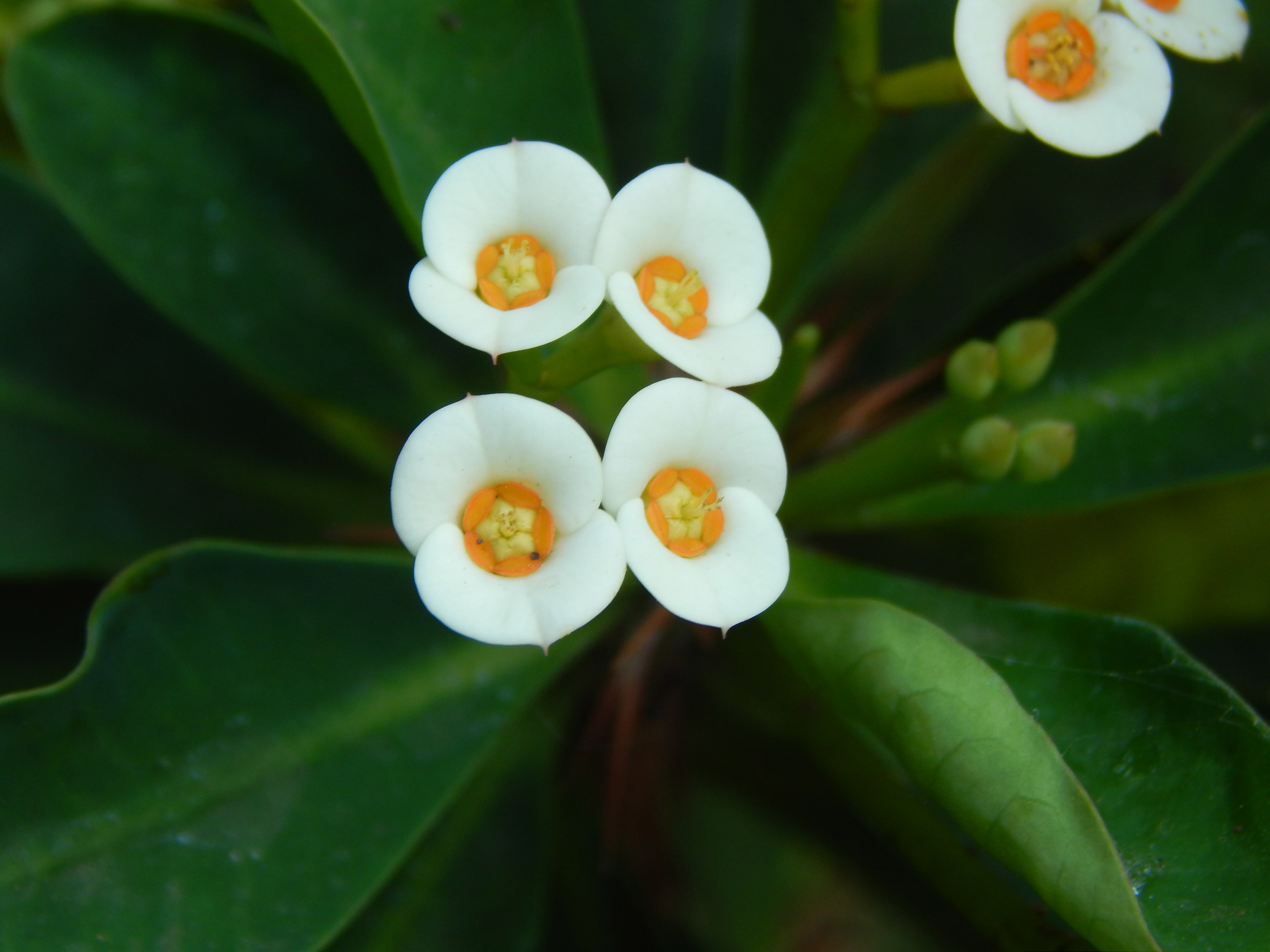
Euphorbia milii from Kerala, India

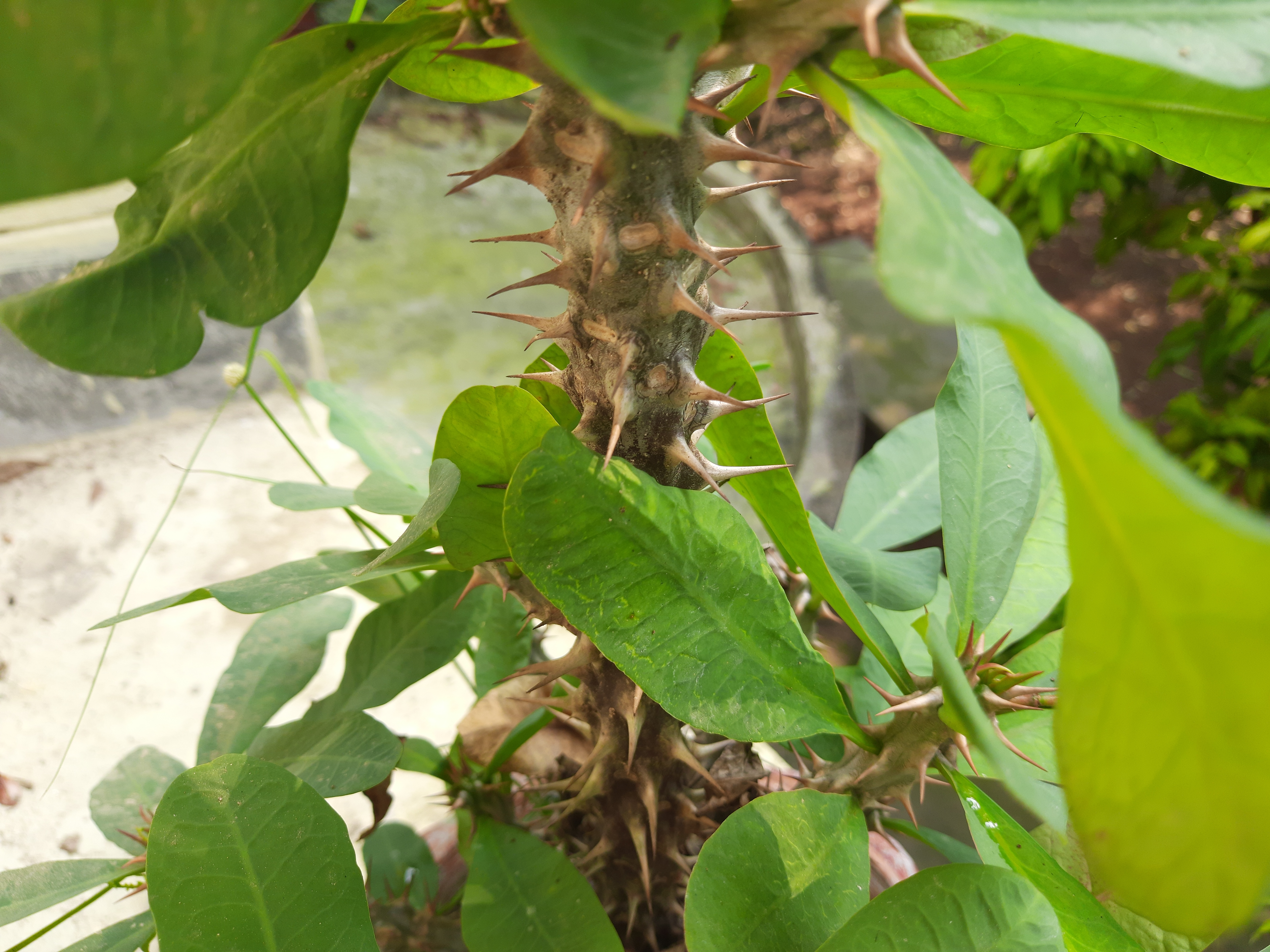
Thorns of Euphorbia milii.

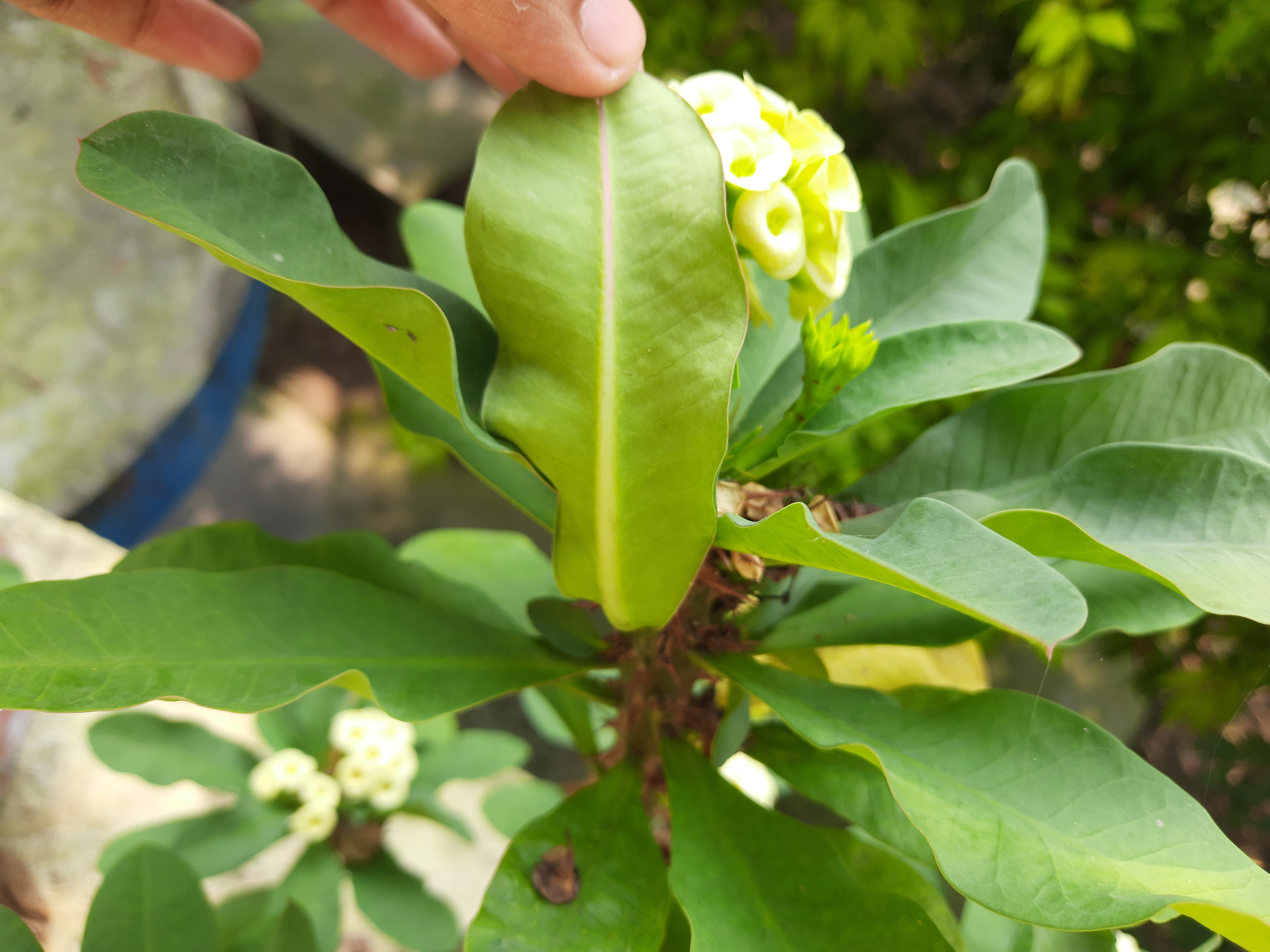
Leaf of Euphorbia milii from the back.

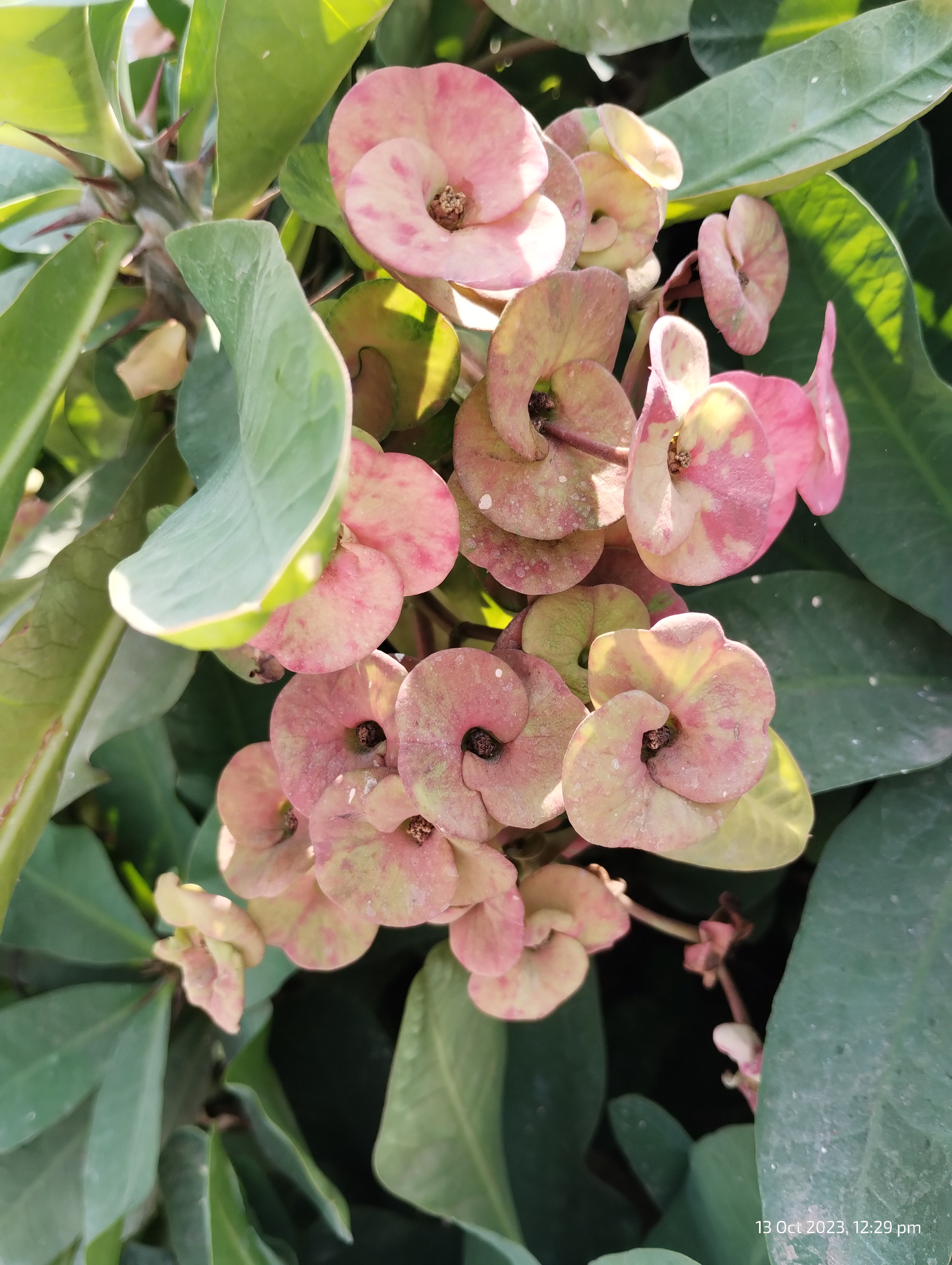
Euphoria milii from Haryana, India
