= Alexandre Marnier-Lapostolle =

French distiller

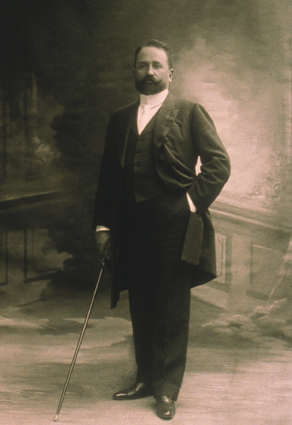
Louis-Alexandre Marnier-Lapostolle, creator of the Grand Marnier liqueur

Louis-Alexandre Marnier-Lapostolle (born Marnier; 4 March 1857 – 29 January 1930) was a French businessman who developed Grand Marnier, an orange-flavored cognac liqueur, in 1880. He learned how to distill from his father, a wine-and-spirit merchant.

== Bibliography ==
- Profile Grand Marnier
