= Hermann Johannes Heinrich Jacobsen =

Hermann Jacobsen
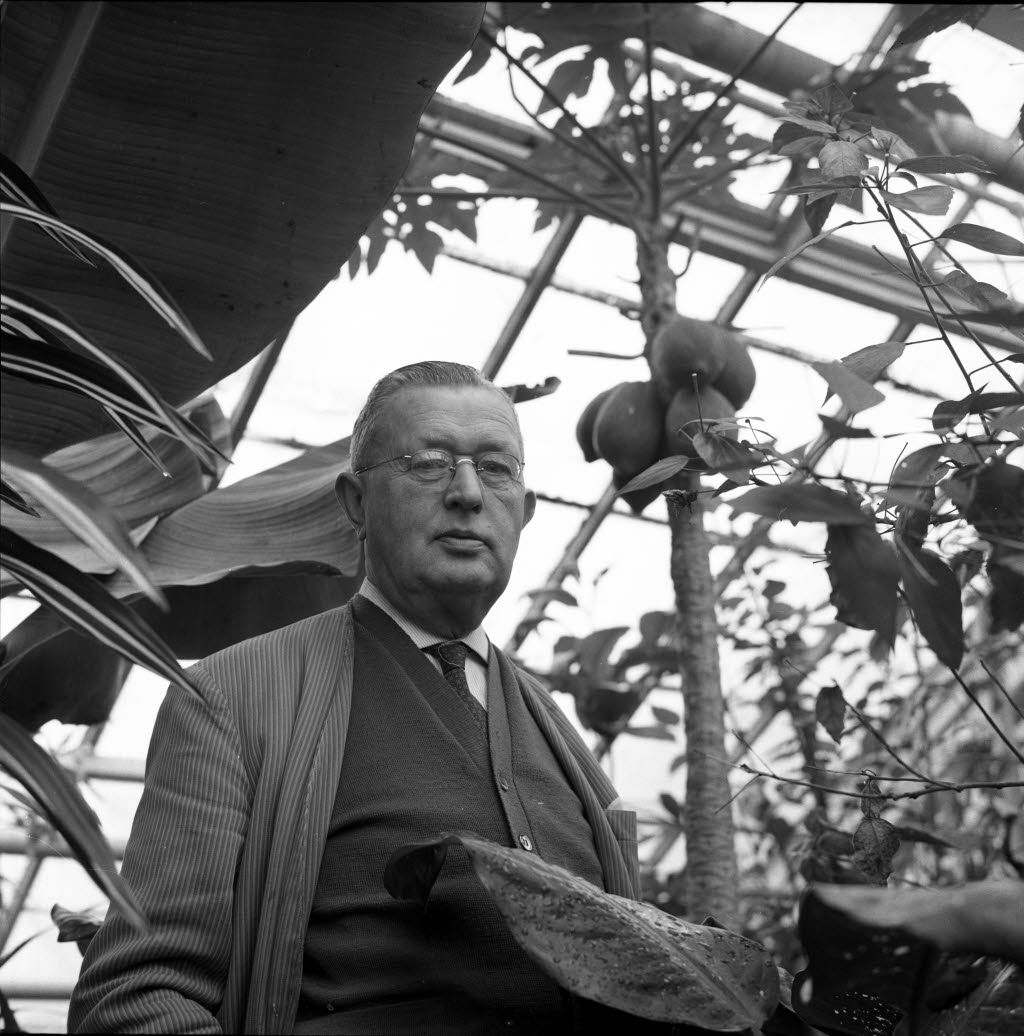
- Jacobsen, 1963

Hermann Jacobsen (January 26, 1898 in Hamburg-August 19, 1978 in Kiel) was a German succulent researcher and horticulturist. Jacobsen directed the Botanischer Garten Kiel from 1929 to 1963. The standard author abbreviation H.Jacobsen is used to indicate this person as the author when citing a botanical name.

== Species identified ==
- Kalanchoe marnieriana
- Agave salmiana
- Curio rowleyanus
