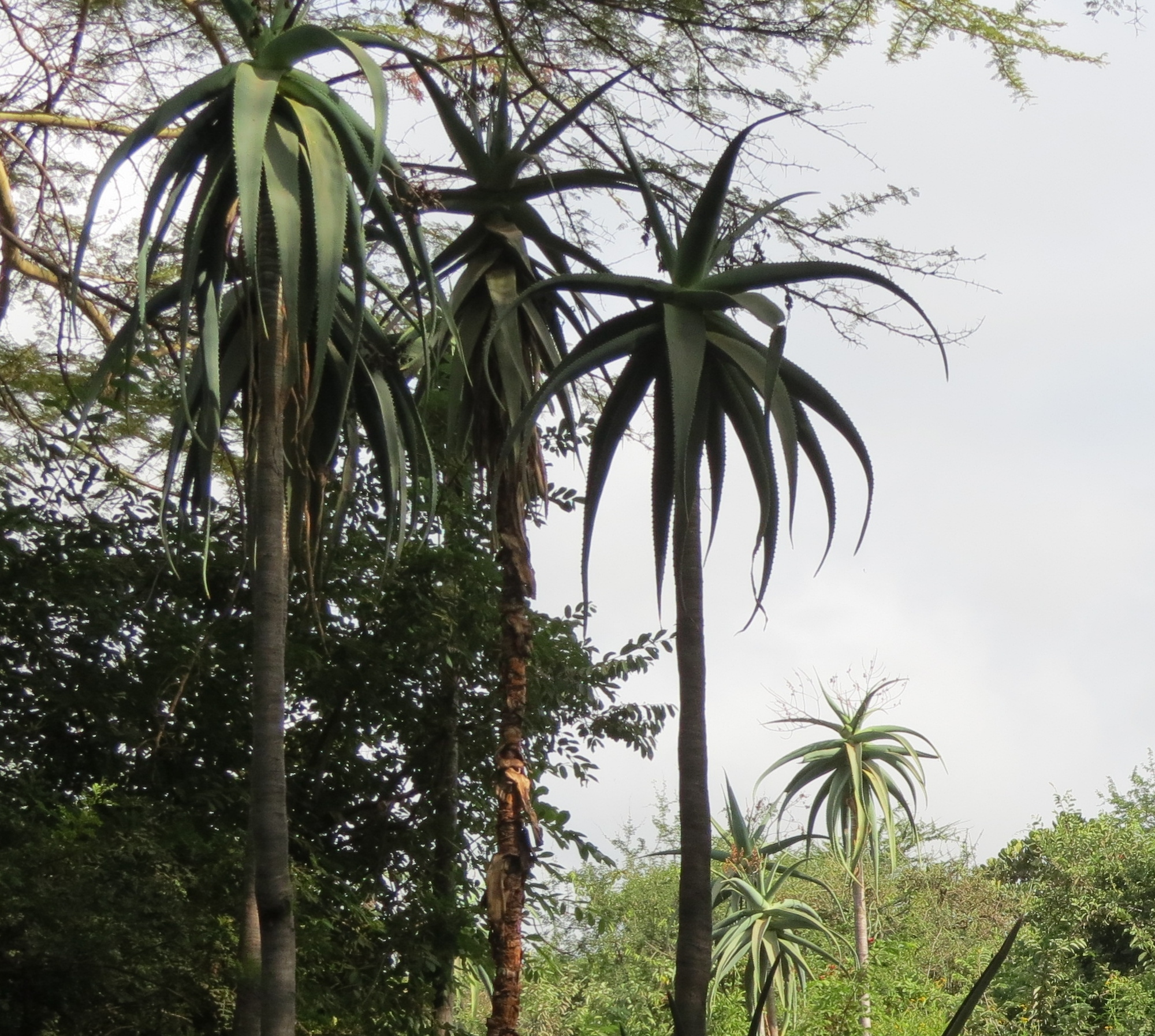
- Aloe ballyi photographed in Arusha, Tanzania

Conservation status
- Endangered (IUCN 3.1)
- CITES Appendix II (CITES)

Scientific classification
- Kingdom: Plantae
- Clade: Tracheophytes
- Clade: Angiosperms
- Clade: Monocots
- Order: Asparagales
- Family: Asphodelaceae
- Subfamily: Asphodeloideae
- Genus: Aloe
- Species: A. ballyi

Binomial name
- Aloe ballyi Reynolds

= Aloe ballyi =

Species of succulent

Aloe ballyi (the "rat aloe") is a species of flowering plant in the family Asphodelaceae, native to Kenya and Tanzania.

== Description ==
This species of Aloe forms tall, slender stems of up to 6 meters. The leaves are long, slender, and mostly straight - only recurving slightly towards the tips. Dead leaves do not long remain on the stem, unlike in the case of most aloes. Unlike most aloes, the "rat aloe" is poisonous.

The flowers are only mildly tubular, with their segments united for 1/3 of their length.

== Distribution ==
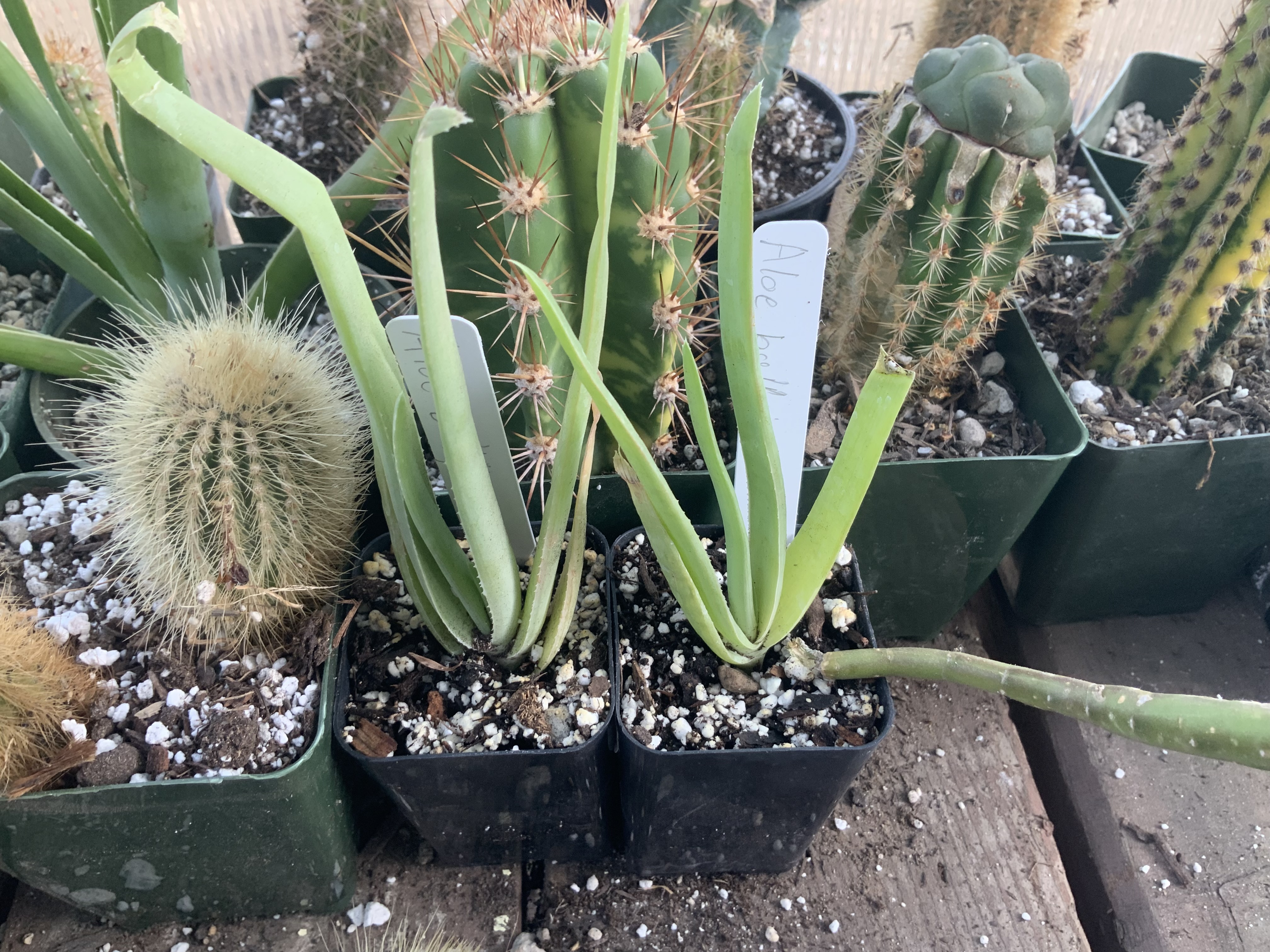
Small plant

It is native to the Eastern Arc Mountains and coastal forests of Kenya and Tanzania. This rare aloe grows in the bush with acacias and succulents.
