= Les Cèdres =

Private garden in France

Coordinates: 43.6916°N 7.3262°E

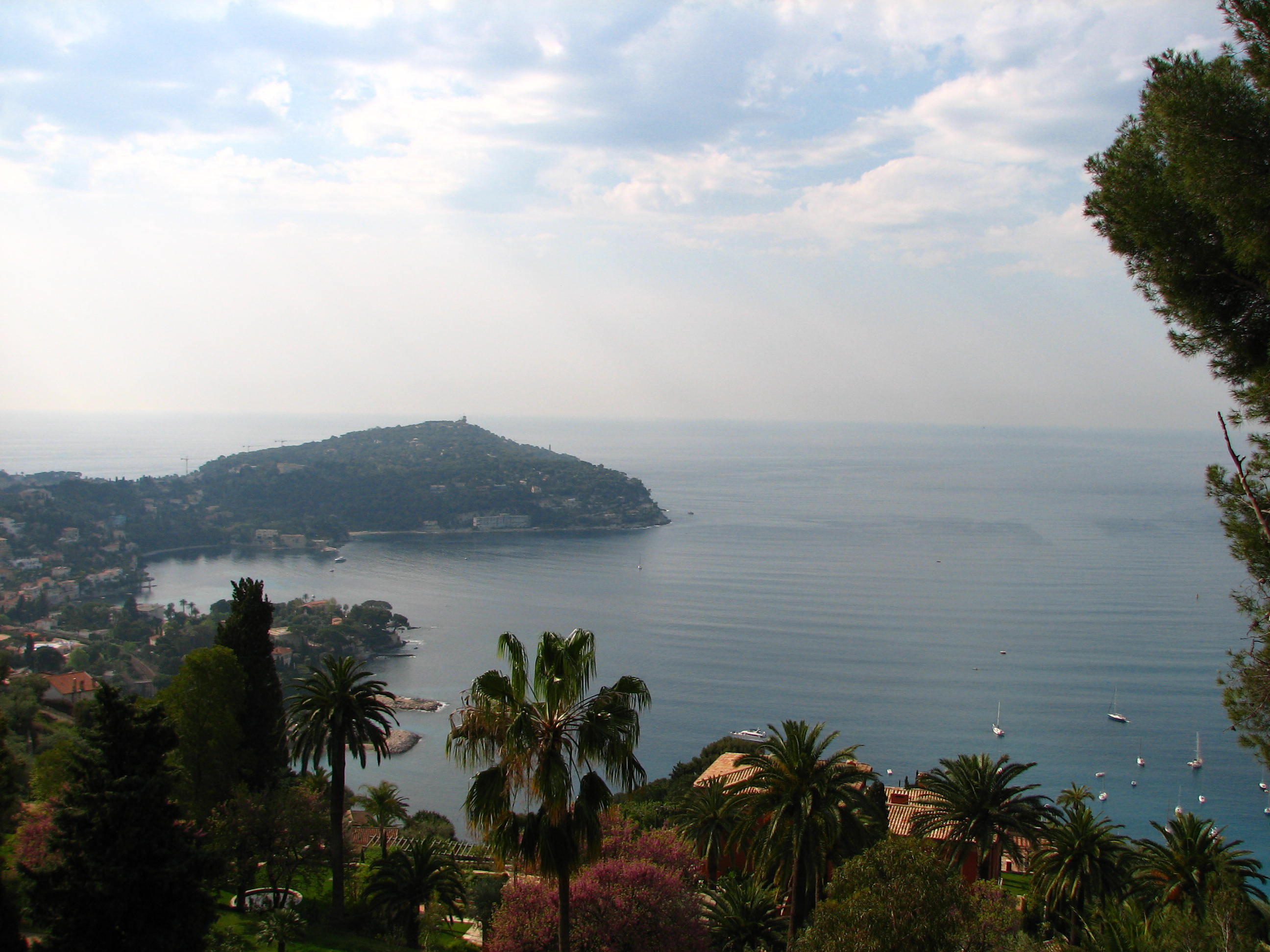
Cap Ferrat

The Jardin botanique "Les Cèdres" (French pronunciation: [ʒaʁdɛ̃ bɔtanik lɛ sɛːdʁ]) (14 hectares), often called simply Les Cèdres or the Jardin de la villa "Les Cèdres", is a private botanical garden located at 57 Avenue Denis Séméria, Saint-Jean-Cap-Ferrat, Alpes-Maritimes, Provence-Alpes-Côte d'Azur, France.

== History ==
The garden was established in 1924 on the grounds of the villa "Les Cèdres", constructed in 1830 in the Sardinian style, once the property of King Leopold II of Belgium, and the most expensive home in the world. In 1924 the property was purchased by Alexandre Marnier-Lapostolle, founder of the society of Grand Marnier. In 1928 his son Julien intensified the cultivation of exotic plants. The Marnier-Lapostolle family used the garden to source the bitter oranges known as bigarades which they used to flavour Grand Marnier. Since 1976 the garden has been owned by the Société des Produits Marnier-Lapostolle, which was acquired by Campari in 2016.

Today the garden contains more than 14,000 species of tropical plants, with the most tender (roughly two-thirds of the total number of species) kept in 25 heated greenhouses. It is said to be one of the largest collections of tropical plants in Europe, and includes a palm grove, a collection of bamboos, and an equatorial forest grove. The garden is considered among the top 10 botanical gardens in the world, and was listed as a French national heritage site in 2008.

The collections include Euphorbia coerulescens, Myrtillocactus geometrizans, and specimens of Aizoaceae, Aloe, Araceae, Amaryllidaceae, Bromeliaceae, Euphorbiaceae, Cactaceae, Calymmanthium, Crassulaceae, Liliaceae, and Palmae. The Villa was set for sale in August 2018, with the price tag of $1.1 Billion.

== See also ==
- List of botanical gardens in France
