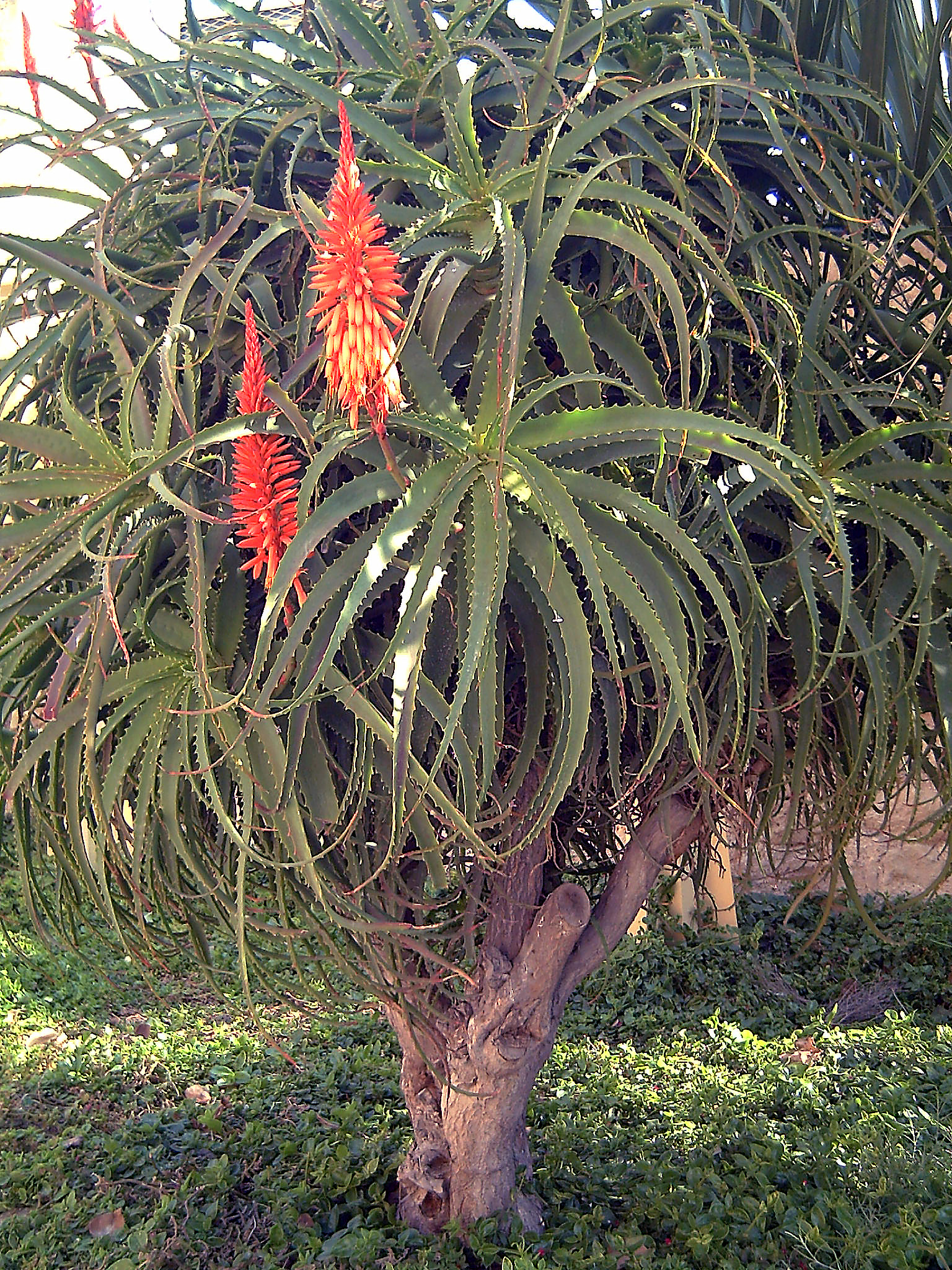
- Aloe Kedongensis habit, "Castell de la Santa Bàrbara", Alicante, Spain

Conservation status
- CITES Appendix II (CITES)

Scientific classification
- Kingdom: Plantae
- Clade: Tracheophytes
- Clade: Angiosperms
- Clade: Monocots
- Order: Asparagales
- Family: Asphodelaceae
- Subfamily: Asphodeloideae
- Genus: Aloe
- Species: A. kedongensis

Binomial name
- Aloe kedongensis Reynolds

Synonyms
- Aloe nyeriensis subsp. kedongensis (Reynolds) S.Carter

= Aloe kedongensis =

Species of aloe

Aloe kedongensis (the "Kenyan Aloe") is a species of aloe which occurs in Kenya and northern Tanzania.

Along with Aloe dawei and Aloe rivae, it is very commonly used for hedges in East Africa.

== Description ==
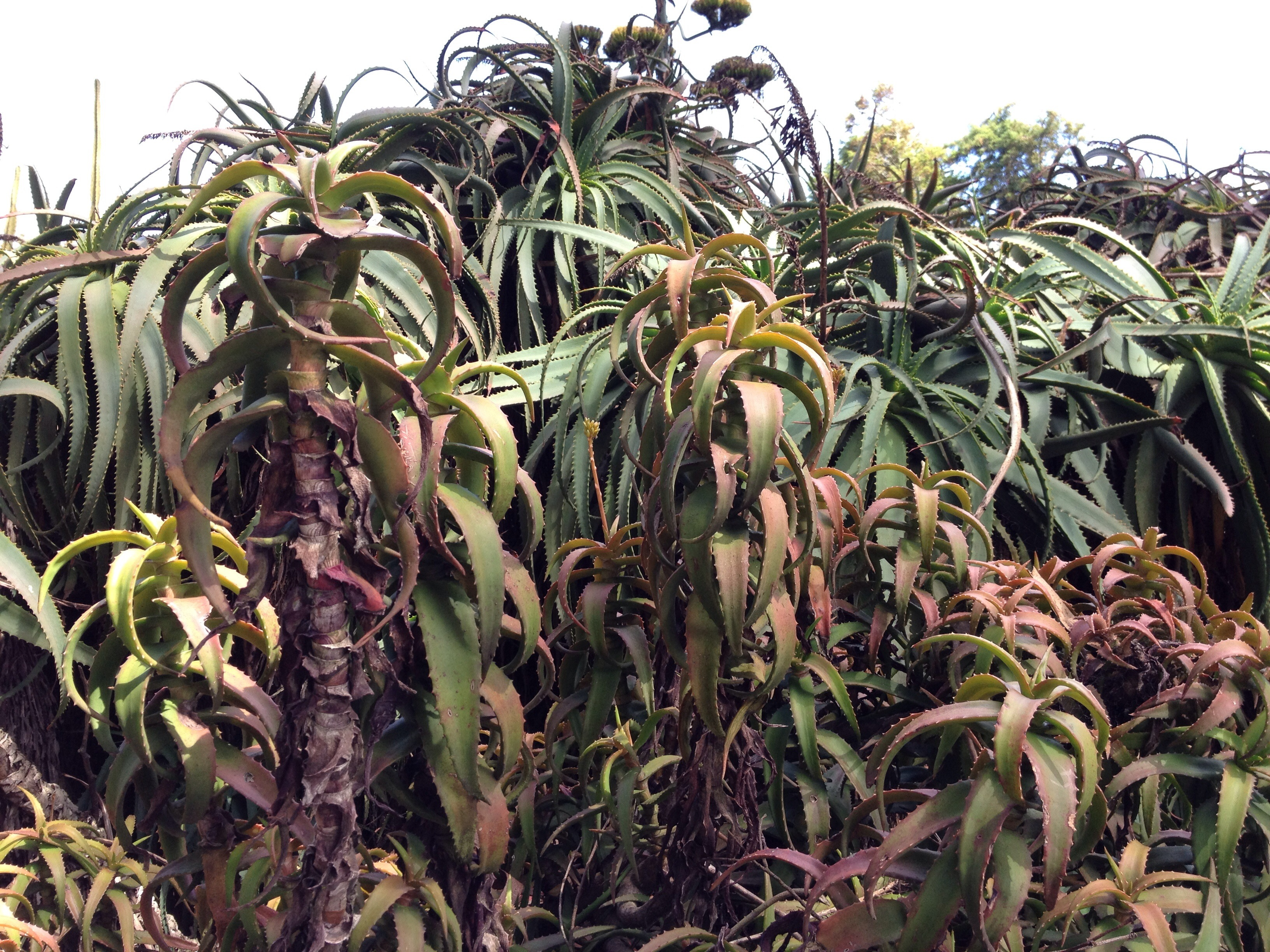
Aloe kedongensis stems (foreground)

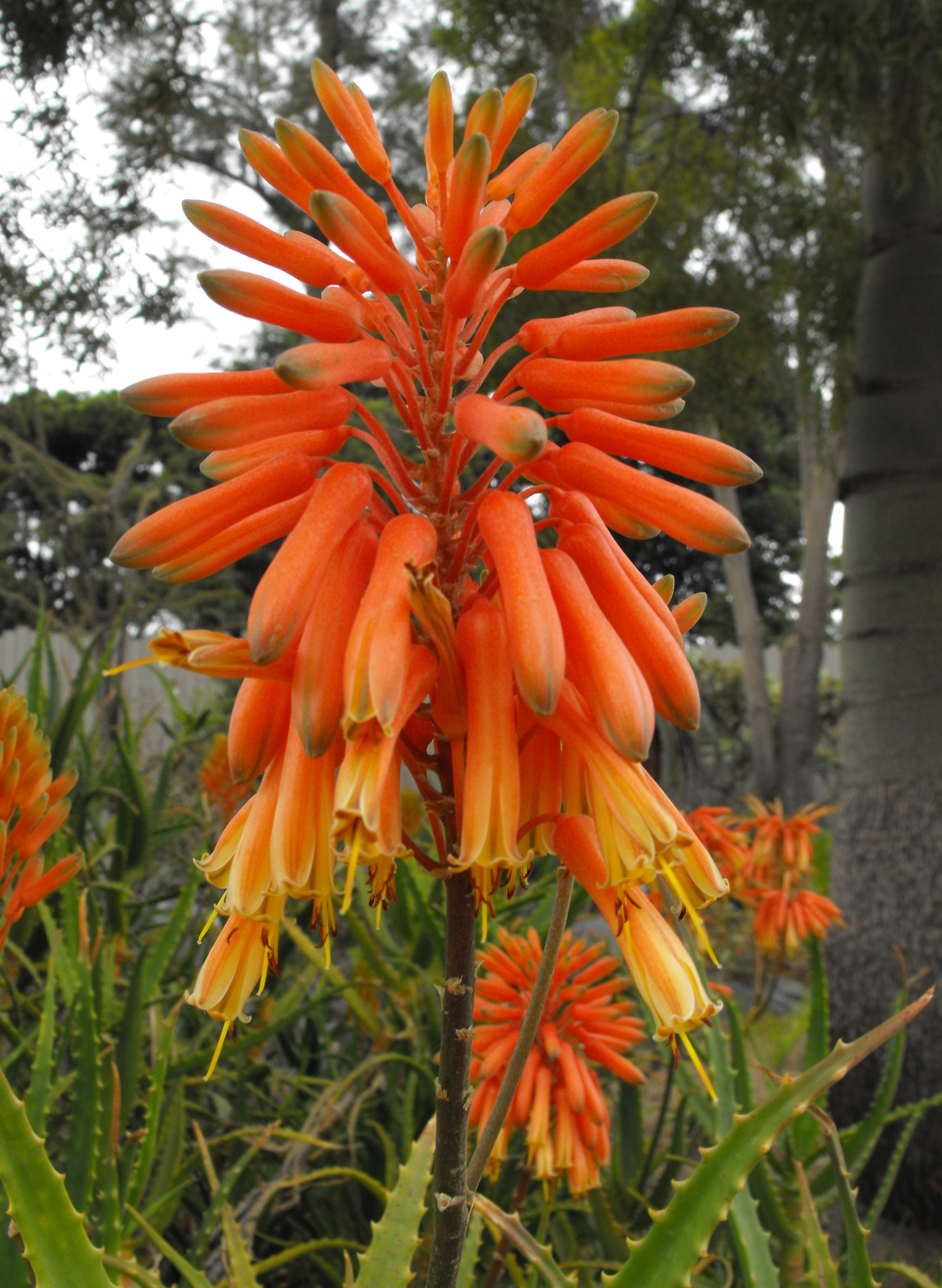
Orange-red flowers of Aloe kedongensis, showing their flared-out lobe-tips

Aloe kedongensis branches from the base to form thick clumps of stems, each up to 4 meters long, and either erect or sprawling on the ground. The slender leaves (60 cm long, 3.5 cm wide) are recurved and without any markings (though the leaves of very young plants often have occasional white blotches on them).

The 50 cm tall inflorescence sometimes has a branch or two, with cylindrical racemes. The tubular flowers are red, 3–4 cm long, and born on 2–3 cm pedicels. The tips of the flower lobes curve outwards.

== Genetics and relatives ==
Aloe kedongensis is a tetraploid, with four sets of chromosomes. It is part of a unique group of closely related tetraploid aloes in East Africa, which all share a recent common ancestor, and occur near to each other in a variety of habitats within the region. The other five species of this group are:

- Aloe cheranganiensis
- Aloe dawei (distinguished by its shorter [1.4 cm] pedicels, shorter [3.5 cm] perianths, and wider [6–9 cm] leaves)
- Aloe elgonica (distinguished by its longer [4 cm] perianth, and wider [9 cm] leaves)
- Aloe ngobitensis (distinguished by its wider [5 cm] leaves)
- Aloe nyeriensis (distinguished by its wider [6 cm] leaves, longer [4 cm] perianth, more branched inflorescence, and shorter [1.5 cm] pedicels)
