= Umtiza Nature Reserve =

Forest nature reserve in the Eastern Cape

- IUCN category IV (habitat/species management area)
- Interactive map of Umtiza Nature Reserve
- Location: South Africa
- Nearest city: East London, Eastern Cape
- Coordinates: 33°01′01″S 27°48′28″E
- Area: Umtiza Nature Reserve: 5.67 km^{2} (2.19 sq mi); Grey Dell and Fort Grey Controlled Forest Area: 1,858.48 hectares (4,592.4 acres); World Database on Protected Areas
- Designated: 5 July 1985; 40 years ago
- Administrator: Eastern Cape Parks & Tourism
- Type: Forest Nature Reserve
- Status: Open all year
- Hiking trails: Three
- WDPA ID: 555563541
- Website: Buffalo City Tourism

The Umtiza Nature Reserve is one of two forest nature reserves in the greater East London Coast Nature Reserve. It is named after Umtiza listeriana, a rare and protected legume found within the reserve. The Buffalo River borders the northern part of the reserve, and includes the remaining Umtiza Forest on the southern banks of the river. The Buffalo Pass traverses the entirety of the reserve and the surrounding Controlled Forest Area.

== History ==
The Fort Grey State forest which is found south of the current reserve, was proclaimed a protected forest prior to the Union of South Africa. In 2020, an area of 1,858.48 ha (4,592.4 acres) surrounding the reserve, which include the Grey Dell and Fort Grey forest areas, and private farmland, were declared a Controlled Forest Area to prevent deforestation and rehabilitate the remaining Umtiza Forest.

Grey Dell and Fort Grey Controlled Forest Area encompassing the Umtiza Nature Reserve below the Buffalo River

== Biodiversity ==
A variety of wildlife is found within the reserve.

=== Birds ===
There are 30-40 bird species in the reserve, including:

- African dusky flycatcher
- African finfoot
- Brown scrub robin
- Knysna woodpecker
- Narina trogon
- Lemon dove
- Yellow-throated woodland warbler

=== Mammals ===
Samango monkeys along with bushbuck, common duiker, blue duiker, tree dassies and porcupines can be found in the reserve.

=== Vegetation ===
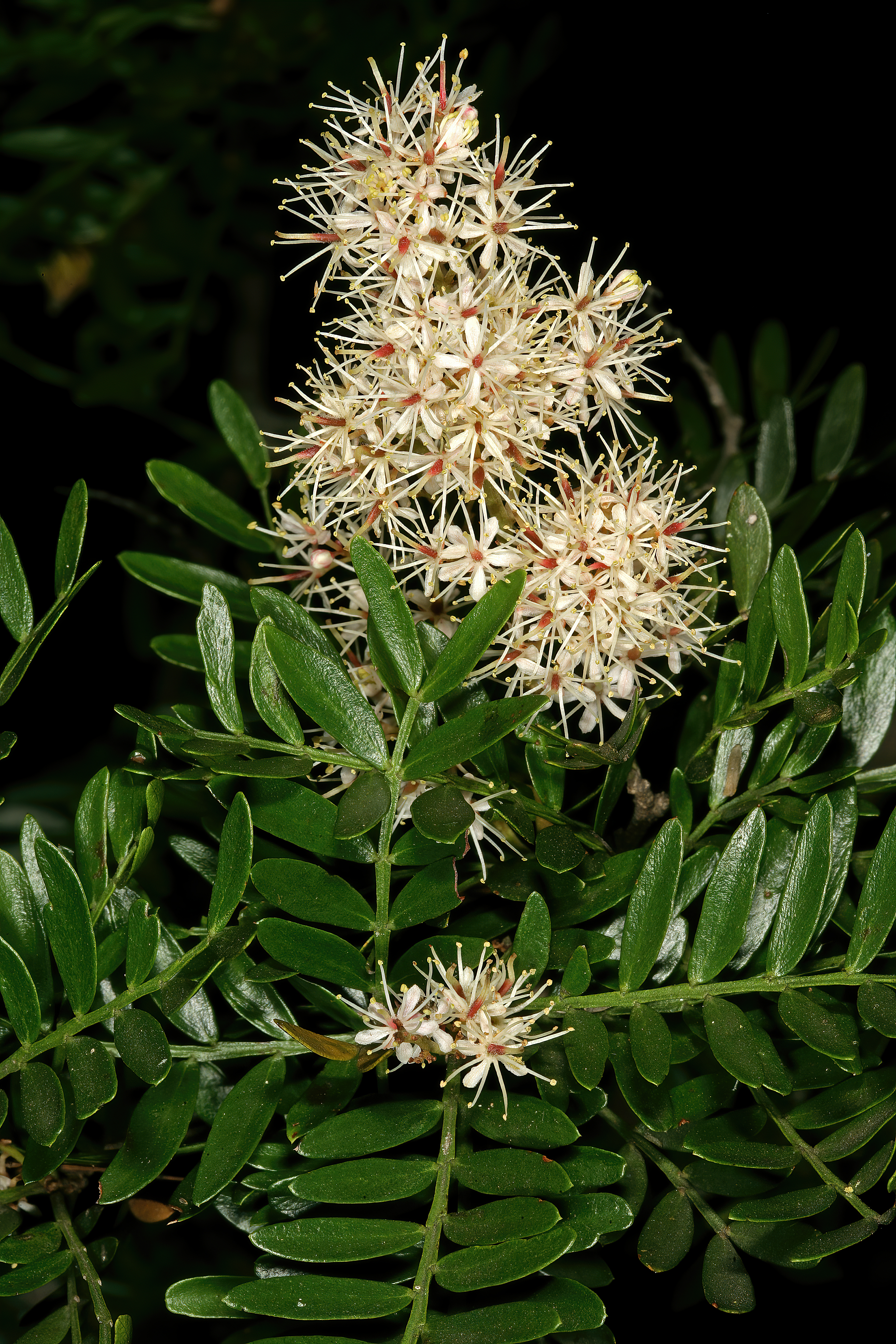
Umtiza listeriana flowers at the Pretoria National Botanical Garden.

The reserve is one of the last refuges of the vulnerable Umtiza listeriana.

== See also ==
- List of protected areas of South Africa
