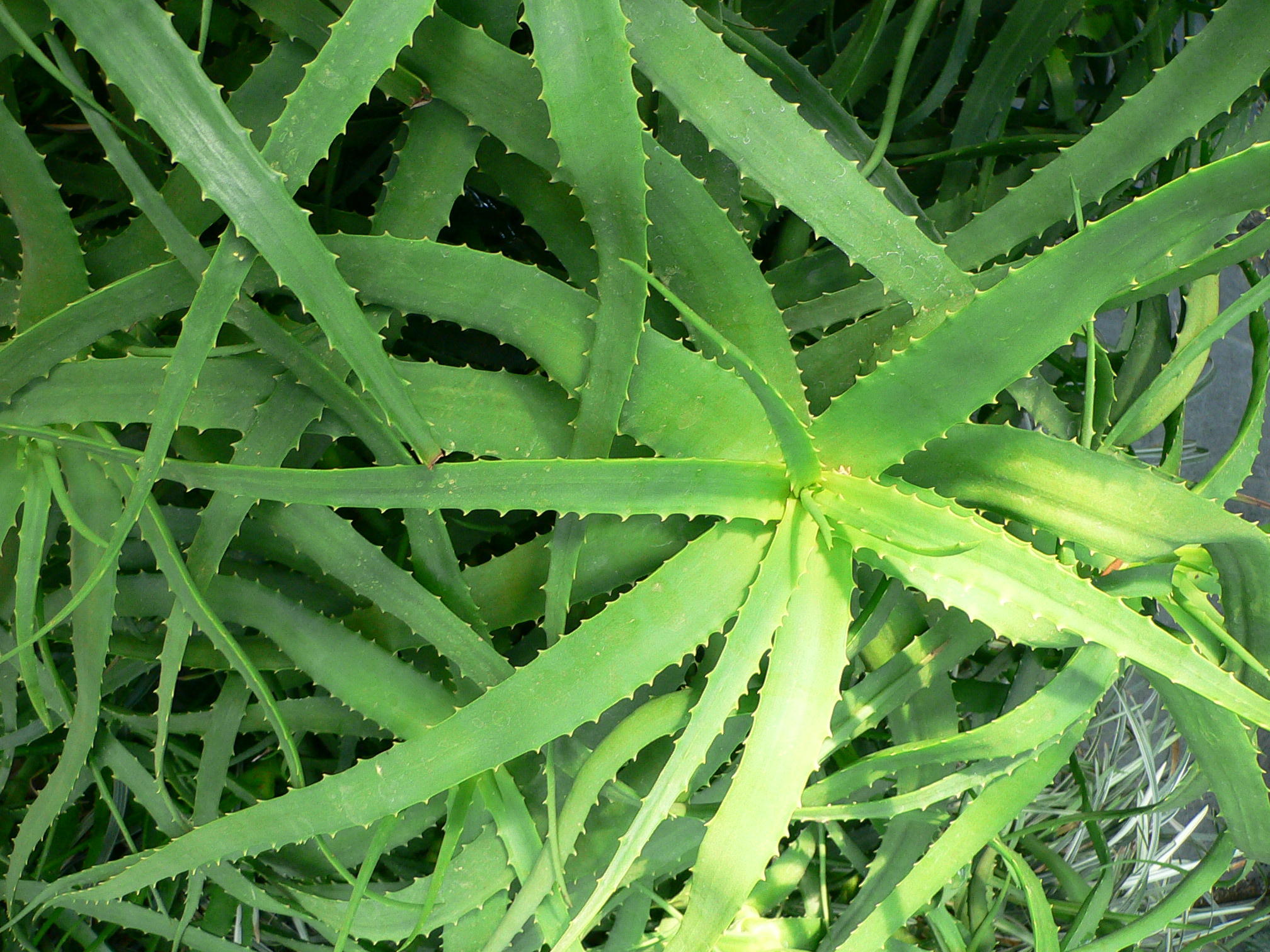

Conservation status
- Vulnerable (IUCN 2.3)

Scientific classification
- Kingdom: Plantae
- Clade: Tracheophytes
- Clade: Angiosperms
- Clade: Monocots
- Order: Asparagales
- Family: Asphodelaceae
- Subfamily: Asphodeloideae
- Genus: Aloe
- Species: A. nyeriensis

Binomial name
- Aloe nyeriensis Christian

= Aloe nyeriensis =

Species of succulent

Aloe nyeriensis is a succulent aloe plant species, endemic to Kenya.

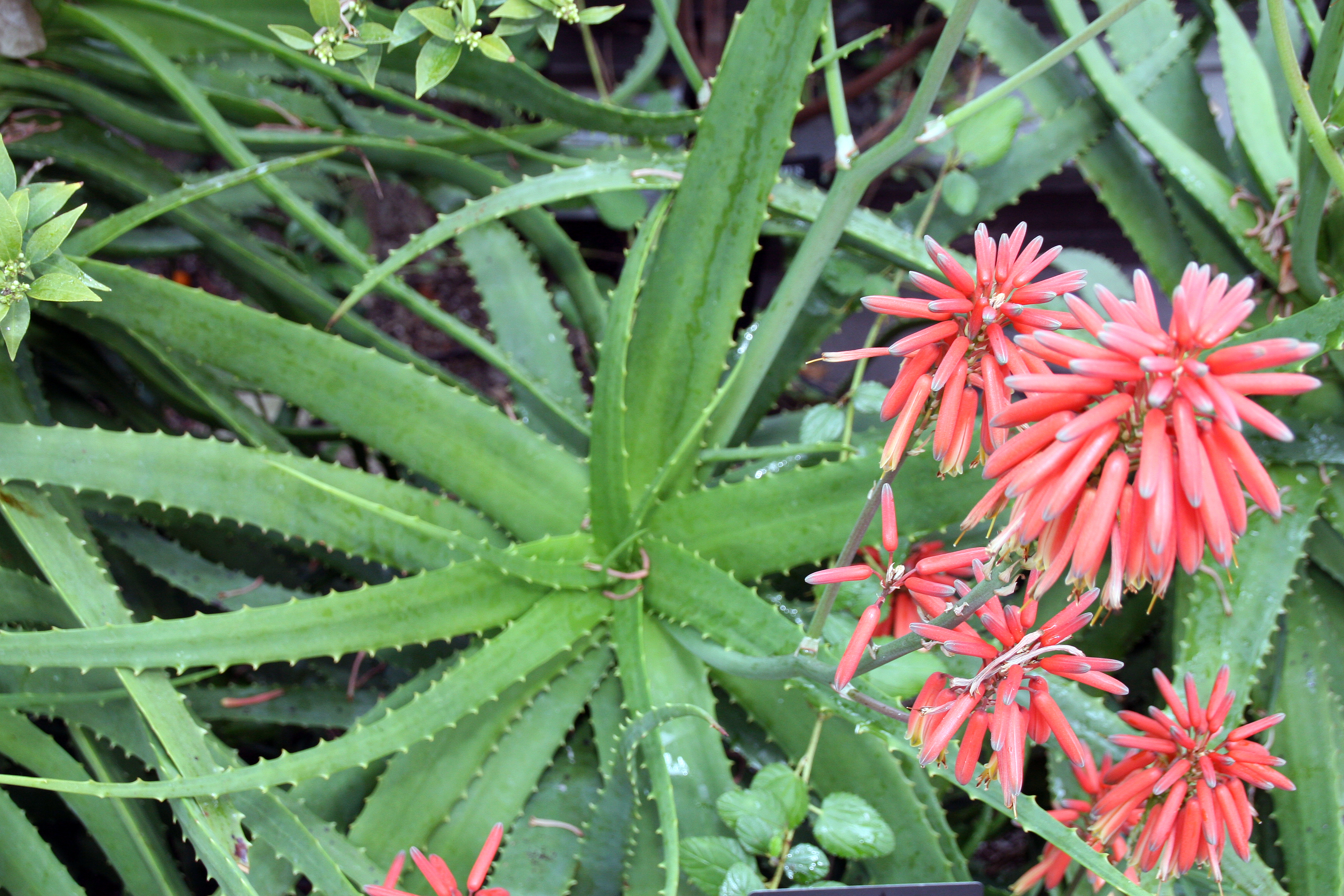
Inflorescence

It grows from 1–3 metres tall, and sends up an inflorescence on a flowering stalk from 0.5 to 0.8 metres tall, densely packed with red flowers. A. nyeriensis grows on rocky soils of the savannah, often in communities with Acacia trees, at altitudes between 1760 and 2100 metres. It is closely related to - and often confused with - its relative Aloe kedongensis. It is listed as Vulnerable on the IUCN Red List of threatened species.
