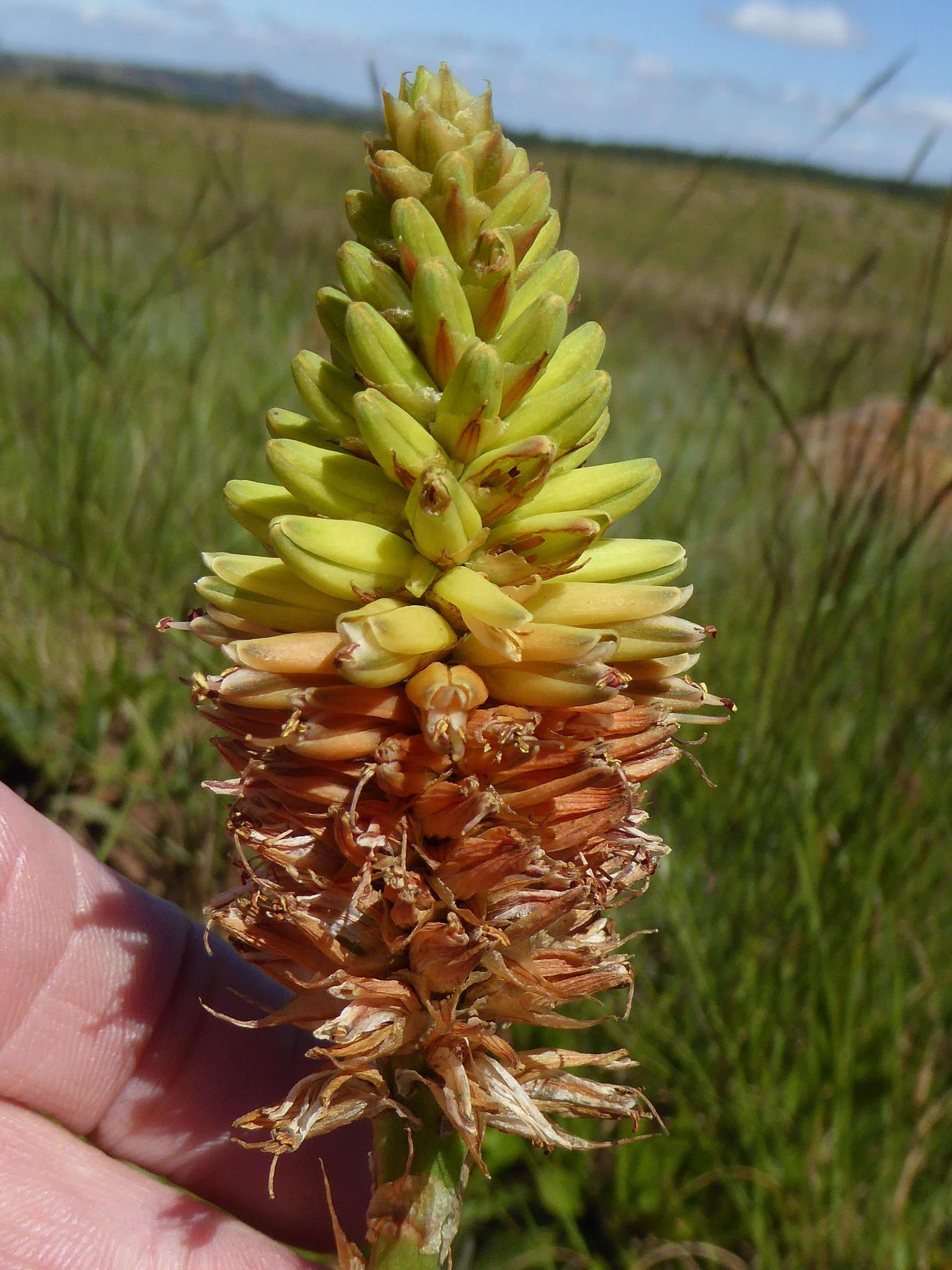

Conservation status
- CITES Appendix II (CITES)

Scientific classification
- Kingdom: Plantae
- Clade: Tracheophytes
- Clade: Angiosperms
- Clade: Monocots
- Order: Asparagales
- Family: Asphodelaceae
- Subfamily: Asphodeloideae
- Genus: Aloe
- Species: A. modesta

Binomial name
- Aloe modesta Reynolds

= Aloe modesta =

Species of succulent

Aloe modesta is a species of flowering plant in the family Asphodelaceae. This plant is rare and only known in Mpumalanga and northern KwaZulu-Natal in South Africa.
