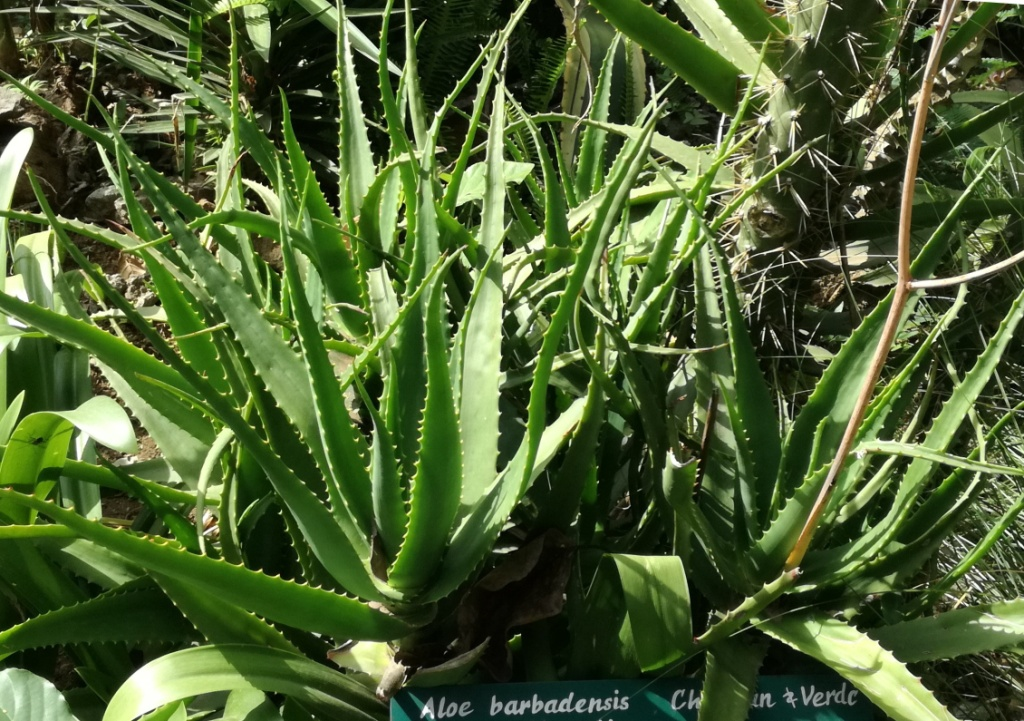

Conservation status
- Critically Endangered (IUCN 3.1)
- CITES Appendix II (CITES)

Scientific classification
- Kingdom: Plantae
- Clade: Tracheophytes
- Clade: Angiosperms
- Clade: Monocots
- Order: Asparagales
- Family: Asphodelaceae
- Subfamily: Asphodeloideae
- Tribe: Aloeae
- Genus: Aloe
- Species: A. babatiensis

Binomial name
- Aloe babatiensis Christian & I.Verd.

= Aloe babatiensis =

Species of succulent

Aloe babatiensis is an aloe which is found in northern Tanzania.

== Description ==
Aloe babatiensis branches from the base to form thick clumps of stems, each up to 2 meters long, and either erect or sprawling on the ground. The leaves are shiny, and a dull green colour without any markings. They are long, slender and recurved downwards.

The tall, erect inflorescence has up to 4 branches. The tubular flowers are bright red to pink, and 35–40 mm long.
