= Euphorbia kaokoensis =

Conservation status
- Least Concern (IUCN 3.1)

Scientific classification
- Kingdom: Plantae
- Clade: Tracheophytes
- Clade: Angiosperms
- Clade: Eudicots
- Clade: Rosids
- Order: Malpighiales
- Family: Euphorbiaceae
- Genus: Euphorbia
- Species: E. kaokoensis

Binomial name
- Euphorbia kaokoensis (A.C.White, R.A.Dyer & B.Sloane) L.C.Leach

Synonyms
- Euphorbia subsalsa var. kaokoensis A.C.White, R.A.Dyer & B.Sloane

Species of flowering plant

Euphorbia kaokoensis is a rare species of plant found in certain rocky areas of Namibia and Angola. It can appear as a woody shrub or a small tree, with green leaves that pale on undersides, which contain conspicuous veins. Males produce clusters of flowers from November to January. The species is very rare, found only at a few locations, although no threats are known.

== Description ==
Euphorbia kaokoensis varies in size and shape from a woody shrub to a small tree, at 1.5–2.5 metres (4.9–8.2 ft) tall. The leaf lamina are subcordate, lanceolate to ovate or, less commonly, elliptic. The leaf upper sides are green, while the lower sides are paler. When dried, they can appear dark green, yellow-green, blue-green, or between violet and black. On the leaves, the middle and lateral veins are very prominent, especially on the undersides. Males produce inflorescences (flower clusters) consisting of 5 to 16 flowers (in 3–7 smaller clusters), which are 6–20 millimetres (0.24–0.79 in) long, with 20–33 stamens. The stalks of the inflorescences are 1–6 millimetres (0.039–0.236 in) in length, while the stalks of individual flowers are 1.0–3.4 millimetres (0.039–0.134 in). Fruits, which are 8–10 by 4–5 millimetres (0.31 in–0.39 in × 0.16 in–0.20 in), are normally green, but dry to chestnut, dark brown, dark purple-brown or black. The seeds are spherical, with diameters of 3–4 millimetres (0.12–0.16 in) and non-sticky arils, with colouration between dull orange and vibrant orange-red. It is different in many ways from its geographically close relatives, but its stout, roughly 2 centimetres (0.79 in) thick branches are very similar to Euphorbia contorta.

== Taxonomy ==
Euphorbia kaokoensis was first recognised as Euphorbia subsalsa var. kaokoensis in 1941 by a group of botanists, including Robert Allen Dyer. In 1976, E. kaokoensis was identified as a separate species by Larry Leach. The type locality was given only as the northern Kaokoveld, in Kaokoland (modern-day Namibia). Decades later in 2014, a sterile individual was observed by botanist Wessel Swanepoel in the Otjihipa Mountains. Later that year, Swanepoel sighted another specimen, this one with flowers and fruit, in the Zebra Mountains. The second specimen was the basis of a secondary description, written by Swanepoel. He explained that the specific epithet referenced the Kaokoveld, and noted that it was likely closely related to E. trichogyne. This description was published in 2019.

== Distribution and habitat ==
Euphorbia kaokoensis has been recorded from a few sites in northwestern Namibia and one southwestern Angola. It is found on hillsides and the bases of rocky outcrops, around boulders, at elevations of 800–1,640 metres (2,620–5,380 ft). The area it is found receives 150–300 millimetres (5.9–11.8 in) of rainfall annually.

== Ecology ==
It has been observed in flower from November to January.

== Conservation ==
It is a relatively rare species overall. Swanepoel met a local Ovahimba herdsman from the area who had no knowledge of its existence. Despite its rarity, Swanepoel pointed out that it did not appear to be exploited by humans or other animals, so he recommended that the International Union for the Conservation of Nature (IUCN) classify it as vulnerable. Currently however, the organisation lists it as Least Concern, with its last assessment in 2004.
