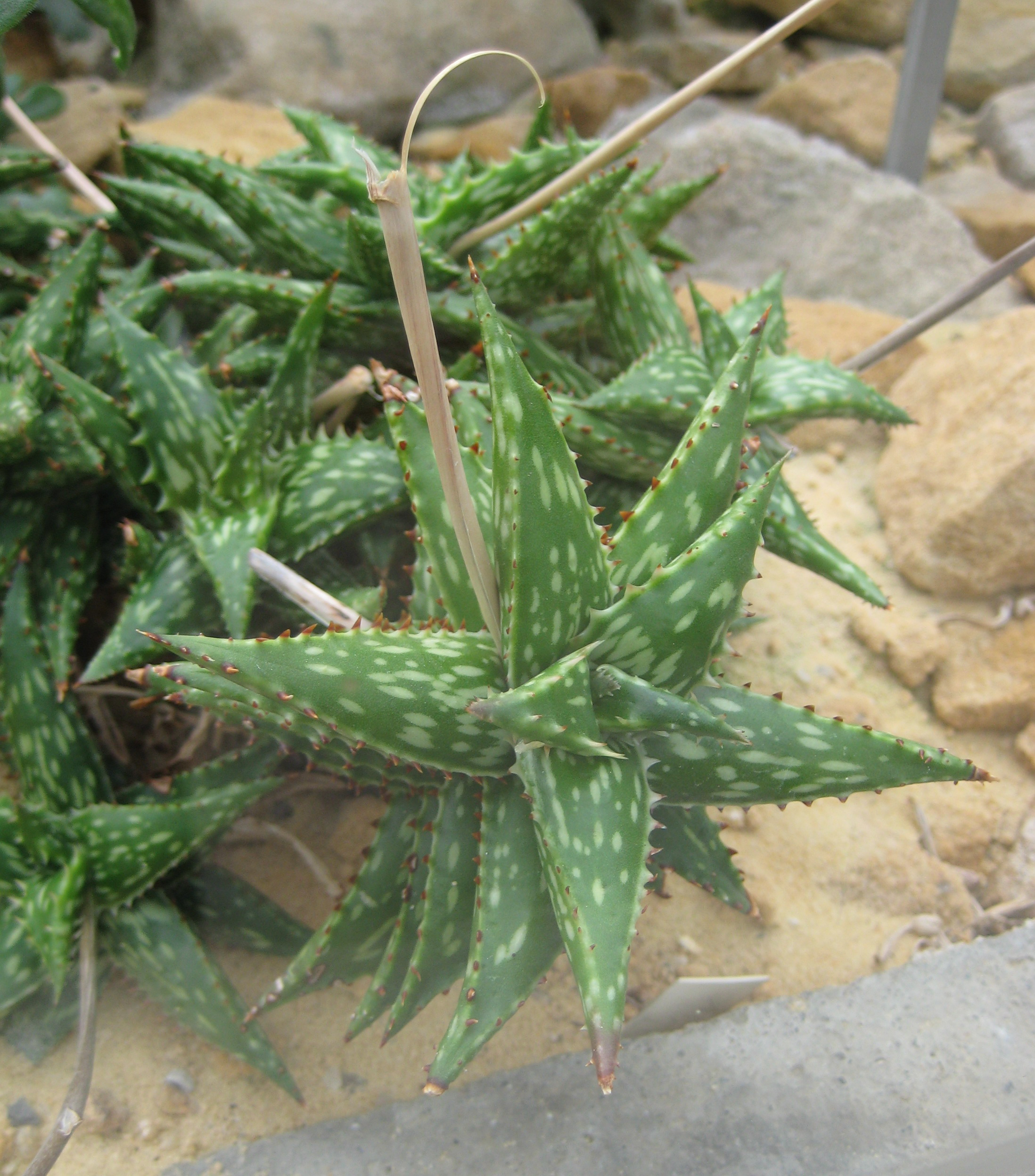

Conservation status
- Critically Endangered (IUCN 3.1)
- CITES Appendix II (CITES)

Scientific classification
- Kingdom: Plantae
- Clade: Tracheophytes
- Clade: Angiosperms
- Clade: Monocots
- Order: Asparagales
- Family: Asphodelaceae
- Subfamily: Asphodeloideae
- Genus: Aloe
- Species: A. jucunda

Binomial name
- Aloe jucunda Reynolds

= Aloe jucunda =

Species of succulent

Aloe jucunda is a species of succulent plants that belong to the family Asphodelaceae, indigenous to Somalia.

== Description ==
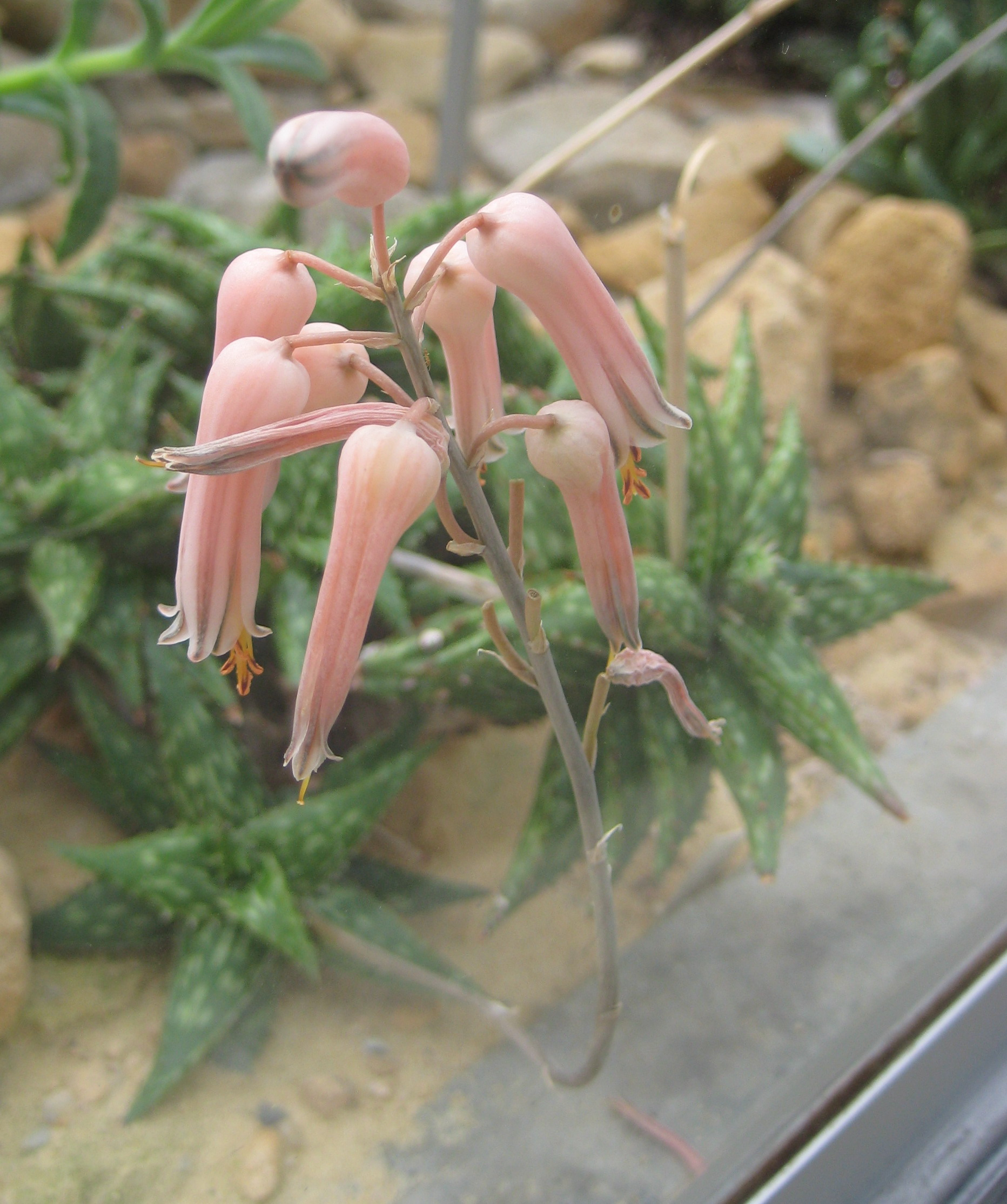
Flowers

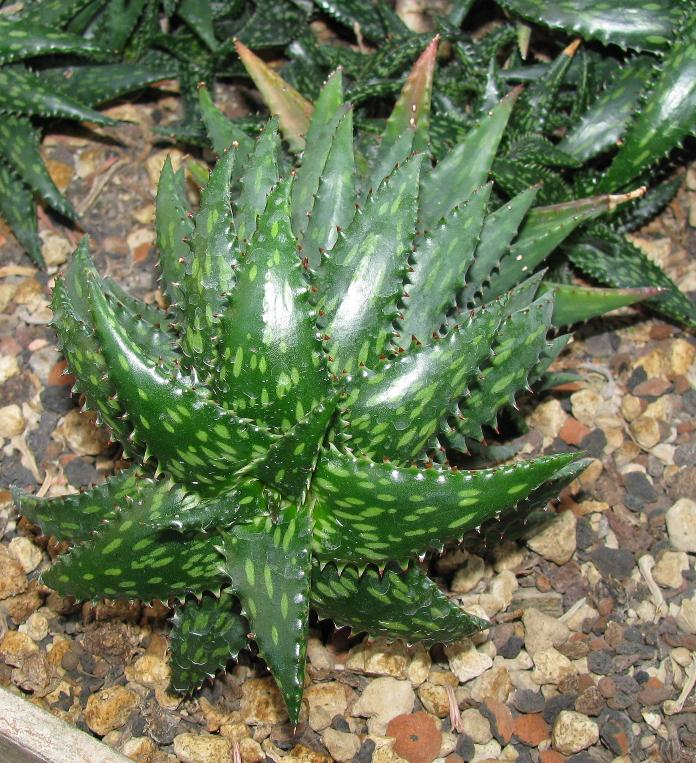
Leaves

Aloe jucunda can reach a height of about 35 cm. It has shiny, glossy, triangular, dark green leaves, usually about twelve, flecked with pale green spots, up to 4 cm long and 2–5 cm wide, with triangular teeth on the margins.

The inflorescences are single cylindrical clusters, about 35 cm high. The flowers are pale pink or coral pink, 20–30 mm.

== Distribution and habitat ==
This species is native to northern Somalia. A. jucunda occurs only in dry forests on limestone at altitudes from 1060 to 1680 meters, within a very restricted range about 30 km across the Gaan Libah plateau.

== Conservation ==
Due to its narrow range, occurrence in only three locations, and the continuing degradation of its habitat, A. jucunda is currently classified as critically endangered by the IUCN.

== Uses ==
In its native range, it is used to treat wounds, burns, and digestive problems, as well as being used as a diuretic.

In cultivation, it prefers soil with a pH of 5.5–6.5, and may be grown outside in the US in hardiness zone 11.
