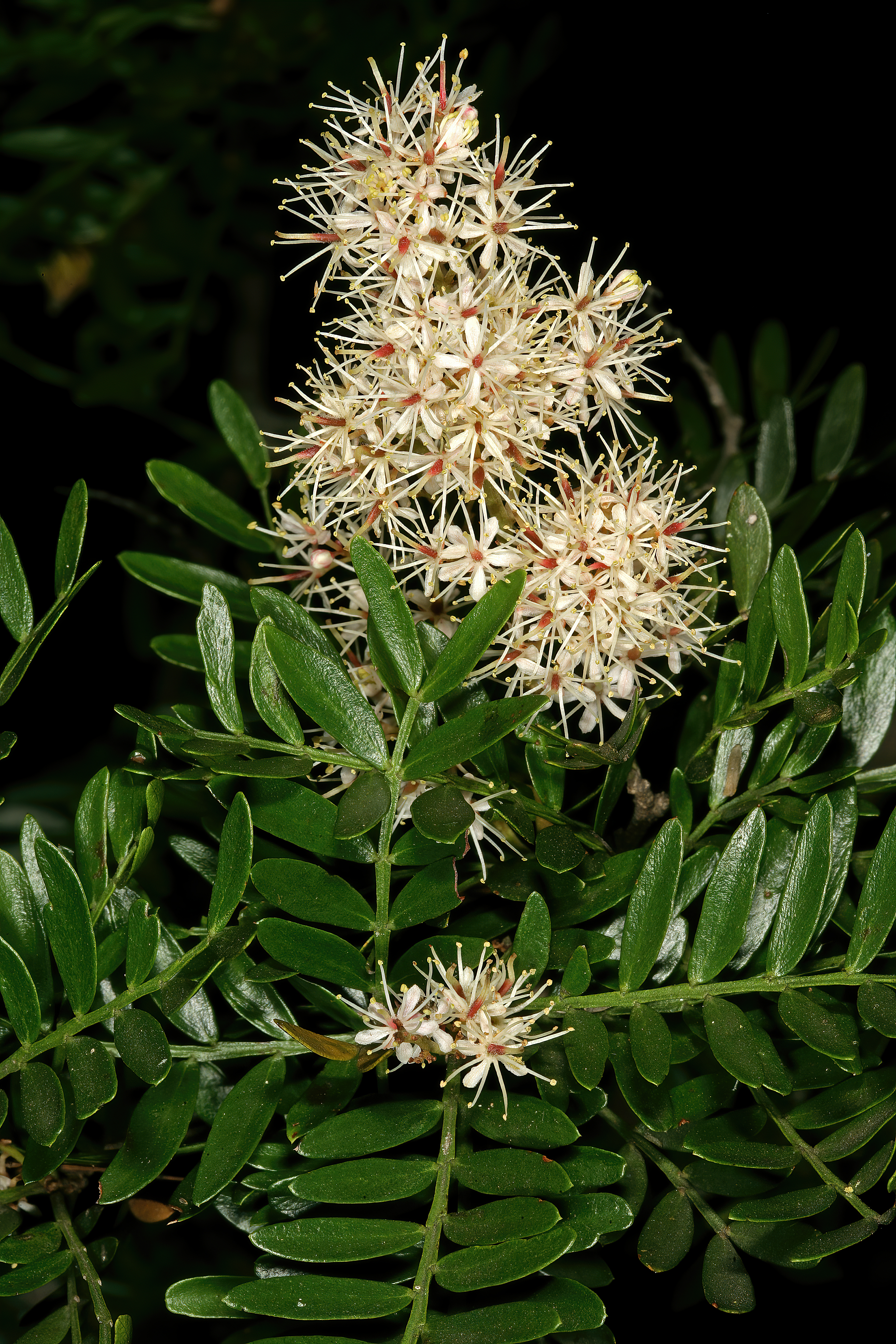
- Flowering at the Pretoria National Botanical Garden

Conservation status
- Vulnerable (IUCN 2.3)

Scientific classification
- Kingdom: Plantae
- Clade: Tracheophytes
- Clade: Angiosperms
- Clade: Eudicots
- Clade: Rosids
- Order: Fabales
- Family: Fabaceae
- Subfamily: Caesalpinioideae
- Genus: Umtiza; Sim
- Species: U. listeriana

Binomial name
- Umtiza listeriana Sim
- Range from East London to Kentani and King William's Town

= Umtiza =

Genus of legumes

Umtiza is a monotypic genus in the legume family Fabaceae containing the single species Umtiza listeriana. This tree is endemic to a small coastal portion of the Eastern Cape in South Africa.

== Distribution ==
Umtiza listeriana is found from East London to Kentani and King William's Town, with an EOO of 2,626 km^{2} (1,014 sq mi) at 6 known locations.

== Conservation ==
In 2020, an area of 1,858.48 ha (4,592.4 acres) surrounding the Umtiza Nature Reserve (one of the last refuges of Umtiza) was declared a Controlled Forest Area to further protect and rehabilitate the remaining Umtiza Forest. Umtiza listeriana is threatened by the expansion of illegal settlements near the Umtiza Forest, leading to deforestation and harvesting for traditional medicine. For these reasons SANBI has given it the conservation classification: Vulnerable B1ab(v).

== Gallery ==
Umtiza listeriana at the Pretoria National Botanical Garden

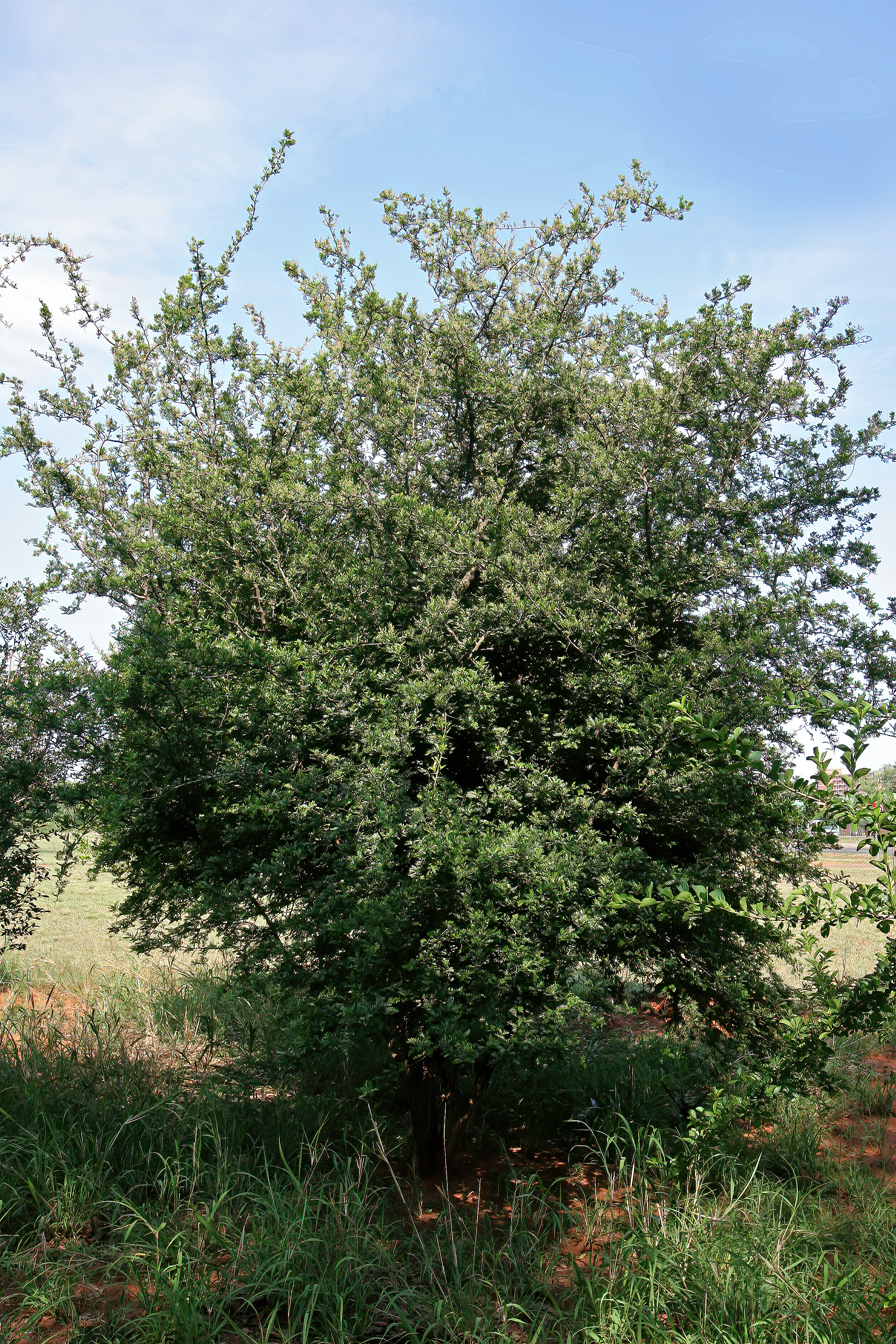
Tree

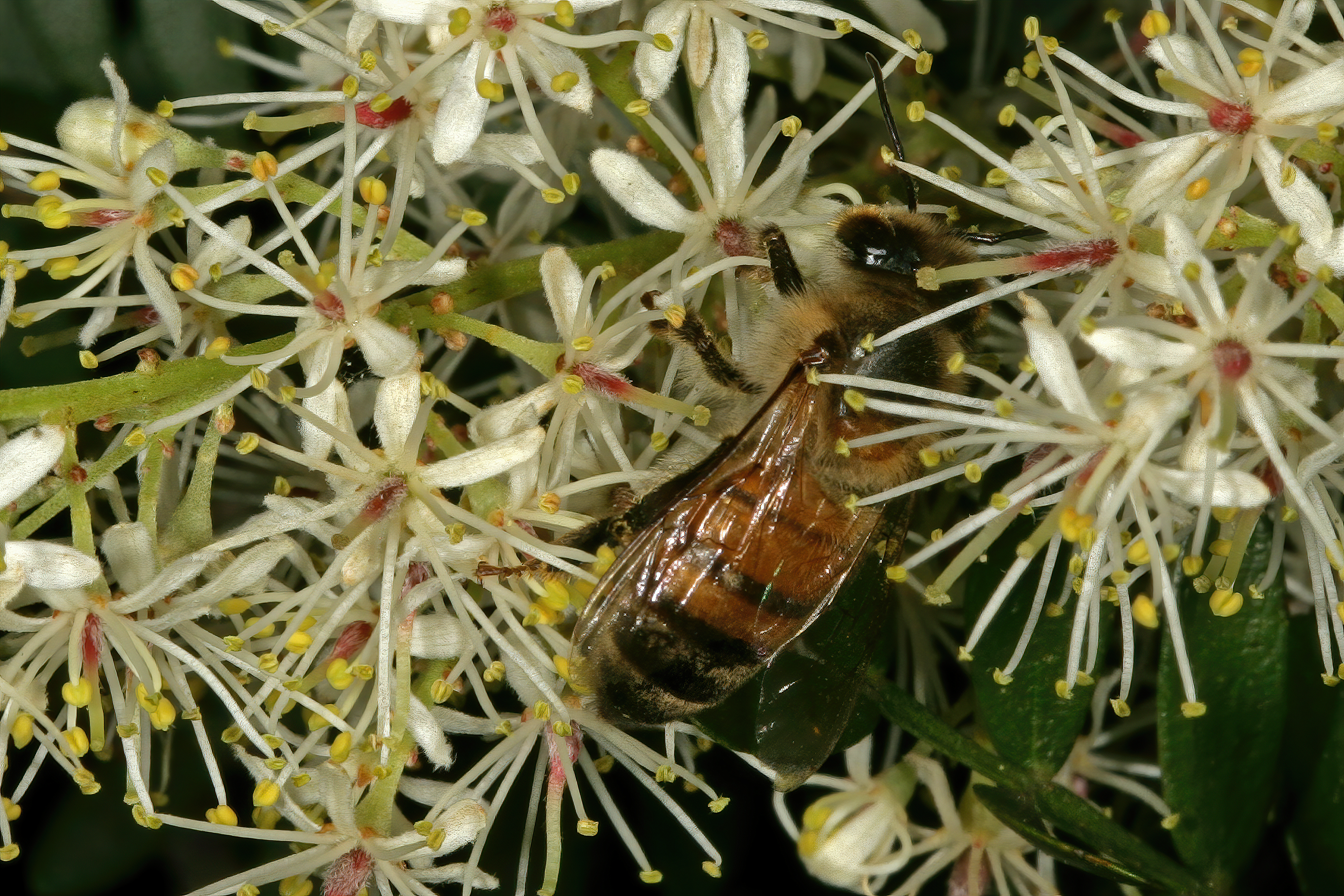
Umtiza listeriana flowers visited by an African honey bee (Apis mellifera scutellata)

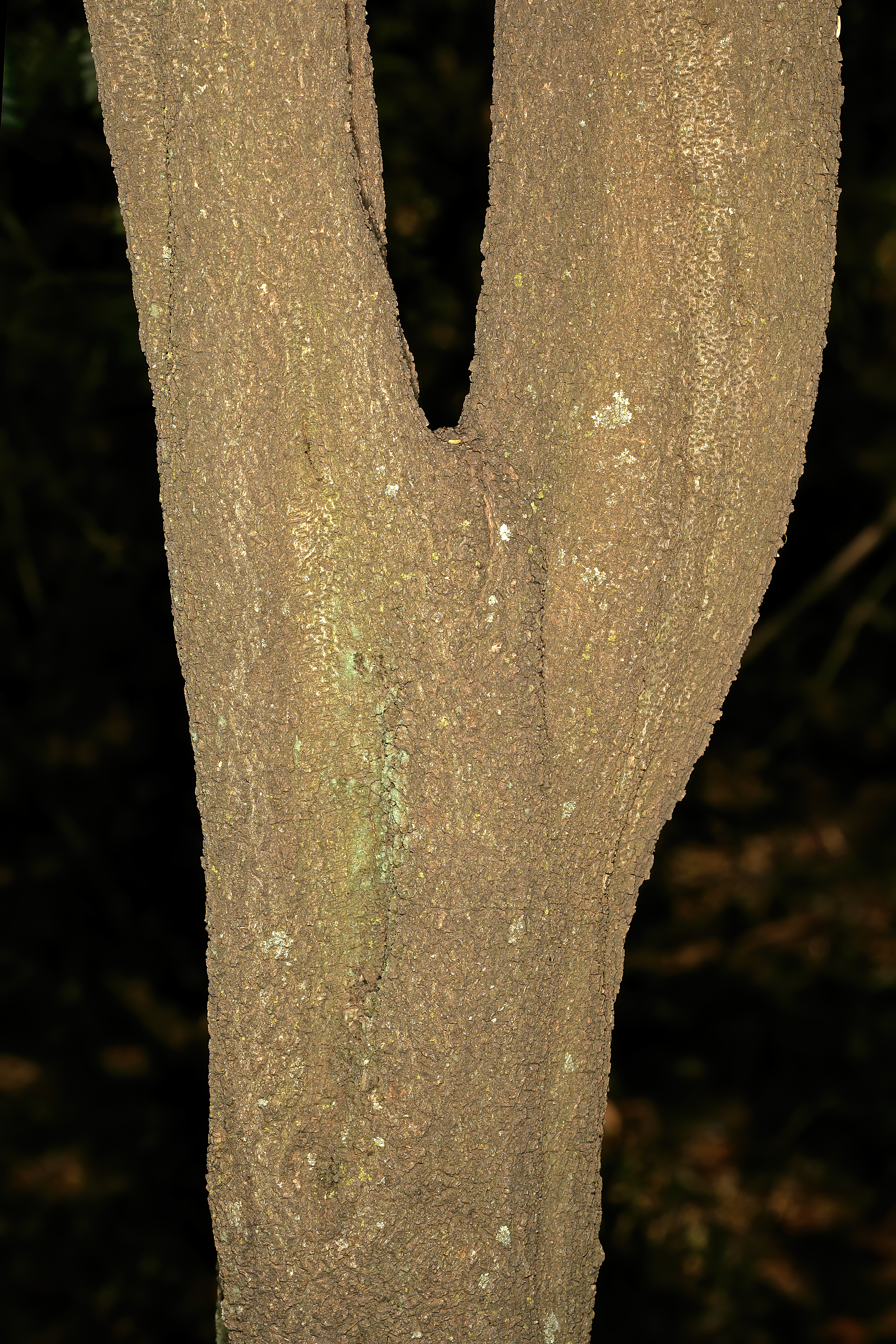
Bark

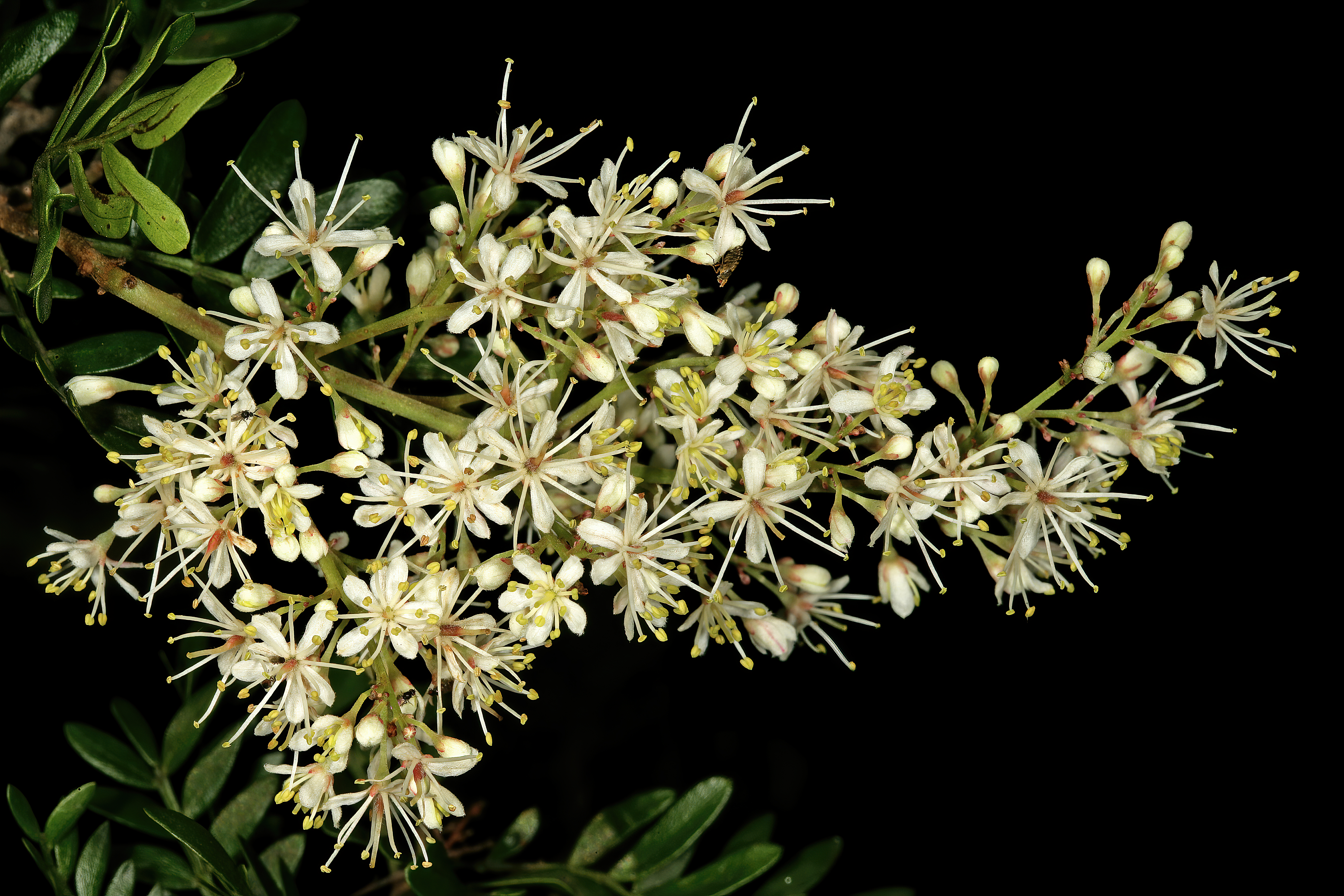

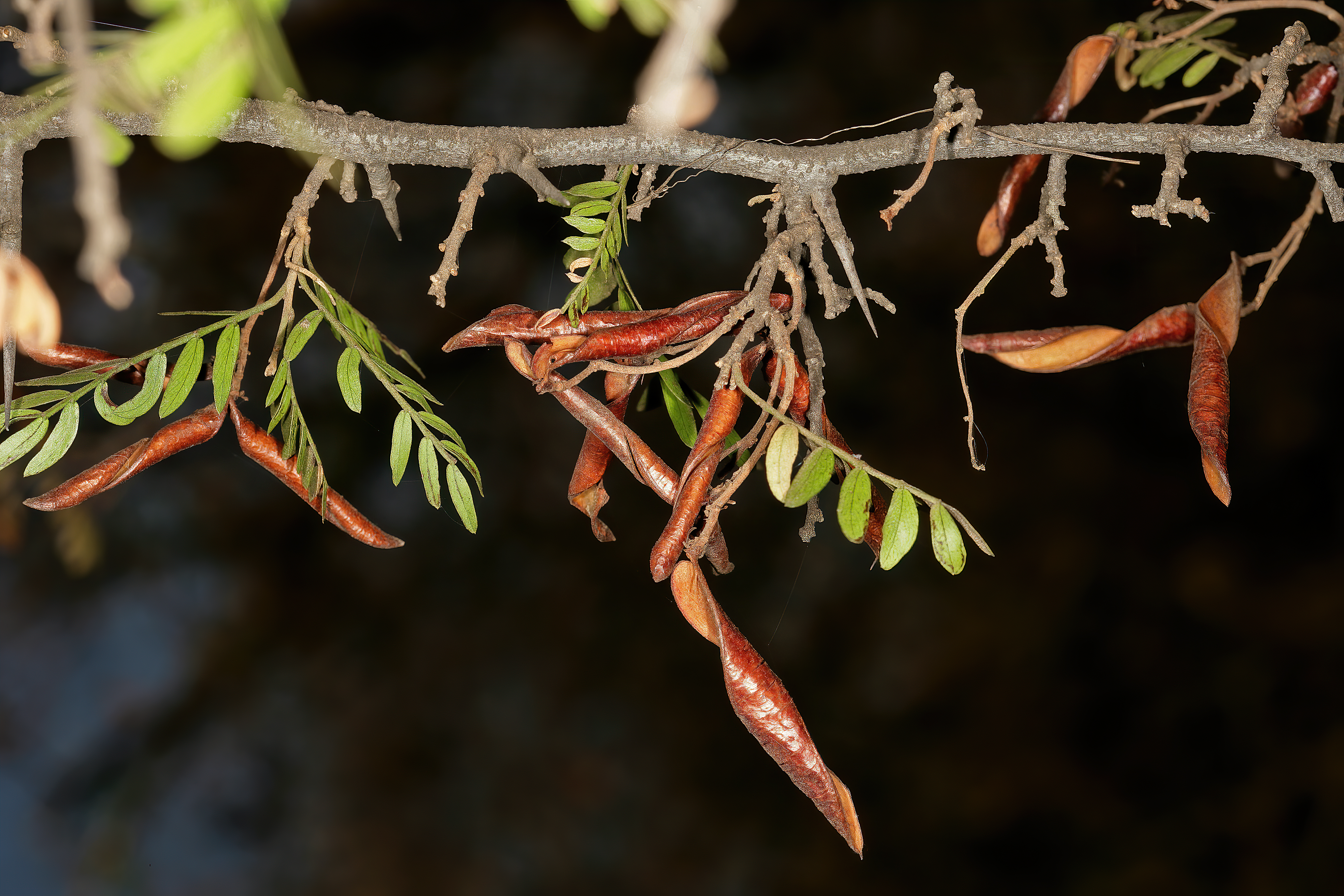
Old dehisced pods.
