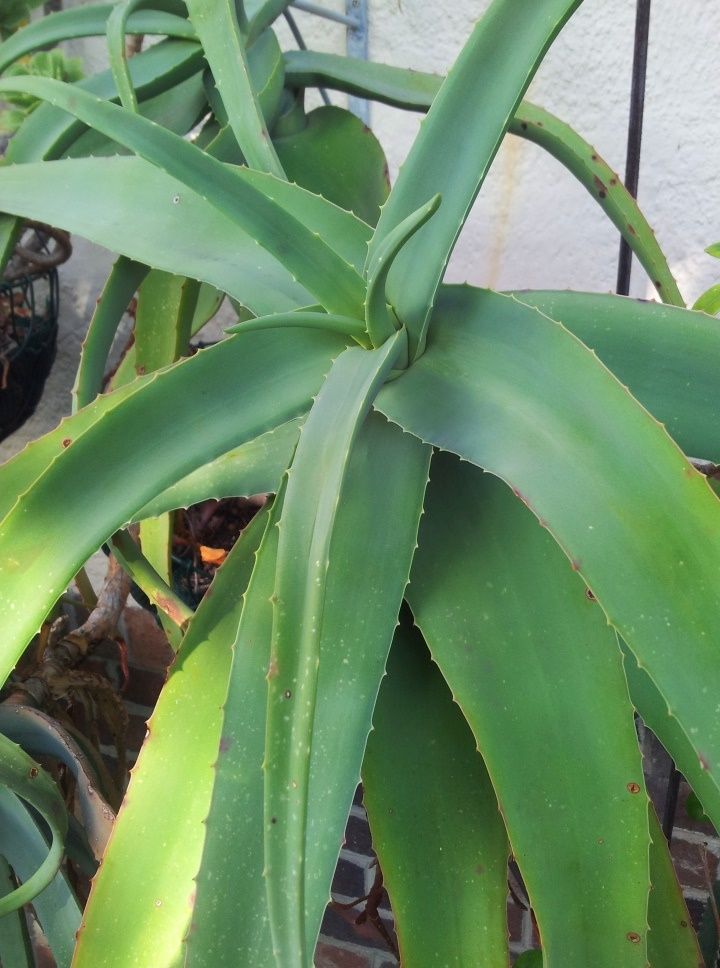

Conservation status
- Critically Endangered (IUCN 3.1)
- CITES Appendix II

Scientific classification
- Kingdom: Plantae
- Clade: Tracheophytes
- Clade: Angiosperms
- Clade: Monocots
- Order: Asparagales
- Family: Asphodelaceae
- Subfamily: Asphodeloideae
- Genus: Aloe
- Species: A. flexilifolia

Binomial name
- Aloe flexilifolia Christian

= Aloe flexilifolia =

Species of succulent

Aloe flexilifolia is a species of flowering plant in the family Asphodelaceae. It is native to the Usambara Mountains of north-eastern Tanzania.

== Description ==
Aloe flexilifolia is a perennial and a shrub. It has stems that are either sturdy and up to 1 metre (3.3 ft) in length, or are flimsy and up to 2 metres (6.6 ft) in length. These stems split off from the base, and have lanceolate leaves clumped at the top of the step. The leaves are 50 by 7 centimetres (19.7 by 2.8 in). There are teeth 1 to 2 millimetres (0.039 to 0.079 in) long that are 1 to 2 centimetres (0.39 to 0.79 in) apart. The flowers are trimerous and have pedicels 12 to 18 millimetres (0.47 to 0.71 in) in length. The flowers themselves are bright or brownish red, sometimes yellow, with a tubular shape. They are up to 3.5 centimetres (1.4 in) in length and about 8 millimetres (0.31 in) in diameter.

== Use ==
The sap from the crushed roots and leaves of A. flexilifolia is used by the Shambaa people to help reduce inflammation in the testicles and scrotum.
