= Buffalo Pass (South Africa) =

Mountain pass in South Africa

- The pass is through the Umtiza Nature Reserve and the surrounding Controlled Forest Area
- Traversed by: M5

Third Approach
- Coordinates: 33°02′07.1″S 27°47′52.3″E
- Buffalo Pass (South Africa) (South Africa)

Buffalo Pass is a mountain pass situated in the Eastern Cape, on the M5, near East London, South Africa. It traverses the entirety of the Umtiza Nature Reserve and the surrounding Controlled Forest Area.

The unique valley of Buffalo Pass is severely environmentally challenged, and a Friends of Buffalo Pass group has been formed to attempt to help protect it.
