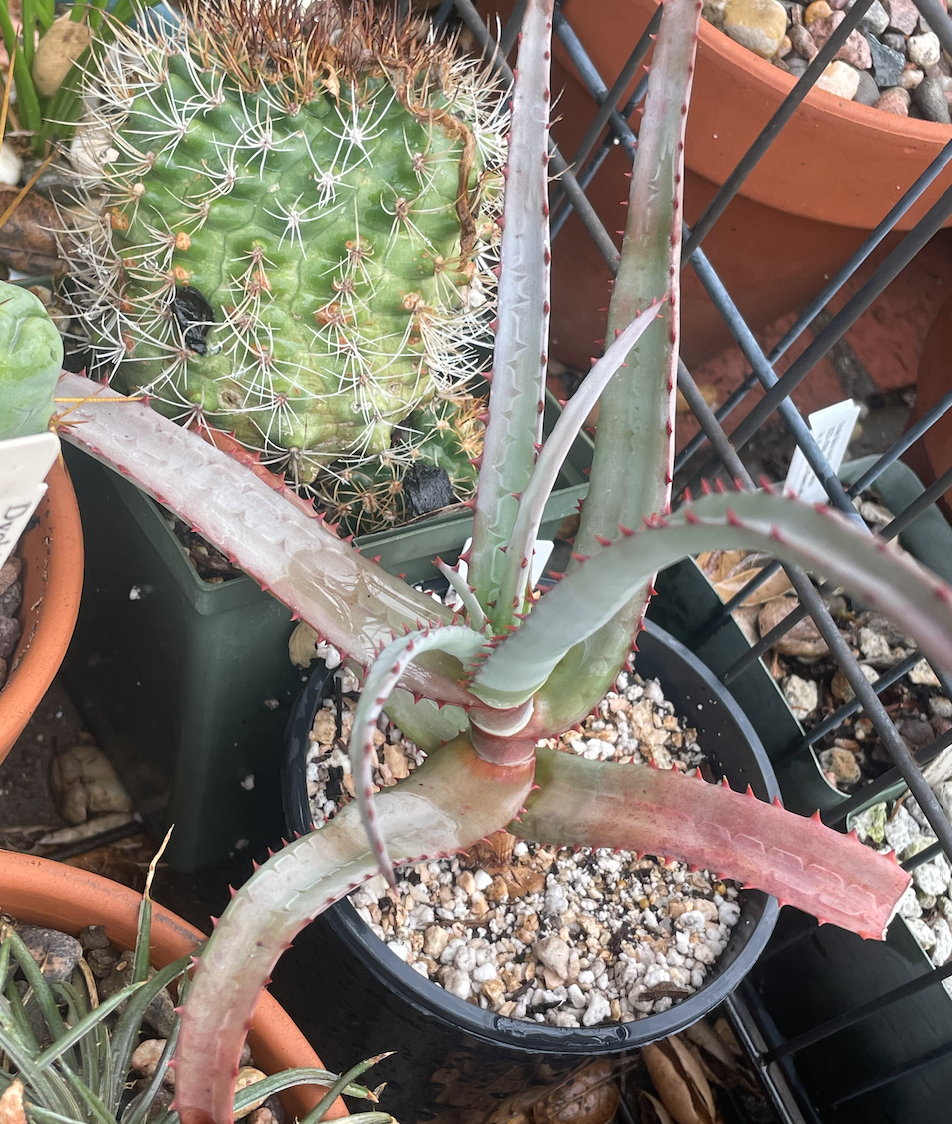
- Aloe divaricata in cultivation

Conservation status
- Least Concern (IUCN 3.1)
- CITES Appendix II

Scientific classification
- Kingdom: Plantae
- Clade: Tracheophytes
- Clade: Angiosperms
- Clade: Monocots
- Order: Asparagales
- Family: Asphodelaceae
- Subfamily: Asphodeloideae
- Genus: Aloe
- Species: A. divaricata

Binomial name
- Aloe divaricata A.Berger

Infraspecific taxa
- Aloe divaricata subsp. divaricata; Aloe divaricata subsp. tulearensis (T.A.McCoy & Lavranos) J.-P.Castillon; Aloe divaricata subsp. vaotsohy (Decorse & Poiss.) J.-P.Castillon; Aloe divaricata var. rosea (Decary) Reynolds

Synonyms
- subsp. divaricata: Aloe sahundra Bojer; subsp. tulearensis: Aloe tulearensis T.A.McCoy & Lavranos; subsp. vaotsohy: Aloe vaotsohy Decorse & Poiss.; var. rosea: Aloe vaotsohy var. rosea Decary

= Aloe divaricata =

Species of succulent plant endemic to Madagascar

Aloe divaricata is a species of succulent plant in the genus Aloe. Endemic to Madagascar, it is common and widely distributed across the island. Four infraspecific taxa are recognised: three subspecies and one variety.

== Taxonomy and history ==
Aloe divaricata was described in 1905 by German botanist Alwin Berger based on a type specimen collected from Mahajanga. The specific epithet divaricata is derived from the Latin word divaricate, meaning "spreading", in reference to the species' branched inflorescence.

Three subspecies and one variety are recognised:

- Aloe divaricata subsp. divaricata (autonym)
- Aloe divaricata subsp. tulearensis (T.A.McCoy & Lavranos) J.-P.Castillon
- Aloe divaricata subsp. vaotsohy (Decorse & Poiss.) J.-P.Castillon
- Aloe divaricata var. rosea (Decary) Reynolds

== Distribution and habitat ==
Aloe divaricata is the most widely distributed endemic Aloe of Madagascar, occurring in the former Fianarantsoa, Mahajanga, and Toliara provinces. It grows on lateritic soils in arid plains, dry spiny forests, limestone plateaus, and sandy coastal forests. It can be found from sea level up to 800 m (2,600 ft) above sea level.
