= G. W. Reynolds =

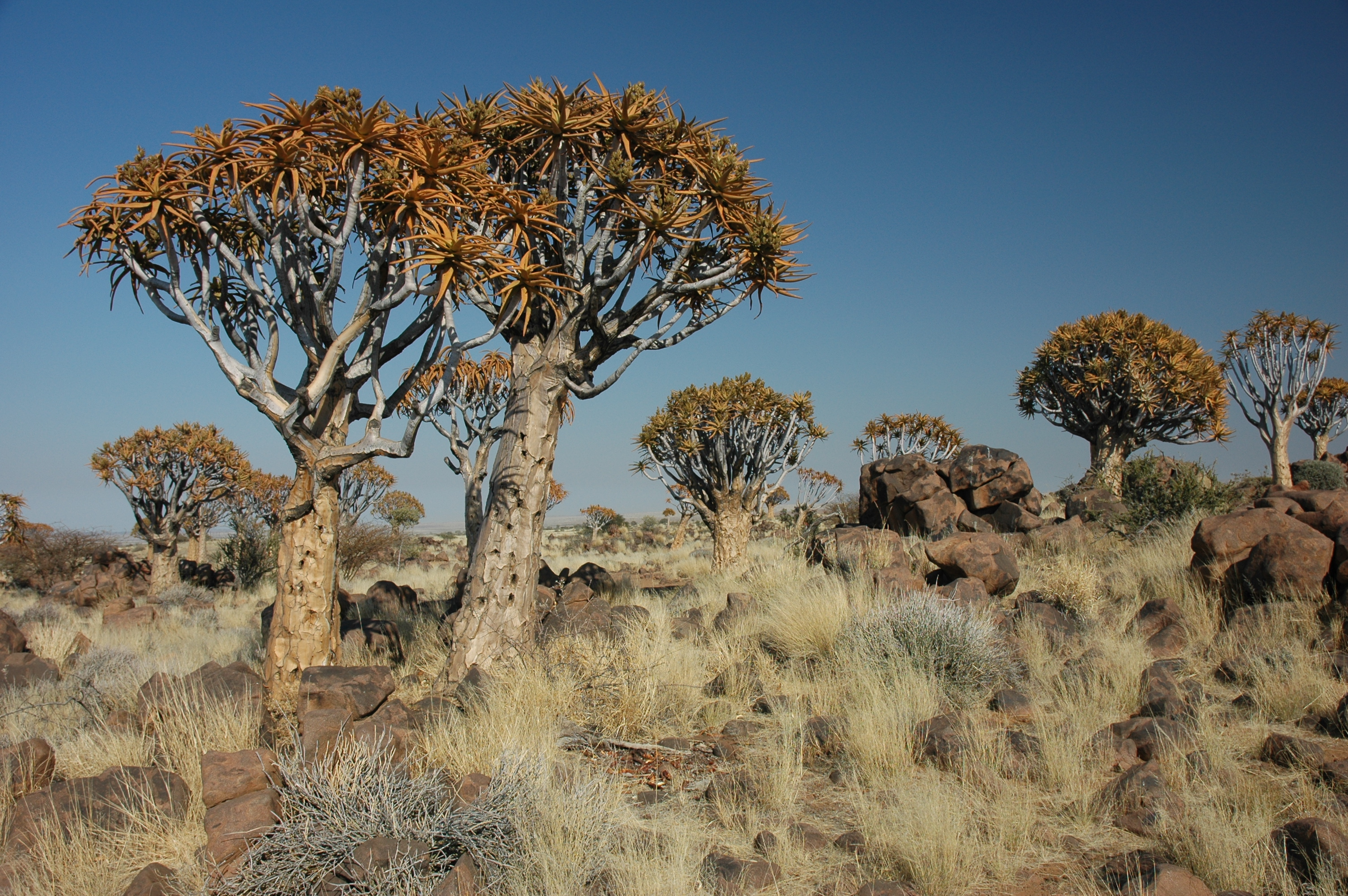
Aloidendron dichotomum (Masson) Klopper & Gideon F.Sm.

Gilbert Westacott Reynolds (10 October 1895 Bendigo – 7 April 1967 Mbabane) was a South African optometrist and authority on the genus Aloe.

Gilbert Reynolds arrived in Johannesburg with his parents in 1902, where his father started business as an optician. He received his education at St John's College where he was Victor Ludorum. After the outbreak of World War I, he enlisted and saw active service in South West Africa and Nyasaland with the rank of captain. Having qualified as optometrist he joined his father's practice in 1921. Reynolds developed a keen interest in the bulbs and succulents of South Africa at about this time. When he started his own country practice about 1930, he was able to travel extensively and gradually narrowed his interests to Aloe.

Reynolds was guided in the early stages of his research by Dr I. C. Verdoorn and Dr R. A. Dyer of the Botanical Research Institute in Pretoria, later becoming the authority on Aloe and having an extensive knowledge of the genus in the field and under cultivation. To gather material for his book, he explored the entire country, collecting specimens, gathering data and taking photographs of the plants in their natural habitats. General Smuts, himself an avid collector and experienced botanist, wrote the foreword to the book. Before the publication of Reynolds' work, no comprehensive guide to the aloes had been compiled, except for various writings and monographs which did not attempt a complete coverage. He spent four weeks at Kew towards the end of 1960, checking the taxonomy, type specimens and identifications.

== Publications ==
Published books by G.W. Reynolds:

- The Aloes of South Africa, Balkema, 1950.
- The Aloes of Nyasaland, Nyasaland Society and African Book Centre of Nyasaland, 1954.
- Les Aloes de Madagascar, Institut de Recherche scientifique de Madagascar, 1958.
- The Aloes of Tropical Africa and Madagascar, Aloes Book Fund, 1966.

== Publications ==
- Aloe broomii var. tarkaensis Reynolds, J. S. African Bot. 2: 72 (1936).
- Aloe bulbillifera var. paulianae Reynolds, J. S. African Bot. 22: 261 (1956).
- Aloe cameronii var. dedzana Reynolds, J. S. African Bot. 31(2): 167 (1965).
- Aloe comptonii Reynolds, Aloes S. Africa 382 (1950).
- Aloe divaricata var. rosea (Decary) Reynolds, Naturaliste Malgache 10: 133 (1958).
- Aloe gracilis var. decumbens Reynolds, Aloes S. Africa 358 (1950).
- Aloe howmanii Reynolds, Kirkia 1: 156 (1961).
- Aloe lineata var. muirii (Marloth) Reynolds, Aloes S. Africa 205 (1950).
- Aloe saponaria var. ficksburgensis Reynolds, J. S. African Bot. 3: 148 (1937).
- Aloe schweinfurthii var. labworana Reynolds, J. S. African Bot. 22(3): 140 (1956).
- Aloe somaliensis var. marmota Reynolds & P.R.O.Bally, J. S. African Bot. 30: 222 (1964).
- Aloe striatula var. caesia Reynolds, Fl. Pl. South Africa 16: t. 633 (1936).
- Aloe wickensii var. lutea Reynolds, J. S. African Bot. 3: 145 (1965).
- Notes on the Aloes of southern Ethiopia and Somalia, in Journal of The East Africa Natural History Society, Naibrobi, 1954, Pages 102–104. (online)
- Hunting aloes in East Africa, African Wild Life 6: 308-322 (1952)
- Hunting aloes in Nyasaland, African Wild Life 7: 102-111 (1953)
- Hunting aloes in Ethiopia and Somaliland, African Wild Life 8: 14-25 (1954)
- The Murchison Falls National Park, African Wild Life 8: 271-279 (1954)
- The Queen Elizabeth National Park, African Wild Life 9: 109-114 (1955)
- Hunting aloes in Madagascar, African Wild Life 9: 299-320 (1955)
- Hunting aloes in Eritrea and Ethiopia, African Wild Life 10: 205-214 (1956)
- Hunting aloes in Somaliland Protectorate, African Wild Life 12: 101-114 (1958)
- Hunting aloes in Nyasaland and Tanganyika Territory, African Wild Life 13: 35-52 (1959)
- Hunting aloes in Angola, African Wild Life 14: 13-25 (1960)

He published numerous popular articles in African Wild Life detailing his collecting trips to places as far afield as Somaliland, Eritrea, Ethiopia and Madagascar, as well as many scientific papers in botanical journals on the subject of aloes. After his death, his collection of aloes was transplanted to the Mlilwane Game Sanctuary in Swaziland, with quite a number going to the National Botanical Institute in Pretoria.

== Awards and fellowships ==
- Fellow of the Cactus and Succulent Society of America (CSSA), 1941
- Fellow of the Linnean Society of London (F.L.S), 1951
- Merit of the Southern Africa Association for the Advancement of Science, 1951
- Honorary doctorate of the University of Cape Town, 1952
- Bolus–Medal of the Botanical Society of South Africa, 1966
