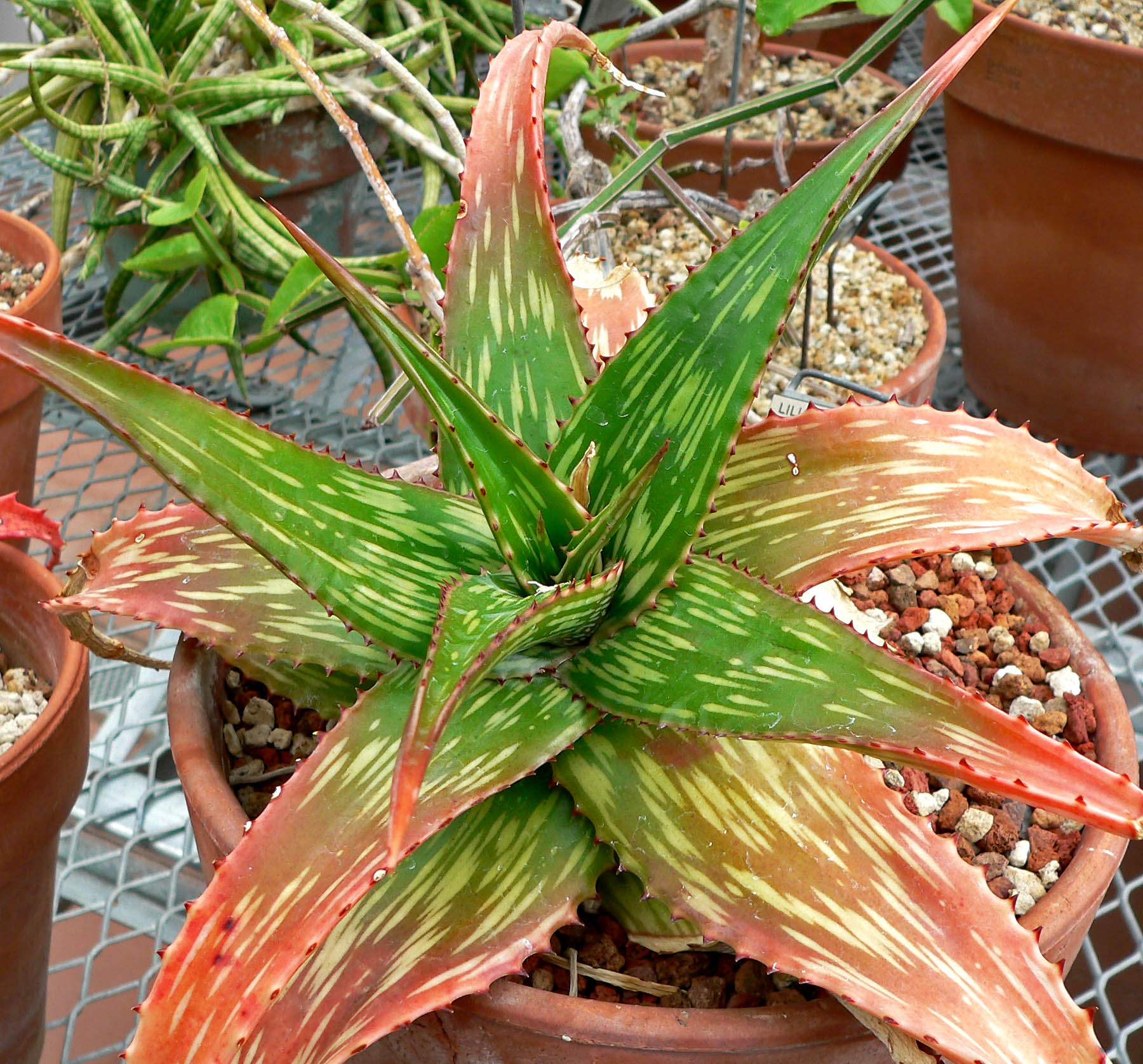
- A. somaliensis, University of California Botanical Garden (Shebs 2006)

Conservation status
- Vulnerable (IUCN 3.1)
- CITES Appendix II (CITES)

Scientific classification
- Kingdom: Plantae
- Clade: Tracheophytes
- Clade: Angiosperms
- Clade: Monocots
- Order: Asparagales
- Family: Asphodelaceae
- Subfamily: Asphodeloideae
- Genus: Aloe
- Species: A. somaliensis

Binomial name
- Aloe somaliensis C.H.Wright ex W.Watson

= Aloe somaliensis =

Species of succulent

Aloe somaliensis, the Somali aloe, is a species of flowering plant in the family Asphodelaceae. It is an evergreen succulent perennial native to Somalia, Somaliland, and Djibouti in East Africa, where it grows at altitudes of 700–1,700 metres (2,300–5,600 ft) in bushland on limestone and sandstone rocks.

This plant forms a rosette of broad leaves with striking variable zigzag markings, pink or brown spines, and pink or red flowers to 60 cm in late summer.

In temperate regions it can be grown outside in a sheltered, sunny spot, but requires the protection of glass in the winter. It has gained the Royal Horticultural Society's Award of Garden Merit.
