= Harold Basil Christian =

South African-born Rhodesian farmer, horticulturist, and botanist

President of the Rhodesian Agricultural Union
- In office 1929–1931
- Preceded by: S. M. Lanigan O'Keefe
- Succeeded by: G. N. Fleming

Personal details
- Born: 28 October 1871 Port Elizabeth, Cape Colony
- Died: 12 May 1950 (aged 78) Salisbury, Southern Rhodesia
- Spouse: Annabella Kemp Saint (m. 1920; sep. 1923)
- Parent: Henry Bailey Christian
- Occupation: Farmer; horticulturist; botanist

Military service
- Allegiance: United Kingdom
- Branch/service: British Army
- Years of service: 1899–1902
- Unit: Imperial Light Horse
- Battles/wars: Second Boer War

Harold Basil Christian (28 October 1871 – 12 May 1950) was a Cape Colony-born Rhodesian farmer, horticulturist, and botanist. Christian attended Eton College in the United Kingdom, where he was a distinguished athlete. He served in the Imperial Light Horse of the British Army during the Second Boer War, during which he fought in the Siege of Ladysmith. In the decade after the war, he worked in what is now South Africa for De Beers and later as an engineer for a mining company. In 1911, Christian moved to Rhodesia (today Zimbabwe). There, he purchased a sizable farm, which he named Ewanrigg. He was best known for his study and cultivation of aloe on his extensive estate, which was donated to the state upon his death and became a national park.

Christian initially attempted to grow imported European plants on his farm, but these tree species, which tend to be conifers, were not well-suited to the region's heat, dryness, and low altitude. In 1916, after it proved impossible to remove an unsightly rock from a spacious lawn in front of the house, Christian took an Aloe cameronii from a nearby hill and planted it in front of the stone. He was very impressed when the aloe flowered the next year despite not having been watered, and decided to focus thereafter on aloes rather than imported trees. During the 1930s, he expanded his garden and publishing his research on aloes in periodicals like the Rhodesian Agricultural Journal. Over the years, he became recognized by botanists around the world as an authority on African aloe species. One species was named Aloe christianii in his honor. In his later years, Christian focused on the cultivation of cycads as well.

== Early life, family, and education ==
Harold Basil Christian was born on 28 October 1871 in Port Elizabeth, Cape Colony (today South Africa). His father Henry Bailey Christian, was prominent in the city's agriculture, trade, and politics. Christian's grandfather, Ewan Christian, arrived at the Cape of Good Hope on his uncle Admiral Hugh Cloberry Christian's ship. His family was of Manx, English, and Welsh descent.

Christian's paternal ancestors were descended from the Cumberland family of deemsters, or judges, on the Isle of Man. One of his notable ancestors was Fletcher Christian, a participant in the mutiny on the Bounty. Fletcher was one of the mutineers who in 1790, settled on Pitcairn Island and established an isolated community. Christian's father, Henry Bailey Christian, a veteran of the 1846 Xhosas War, was a successful farmer and merchant and a prominent public figure.

Christian grew up Kragga Kama, the family farm, located 12 miles outside Port Elizabeth. He had three older brothers and four sisters. He studied at Eton College in the United Kingdom. There, he was a skilled athlete. The Eton College Chronicle in 1887 and 1888 reports his success in Association football (soccer), sculling, and rowing. In South Africa, he was an award-winning equestrian, an activity he shared with his father, who owned racehorses.

== Military service and early career ==
=== Second Boer War ===
After graduating from Eton, Christian returned to South Africa and served in the British Army in the Second Boer War. He served in the Imperial Light Horse and was the second to ride into battle at the Siege of Ladysmith. He later carried an injured comrade through heavy gunfire for 1.5 miles at the Battle of the Tugela Heights.

=== Work in mining ===
After the war until around 1910, Christian worked for De Beers in Kimberley, and later as an engineer for a mining company in the Witwatersrand. During this period, he met Cecil Rhodes while working in Kimberley. Christian said that on Rhodes' instruction, he became the first man to write "Rhodesia" on a map. An article in the journal Rhodesiana wrote that this story is "reasonably possible", as the British South Africa Company had used the term "Rhodesia" since 1895.

== Life in Rhodesia ==
=== Farming, discovery of aloes, and marriage ===
While working in the Northern Cape during his career in the mining business, Christian likely heard much about the colony of Rhodesia to the north. Christian emigrated to Rhodesia in 1911. Three years later, he purchased Mount Shannon Farm from Gerald Ernest George Fitzgibbon. The farm was located about 40 kilometers northeast of Salisbury (now Harare), in what today is Mashonaland East Province. He paid £5,000 for the 662-morgen farm, and renamed it Ewanrigg, after an old family property in the Isle of Man.

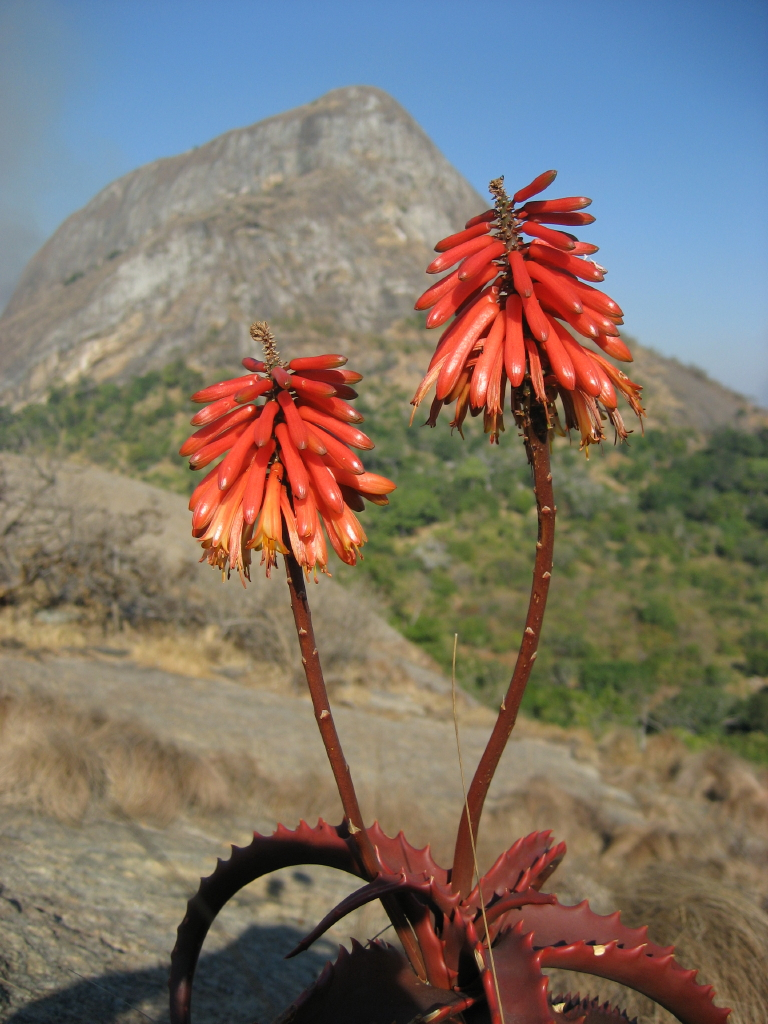
A flowering Aloe cameronii, the first aloe Christian planted in his garden.

After purchasing his farm, Christian constructed a house on a kopje and added a croquet lawn in front. He constructed a water garden, including a waterfall, which was popular with visitors. While the water feature appeared to flow continuously with a pump, in reality, water was brought up from a nearby stream in an ox-drawn cart and poured into a tank behind the waterfall, and the tap was opened just before visitors arrived. Spacious lawns were cleared in front of the house where Christian planned to develop a garden. He originally planted imported European alpines, inspired by the designs of the English gardeners he knew growing up on his father's farm in South Africa. However, the imported plants, which thrive in high altitudes, cooler temperatures, and generous amounts of water, were not suited to the hot, dry climate of Southern Africa.

In the center of the lawn, a large rock protruded above the ground and was unable to be removed despite much digging. In 1916, Christian's farm surveyor went to a hill close by, uprooted an Aloe cameronii, and planted it "to hide the stark appearance of this unsightly rock". When the plant flowered the next year despite no watering, Christian was so pleased that he decided to focus on gardening native African aloes instead of imported plants. From 1916 on, numerous rockeries were constructed and more and more aloes were acquired for the garden.

On 18 December 1920, Christian married Annabella Roberta Kemp Saint, a Scottish woman. Their marriage was held at the Cathedral of St Mary and All Saints in Salisbury, and was solemnized by Bishop William Carter of the Anglican Diocese of Cape Town. They had a short, difficult marriage, and in September 1923, they signed a separation agreement. She moved back to Scotland and died in 1955.

In addition to gardening, which began as a hobby, Christian was an active farmer and leading figure in the Rhodesian agriculture community. He was involved in starting a maize-growing competition in Mashonaland in which farmers competed to grow the most maize on one acre. He was often chosen to judge maize competitions. He was also instrumental in encouraging Rhodesian farmers to use fertilizer and better irrigation. He served as President of the Rhodesian Agricultural Union (today the Commercial Farmers' Union) from 1929 to 1931.

=== Cultivation and study of aloe ===
By the 1920s, Christian spent increasing amounts of time focusing on his garden. In the 1930s, he began traveling throughout Rhodesia and South Africa, searching for new varieties of aloe for his garden. He diligently collected, identified, cultivated, studied, and photographed different species, and published his research. In 1937, he journeyed throughout eastern Rhodesia, and the following year, he traveled to Nyasaland (today Malawi) to study the aloes there. From 1933 to 1952, he published articles and papers in various periodicals, and several were published posthumously. In 1933, he published his first article, "Notes on African Aloes," in the Rhodesian Agricultural Journal. In it, he advocated for the use of aloes as decorative plants due to their perennial nature, and requirement of little water.

Christian, and Gilbert W. Reynolds, South African optometrist, were the two foremost aloe enthusiasts at the time. Reynolds' study of aloe began in 1930, and in 1933, a friend in Port Elizabeth arranged for them to meet. They met for breakfast at the King Edward Hotel in Port Elizabeth, where they were both so engaged that neither man touched his food. The outcome of that first meeting was that the two decided that Christian would focus on aloes growing above the Limpopo River, while Reynolds would concentrate on aloes occurring south of the river.

In 1937 his right arm was amputated above the elbow, a consequence of a modest injury that did not heal properly. His disability forced him to give up other hobbies and focus almost entirely on gardening. In addition to aloes, he also had an interest in Barberton daisies. For the next decade and half, Christian spent much time preparing a book on tropical African aloe species. He filled several large leather-bound notebooks and plant registers with the fruits of his studies, but the idea of a book ultimately did not come about.

In mid-1939, Gilbert Reynolds visited Ewanrigg Farm. He published a detail description of his visit in the South African Horticultural Journal, in which he noted the rockeries, pools, and the prevalence of Aloe cameronii, which were in bloom at the time of his visit. He called the gardens "the finest and most complete collection of Aloes in existence".

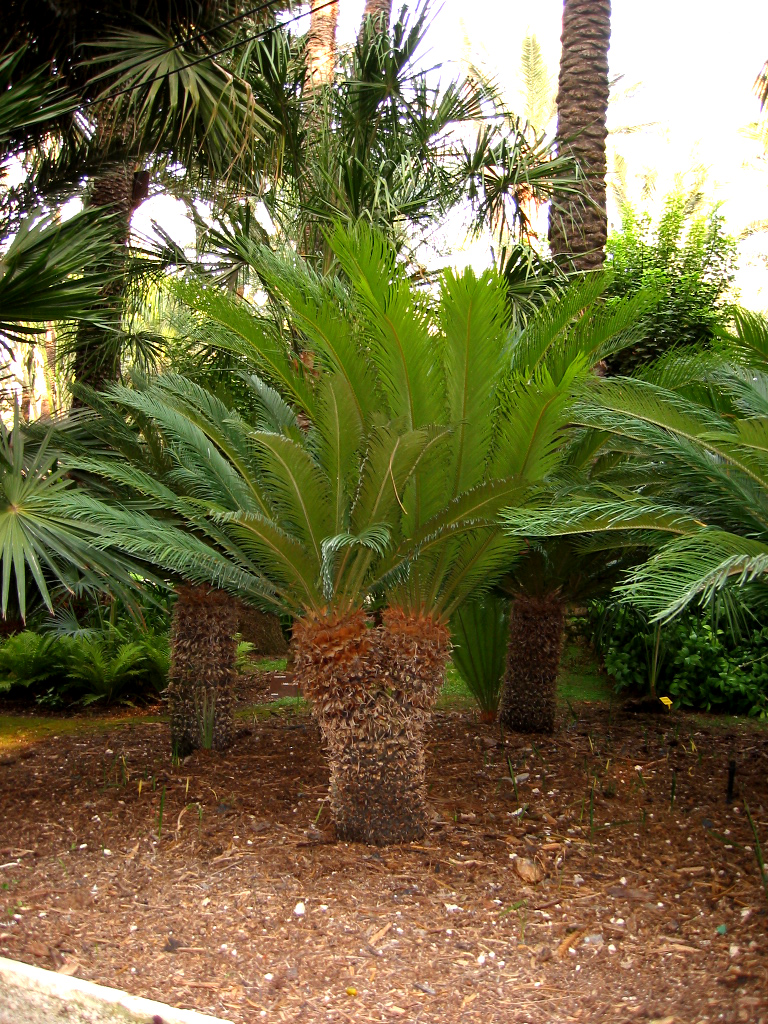
A cycas plant, part of the cycad division of plants that Christian studied later in his life.

Christian's growing reputation as an expert on the aloe genus, as well as requests to botanists at Kew Gardens in London and the South African Division of Botany in Pretoria, meant that crates and packages of aloes arrived at Ewanrigg with frequency. Upon arrival, they aloes were recorded and planted, and when they bloomed, their flowers were described and the descriptions were published. With the help of Inez Clare Verdoorn, they recorded 28 previously unidentified species. By the early 1940s, the gardens had been expanded to seven acres, and had earned an international reputation. Christian was by now seen as a top expert on aloe and on African aloes in particular. Governors of Southern Rhodesia were often invited to visit. The Minister of Internal Affairs declared the garden national monument in 1943.

During his later years, Christian continued to cultivate aloes but also began collecting and propagating cycads and other genera. He developed an extensive collection of African cycads, and nearly all species of the genus Encephalartos could be found at Ewanrigg. In 1947, he went on a thorough cycad tour of South Africa with Inez Clare Verdoorn and others, where they traveled from the Transvaal through Natal and examined all known localities of encephalartos. In addition to cycads, he was interested in euphorbia. In the 1941 book Succulent Euphorbieae of Southern Africa, Christian is listed in the acknowledgements, and several of his photographs were used in the book.

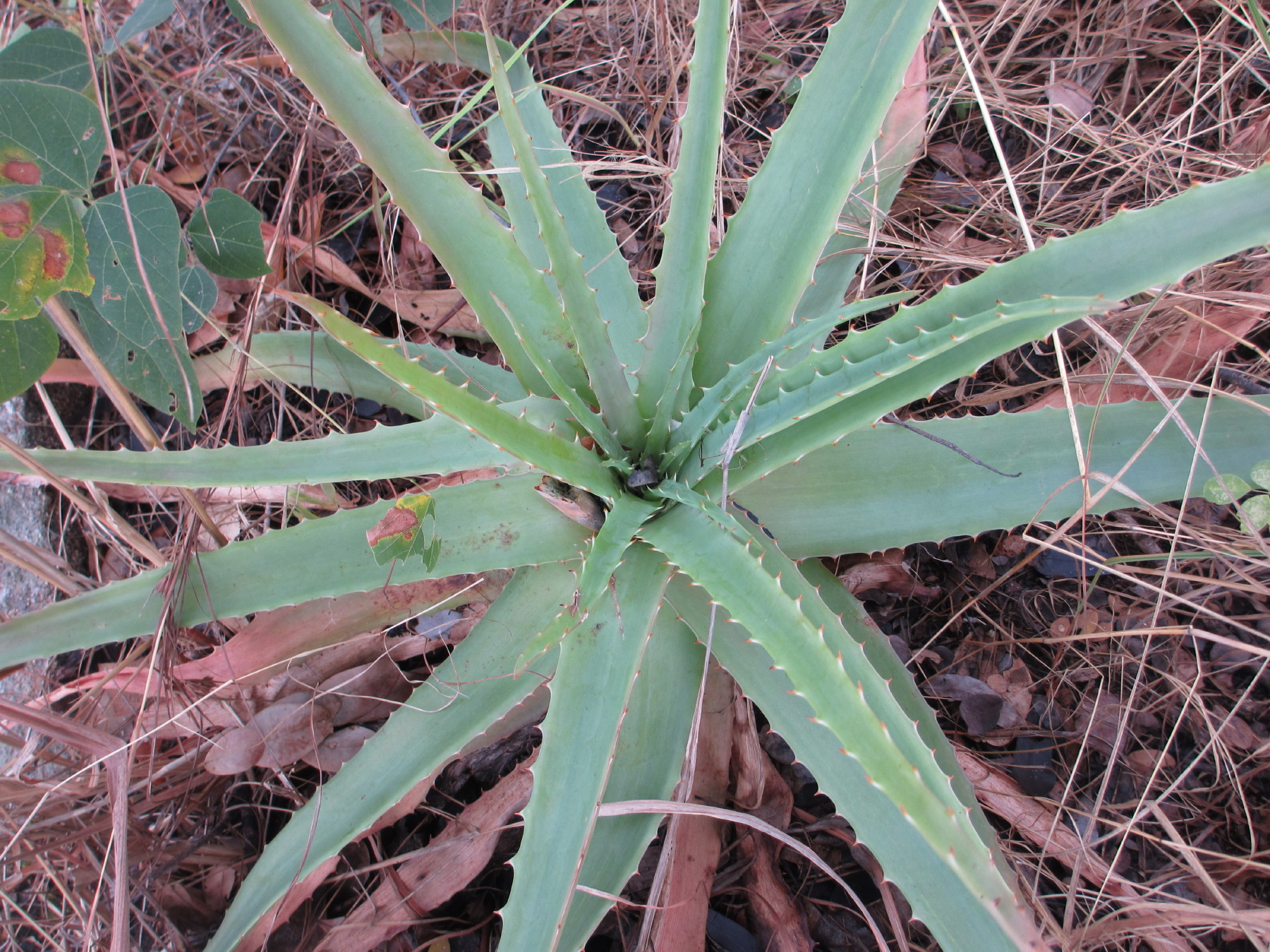
Aloe christianii, named after Harold Basil Christian.

One variety of aloe, recorded by Gilbert Reynolds as a species which Christian first collected at his farm, was named Aloe christianii in his honor, and a plant was donated to the Royal Botanic Gardens, Kew.

In 1948, he subdivided his estate, selling some portions and retaining 707 acres. On 5 June 1948, with William Daniel Gale and J. B. Richards serving as witnesses, Christian signed a codicil to his will in which he granted part of his farm, including his garden, to the state. Christian's decision to leave his garden to the state was appreciatively received by The Rhodesia Herald, which published an article on 8 June 1948 that read, "If the offer of the owner Mr. Basil Christian is accepted by the Rhodesian Government, the finest and most complete collection of aloes and cycads in the world will become the property of the Colony for all time." Christian said in an interview his work could not have been achieved and his collection could not have been expanded such were it not for the botanists at Kew and the South African government's Division of Botany, who frequently sent him new specimens. In the interview, he noted that while other gardens had a greater number of species, Ewanrigg had still made a significant contribution to science, and that the complete records of all the species would be donated to the state along with the garden.

== Death and legacy ==
After a lengthy illness, Christian died on Friday, 12 May 1950, at St Anne's Hospital in Salisbury, aged 79. He was buried the following day at Salisbury Cemetery, following a funeral liturgy at the city's Anglican cathedral. In tributes publishing following his death, Christian was remembered as a proud Old Etonian, an enthusiastic member of the Rhodesian Agricultural Union, an active member of The Salisbury Club, and a skilled horseback rider. A plaque was placed at Ewanrigg in his memory by the Botanical Society of Southern Rhodesia.

His 1921 will could not be located, nor could a 1923 codicil. However, a 1927 codicil confirming part of the original 1921 will was available, in addition to the codicil from 1948 that left his garden to the state. Some doubts existed about whether Christian had planned to donate his entire 707-acre Ewanrigg Farm, or only the 14.5 acres that were declared a national monument in 1943. The 1948 codicil was worded as such that the issue was not immediately settled. The matter was resolved amicably when his executor, his wife's lawyer, and the Minister of Internal Affairs agreed that the Christian's intention was that the entirety of Ewanrigg should be transferred to the government's Natural Resources Board and the Commission for the Preservation of Natural and Historical Monuments and Relics. It was also decided that all income of Ewanrigg should go to his wife, Annabella Roberta Kemp Saint, from whom he had been separated since 1923.

In 1950, the estate was named Ewanrigg Botanical Garden and became open to the public. In 1960, Governor Humphrey Gibbs declared it a national park. The Zimbabwe Parks and Wildlife Management Authority manage the garden today.

== See also ==
- List of professional gardeners
- List of Old Etonians born in the 19th century
