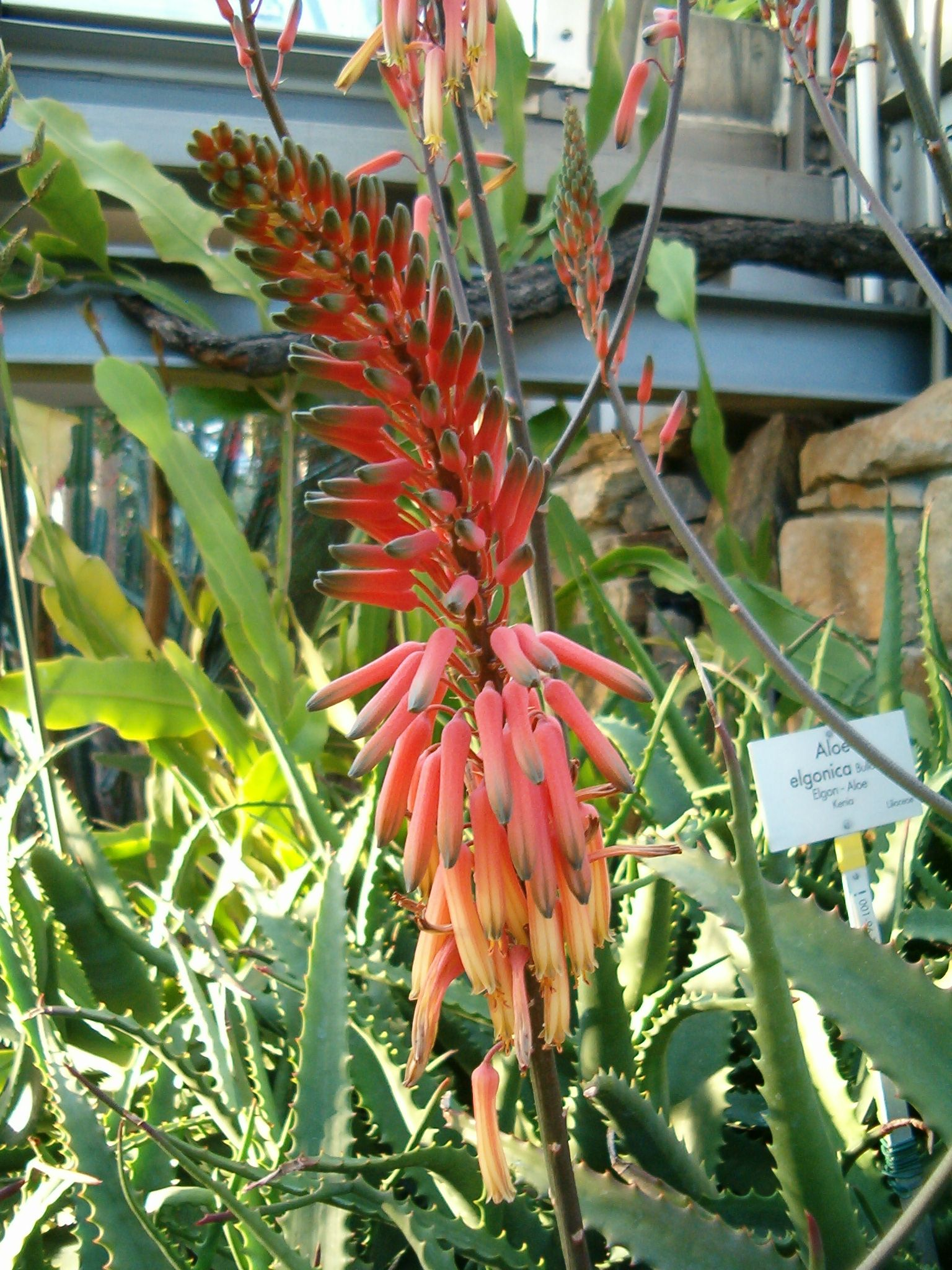

Conservation status
- Endangered (IUCN 3.1)
- CITES Appendix II (CITES)

Scientific classification
- Kingdom: Plantae
- Clade: Tracheophytes
- Clade: Angiosperms
- Clade: Monocots
- Order: Asparagales
- Family: Asphodelaceae
- Subfamily: Asphodeloideae
- Genus: Aloe
- Species: A. elgonica

Binomial name
- Aloe elgonica Bullock

= Aloe elgonica =

Species of succulent

Aloe elgonica is a species of Aloe endemic to Mount Elgon in southern Kenya.
