= Robert Allen Dyer =

South African botanist and taxonomist (1900-1987)

- Born: 21 September 1900; Pietermaritzburg, South African Republic
- Died: 26 October 1987 (aged 87); Johannesburg, South Africa
- Education: Natal University College
- Known for: Pretoria National Botanic Garden, work on succulent plants and Amaryllidaceae
- Scientific career
- Fields: Botany, taxonomy
- Workplaces: National Herbarium in Pretoria
- Author abbrev. (botany): R.A.Dyer

Robert Allen Dyer (21 September 1900 in Pietermaritzburg – 26 October 1987 in Johannesburg) was a South African botanist and taxonomist, working particularly on Amaryllidaceae and succulent plants, contributing to and editing of Bothalia and Flowering Plants of Africa and holding the office of Director of the Botanical Research Institute in Pretoria from 1944 to 1963.

== Education and career ==
Attended Michaelhouse and Natal University College 1919-1923, obtaining the degrees of M.Sc. in 1923 and D.Sc. in 1937. Appointed as assistant to Selmar Schonland in Grahamstown in 1925, as well as curator of the Albany Museum Herbarium. After doing a three-year stint (1931-1934) as liaison officer with the Royal Botanic Gardens, Kew, he was transferred to the National Herbarium in Pretoria. Here he became Chief and subsequently Director from 1944 to 1963. He revived the Botanical Survey Section and started the Pretoria National Botanic Garden, as well as editing Bothalia, The Flowering Plants of Africa, Memoirs of the Botanical Survey of South Africa, and launching the Flora of Southern Africa. After retiring in 1963, he continued working at the Institute, devoting his time to producing Genera of Southern African Flowering Plants. His last major work dealt with Ceropegia, Brachystelma and Riocreuxia and appeared in Flora of Southern Africa in 1981. In all, he produced some 450 publications.

His greatest contributions were in the field of plant taxonomy and he published extensively in Flowering Plants of Africa and Bothalia. Commemorated in the genus Radyera Bullock, Aridaria dyeri N.E.Br. and Hereroa dyeri L.Bol. His collected botanical specimens number over 6000 and are lodged in Pretoria, Grahamstown, Kew and the Bolus Herbarium.

== Major publications ==
- The Succulent Euphorbiae (1941) with White & Sloane
- The South African Cycads (Bothalia 1963)
- Flora of Southern Africa - Myrsinaceae, Primulaceae and Plumbaginaceae (1963)
- Flora of Southern Africa - Stangeriaceae, Zamiaceae (with I.C. Verdoorn 1966)
- Dyer, R. Allen (1975). The genera of Southern African flowering plants: Flora of southern Africa (vol. 1, Dicotyledons 1975; vol. 2, Monocotyledons, with Amelia Mauve, A.E. Loxton and Peter Goldblatt 1976) (3d ed.). Pretoria: Dept. of Agricultural Technical Services. ISBN 9780621028546.

== Awards and fellowships ==
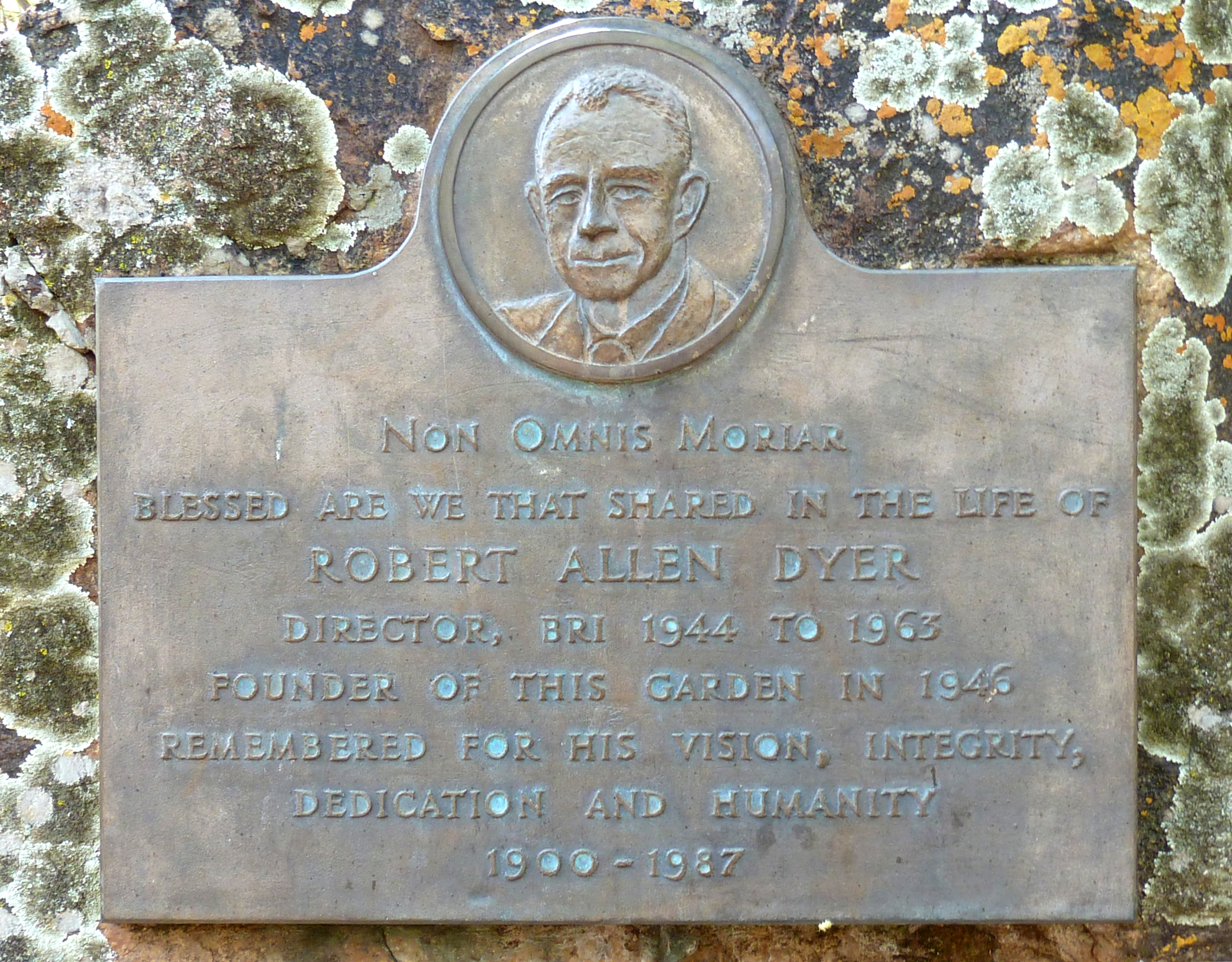
Plaque at the Pretoria National Botanical Garden

- Fellow of the American Cactus and Succulent Society 1941
- Herbert Medal (American Amaryllis Society)
- President of Section C of S.A. Assoc. for Adv. of Science 1941/42
- Fellow of the Royal Society of South Africa 1945
- President of S.A. Biological Society 1948
- Senior Capt. Scott Medal (S.A. Biological Society)
- President of Pretoria Horticultural Society 1961-1972
- S.A. Assoc. of Botanists Gold Medal 1973
- Honorary D.Sc. from Witwatersrand University 1976
