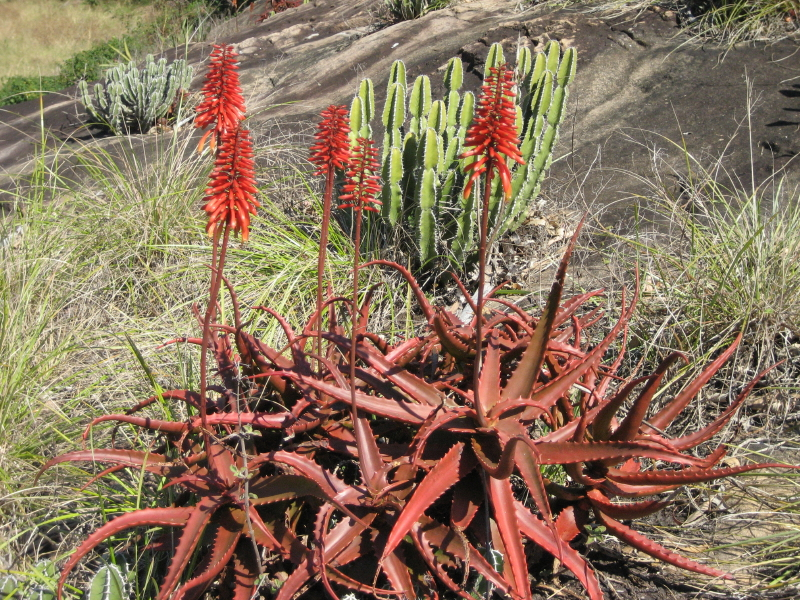

Conservation status
- Least Concern (IUCN 3.1)
- CITES Appendix II

Scientific classification
- Kingdom: Plantae
- Clade: Tracheophytes
- Clade: Angiosperms
- Clade: Monocots
- Order: Asparagales
- Family: Asphodelaceae
- Subfamily: Asphodeloideae
- Genus: Aloe
- Species: A. cameronii

Binomial name
- Aloe cameronii Hemsl.

Varieties
- Aloe cameronii var. bondana Reynolds; Aloe cameronii var. cameronii; Aloe cameronii var. dedzana Reynolds

= Aloe cameronii =

Species of succulent

Aloe cameronii is a species of flowering plant in the family Asphodelaceae native to Malawi, Mozambique, Zambia, and Zimbabwe.
