= Pretoria National Botanical Garden =

Garden in eastern Pretoria, Gauteng

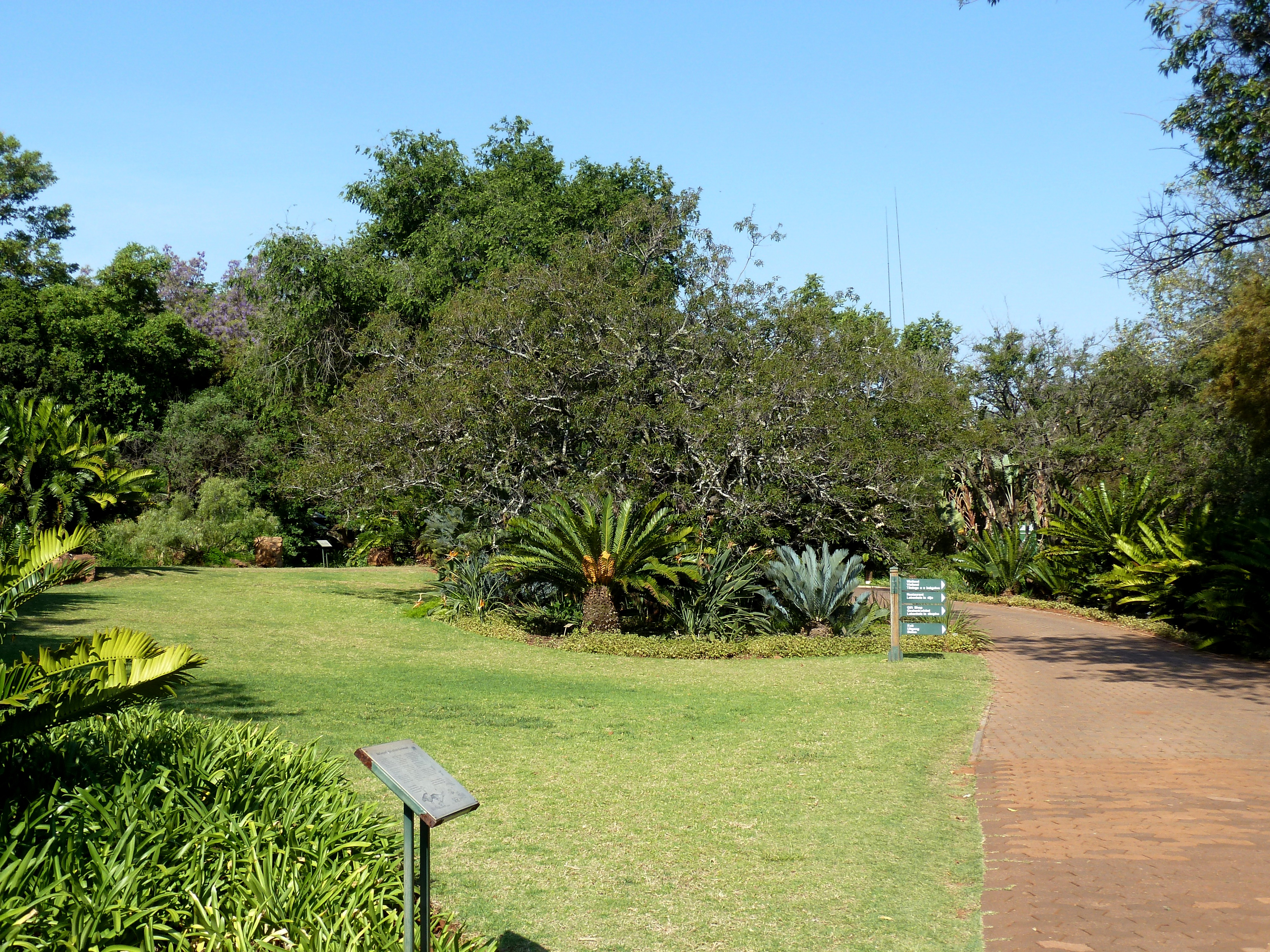
- The cycad garden in the Pretoria National Botanical Garden
- Type: Botanical
- Location: Pretoria, Gauteng
- Coordinates: 25°44′19″S 28°16′24″E
- Area: 76 hectares (190 acres)
- Created: 1946; 80 years ago
- Founder: Robert Allen Dyer
- Operator: South African National Biodiversity Institute
- Open: Daily
- Website: www.sanbi.org/gardens/pretoria
- Pretoria National Botanical Garden (South Africa) Pretoria National Botanical Garden (Gauteng)

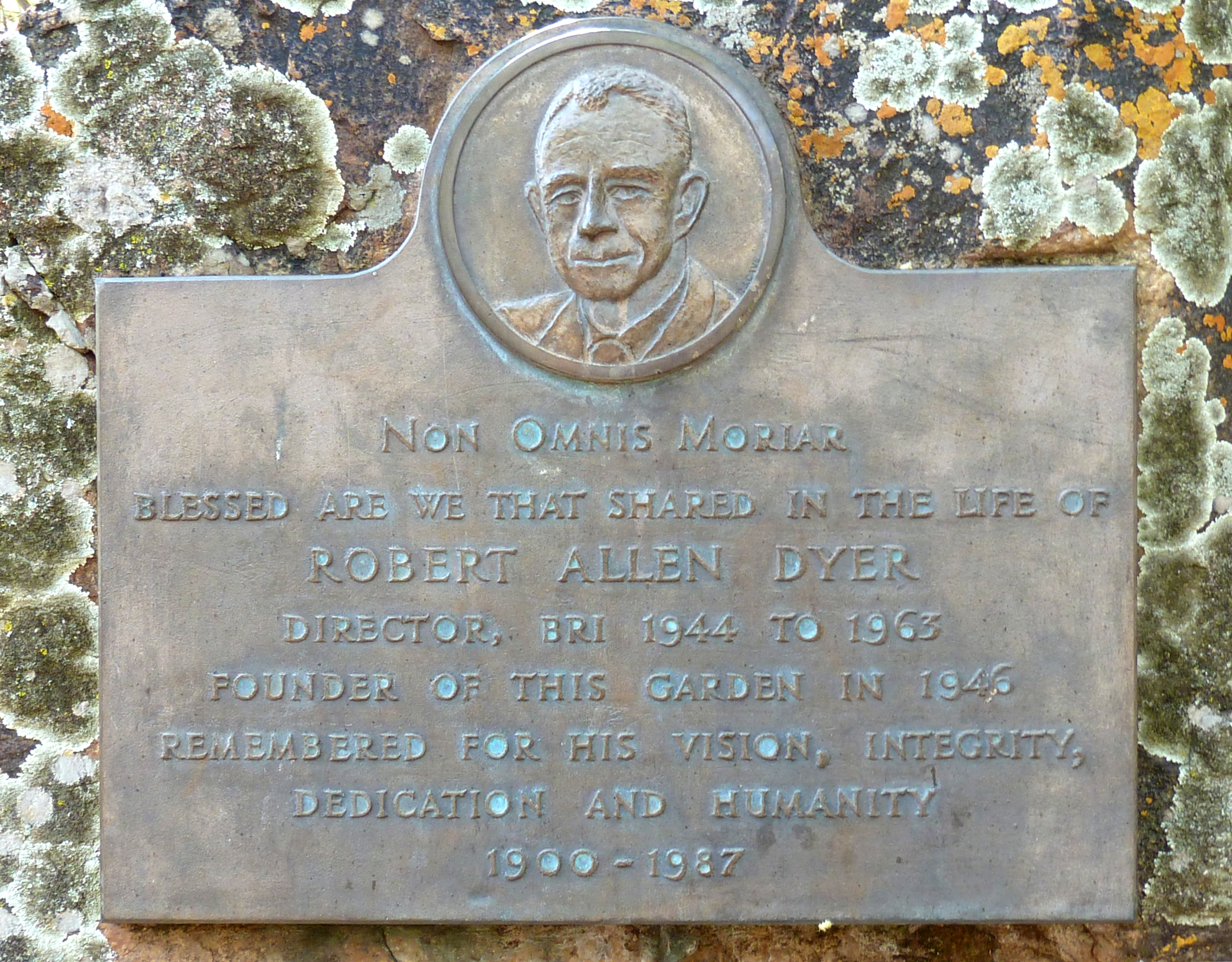
Plaque commemorating the founder of the garden, Dr R. A. Dyer

The Pretoria National Botanical Garden is one of South Africa's nine National Botanical Gardens. The garden is wedged between Pretoria Road and Cussonia Avenue in Brummeria, in eastern Pretoria, Gauteng, and flanks a central rocky ridge that runs from east to west. The 76 hectares (0.76 km^{2}) garden was established in 1946, and of late hosts the headquarters of the South African National Biodiversity Institute.

== History ==
The Garden was initially known as the 'Pretoria National Botanic Garden' and opened in June 1946 when the University of Pretoria granted approval from the Department of Agriculture for the development of a botanical garden on a piece of land that was previously part of the university's Experimental Farm. The farm had to be abandoned due the presence of poison leaf (Dichapetalum cymosum), a plant which is poisonous to livestock. The Garden was officially opened on 23 October 1958, but it could only be visited by special arrangement because it was primarily a research facility under the management of the Botanical Research Institute (BRI), which traces its origins back to 1903. The Institute amalgamated with the National Botanical Gardens of South Africa to form the National Botanical Institute in 1989, which in turn became the South African National Biodiversity Institute (SANBI) in 2004. The Garden was then opened to the public on a daily basis in 1984.

== Layout ==
The day visitors' entrance is along Cussonia Avenue. This western section contains the wetland, cycad garden, succulent garden, useful plants garden, medicinal garden and enabling garden. Situated among these is a restaurant, concert stage, tea garden and function hall beside an artificial waterfall.

It has an avenue of Bolusanthus speciosus trees by Mr Jan Evens in 1946.

Situated around the centre of the garden is the National Herbarium, Biodiversity Centre and Environmental Education Centre. The Mary Gunn Library is housed within the National Herbarium.

Aloe Lodge (formerly Velcich House) north of the ridge is destined to house offices of the Working for Wetlands and Grassland Programmes.

The eastern side of the garden is less developed. An arboretum and natural grassland is located here, besides the Dassie walking trail along the central ridge, and the garden offices.

== See also ==
- List of botanical gardens in South Africa
