= Kappa Beta Phi =

American secret society

- ΚΒΦ
- Emblem of Kappa Beta Phi. It reverses the letters of the more familiar Phi Beta Kappa.
- Founded: 1893; 133 years ago Yale University, Minnesota or Michigan
- Type: Social, post-collegiate now
- Affiliation: Independent
- Status: Active
- Scope: Local
- Motto: Dum vivamus edimus et biberimus "While we live, we eat and drink"
- Chapters: 1 active
- Headquarters: New York City, New York; United States

Kappa Beta Phi (ΚΒΦ) is a secret society with at least one surviving chapter, based on Wall Street in New York City, that is made up of high-ranking financial executives. The purpose of the organization today is largely social and honorific. The current honor society meets once a year at a black-tie dinner to induct new members.

== History ==
Members were told that the society was established as an alternative to Phi Beta Kappa to allow young men to meet and share ideas in an atmosphere of pub conviviality rather than more formal and elitist salon discussions; its reversed Greek letters were purportedly chosen to reinforce the contrast.

To decipher the group's actual founding and provide context, university yearbooks began as student publications, often organized by fraternities with the result that the Greek Letter organizations gained prominent billing in the books, along with athletics and other clubs, and often, printed extensive humor sections. The joking, at times rendered in poetic style, with cartoons, other illustrations, elaborate spoofs, and short news items were immensely popular, driving sales, and allowing the editors and contributors a rare opportunity to poke fun. Their targets included academic administrations, topical news, and other members of the class with nicknames and remarks about habits as between intimate friends. Where jokes and satire wouldn't play well on a Greek letter organization's actual pages whose members were the rabid purchasers of the books, an inventive, sharp-tongued writer could offer, instead, a fictitious entity, and pages of joking. These editors would sometimes even sign off with an apology closing the section to those who might be offended. Virtually every school student body offered these books, which in the Big Ten schools and other large state schools could reach over 700 pages. This phenomenon was virtually ubiquitous nationally throughout the 1870s until the Great Depression when the average yearbook became smaller, and more polite, dropping to perhaps half its size from just a few years earlier.

The most likely origin of Kappa Beta Phi, therefore, was as an inside joke, perhaps at Yale, Hobart, Minnesota, or Michigan, repeated immediately by other campus editors who heard of the idea and soon populated their chapters with actual members willing to appear in a photo or participate in a party or two. When the organization petered out on campuses in the Great Depression, a post-collegiate Wall Street chapter took on the mantle, and has continued the organization since that time.

The 1941 University of Miami Ibis yearbook noted that the letters Kappa Beta Phi stood for "Kursed by the Faculty", and referred to the same Welsh Tennyson motto that the Minnesota and Hobart chapters had previously used. In its 1894 Minnesota Gopher yearbook, a chapter of Kappa Beta Phi is pictured, with what is reasonably understood as a parody chapter list, at least in part, adjacent to the Phi Beta Kappa page. This 1894 mention may be the oldest printed reference found.

There was some consistency between college yearbooks for these early mentions, where the Hobart Echo yearbook of 1929 notes a roll of chapters abbreviated from that cited by the Minnesota chapter. It places the Hobart chapter as being founded in 1890, and the University of Minnesota in 1893, just after Hobart. The Minnesota chapter list does not date the chapters, but the Hobart chapter is earlier in the list than Minnesota's several other old-line schools. A membership card of the University of Michigan chapter of Kappa Beta Phi for the 1952–53 college year supports the club's founding date by featuring the phrase "Founded 1776"; this too is also likely in jest and undocumented.

An image of the Kappa Beta Phi key of that era is printed as background on the membership card and shows in the lower left corner a hand pointing at a stein in the upper right corner, three stars in the upper left corner, and a blank lower right corner. Membership was by invitation and open only to men belonging to one of five Greek-letter social fraternities, including Psi Upsilon. The Michigan chapter's purpose was entirely social and revolved around several parties and picnics per year at which alcoholic drinks were always available. An all-day initiation was held once a year in a secluded farm field and involved excessive drinking.

By the 1930s, dozens of chapters were suggested by various yearbook mentions. Some may have been in de facto existence, primarily on college campuses, or the bulk of these may have been an ongoing series of yearbook jokes, egged on by satiric-minded editors. Where it existed, the society was known for being made up of men with a sense of humor. Many colleges and traditional fraternities fought to abolish Kappa Beta Phi since it was often characterized as a fraternity solely for drinking and partying while making a mockery of academics and more reputable organizations such as Phi Beta Kappa.

The Wall Street chapter of Kappa Beta Phi was founded in 1929 before the stock market crash and is the only remaining chapter of the society. The stated purpose of the Wall Street chapter is to "keep alive the spirit of the "good old days of 1928–29."

The College of Mount Saint Vincent, based in Brooklyn, published a commentary letter from its president emeritus Charles L. Flynn Jr. distancing the college from any relation with the organization. Written in 2014, the letter may be satiric in nature itself; it fully adopts modern tropes and sensitivities, and for an academic letter is pointedly critical. Given the media interest in Wall Street excess during that decade, where outsiders certainly did show alarm over the purported antics of the Wall Street chapter, it is unclear what connection, besides the emergence of a The Chronicle of Higher Education article may have sparked Flynn's response.

== Symbols and traditions ==
The organization's name is a reversal of Phi Beta Kappa. Instead of a key, the members wear a fob tied to a red ribbon around their necks. Kappa Beta Phi's insignia consists of a beer stein, a champagne glass, a pointing hand, and five stars. The group's Latin motto, Dum vivamus edimus et biberimus roughly translates as, "While we live, we eat and drink".

Kappa Beta Phi's earlier motto, regularly stated in early 20th century yearbooks, was the Welsh phrase popularized by Alfred, Lord Tennyson, "Ygwir yn erbyn y byd", which in English means, "The truth against the world". Its use predates Tennyson, and he had it engraved in the floor at the entrance to his home.

The organization's officers bear odd titles such as Grand Swipe (the president), Grand Smudge, Grand Loaf, and Master at Arms. The annual dinner has been described by The Wall Street Journal as "part Friar's Club roast, part 'Gong Show.'" New inductees are expected to perform in a variety show to entertain the members, and many inductees benefit from professional coaches and writers to prepare them for their performances. Backed by a five-piece band, the inductees performed renditions of well-known tunes with lyrics modified to satirize Wall Street. In New York Magazine, Kevin Roose reported from one of their secret meetings in 2014.

== Chapters ==
Following is a list of Kappa Beta Phi chapters.

Chartered	Institution	Location	Status	References
	Trinity College	Cambridge, England	Inactive	
1890s	Hobart University	Geneva, New York	Inactive	
1890s	Lafayette College	Easton, Pennsylvania	Inactive	
1890s	Williams College	Williamstown, Massachusetts	Inactive	
1890s	University of Rochester	Rochester, New York	Inactive	
1890s	Amherst College	Amherst, Massachusetts	Inactive	
1890s	Cornell University	Ithaca, New York	Inactive	
1890s	Columbia College	New York City, New York	Inactive	
1890s	Lehigh University	Bethlehem, Pennsylvania	Inactive	
1890s	University of Pennsylvania	Philadelphia, Pennsylvania	Inactive	
1890s	Union College	Schenectady, New York	Inactive	
1890s	Dartmouth College	Hanover, New Hampshire	Inactive	
1890s	Brown University	Providence, Rhode Island	Inactive	
1893	University of Minnesota	Saint Paul, Minnesota	Inactive	
	University of Michigan	Ann Arbor, Michigan	Inactive	
1929	Wall Street (non-collegiate)	Manhattan, New York City, New York	Active	
1941	University of Miami	Coral Gables, Florida	Inactive	

== Notable members ==
About 15 to 20 new members are inducted to the Wall Street chapter each year. Historically, the organization has inducted top executives of various Wall Street firms, including:

- Michael Bloomberg (Wall Street), former Mayor of New York City, 2002 to 2013
- James Cayne (Wall Street), former CEO of Bear Stearns
- Jon Corzine (Wall Street), former Governor of New Jersey, 2006 to 2010, and former U.S. Senator from New Jersey, 2001 to 2006
- Nigel MacEwan (Wall Street), former CEO of Kleinwort Benson North America and former president of Merrill Lynch
- Larry Fink (Wall Street), CEO of BlackRock
- Richard S. Fuld Jr. (Wall Street), former chairman and CEO of Lehman Brothers
- Richard Grasso (Wall Street), former head of the New York Stock Exchange
- Josh Harris (Wall Street), co-founder of Apollo Global Management
- David Komansky (Wall Street), former CEO of Merrill Lynch
- Sallie Krawcheck (Wall Street), former head of Citigroup's wealth management division
- Ken Langone (Wall Street), former chair of the New York Stock Exchange compensation committee
- Robert F. Greenhill (Wall Street), founder and former CEO of Greenhill &Co. investment bank
- Marc Lasry (Wall Street), CEO of Avenue Capital Group
- Martin Lipton (Wall Street), founding partner of Wachtell, Lipton, Rosen & Katz
- Wilbur Ross (Wall Street), former U.S. Secretary of Commerce, 2017 to 2021
- Alan Schwartz (Wall Street), former president of Bear Stearns
- Robert Rubin (Wall Street), former U.S. Treasury Secretary, 1995 to 1999, and former co-chair of Goldman Sachs
- Mary Schapiro (Wall Street), former chairperson of the U.S. Securities and Exchange Commission, 2009 to 2012
- Diana Taylor (Wall Street), former New York State Banking Department superintendent
- Warren Stephens (Wall Street), former CEO of Stephens Inc.
- Sanford I. Weill (Wall Street), former CEO of Citigroup
- John C. Whitehead (Wall Street), former chair of Goldman Sachs
