= Wervershoof =

- Village
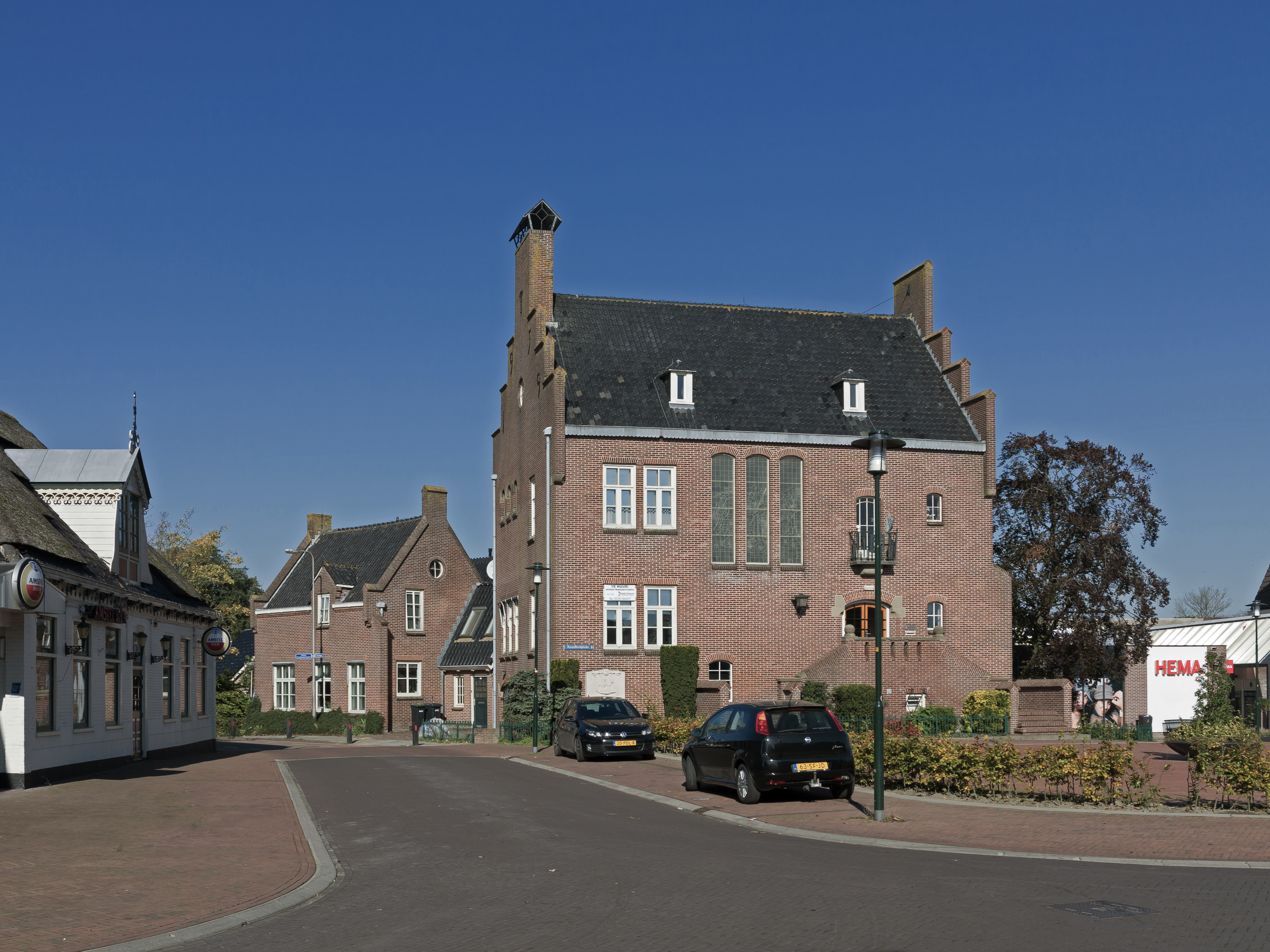
- Former town hall

- Flag Coat of arms

- Location in the Netherlands Location in the province of North Holland in the Netherlands
- Coordinates: 52.73°N 5.17°E
- Country: Netherlands
- Province: North Holland
- Municipality: Medemblik

Area
  - Village: 15.77 km^{2} (6.09 sq mi)
- Elevation: −0.8 m (−2.6 ft)

Population (2025)
  - Village: 6,315
  - Density: 400.4/km^{2} (1,037/sq mi)
  - Urban: 6,010
  - Rural: 305
- Time zone: UTC+1 (CET)
  - Summer (DST): UTC+2 (CEST)
- Postal code: 1693
- Dialing code: 0228

Wervershoof (Dutch: [ˌʋɛrvərsˈɦoːf]; West Frisian: Werfershouf) is a small town and former municipality in the north-western Netherlands, in the province of North Holland and the region of West-Frisia. Since 1 January 2011 it has been part of the municipality of Medemblik. The N240 and N302 roads run through the town.

There are a number of versions of the origin of the name Wervershoof. It may come from the preacher Werenfridus, a follower of Willibrord who came to the area in 690 and later lived on a farm there. The old parish church was dedicated to St. Werenfridus. A settlement named 'Werfaertshof' is mentioned on a map in 1288.

Until the early 19th century, the population fluctuated between 250 and 400. The number grew after 1817 when it became an independent municipality and in 1868 there were nearly 800 inhabitants. The municipality was then enlarged by adding High and Low Zwaagdijk, after which it had about 1,600 inhabitants. After slow growth in the early 20th century, the population grew more rapidly after World War II, increasing from 2,000 to just over 5,000 over a 40-year period. The other places in the municipality grew more slowly than Wervershoof. On 1 January 2010, the town had 8,794 inhabitants.

== Local government ==
The last municipal council of Wervershoof consisted of 13 seats, which at the 2006 election, were divided as follows:

- Algemene Belangen Combinatie (ABC) - 3 seats
- Christian Democratic Appeal (CDA) - 2 seats
- Progressief Wervershoof (PW) - 2 seats
- People's Party for Freedom and Democracy (VVD) - 2 seats
- Zwaagdijker Dorpsbelang - 2 seats
- Labour Party (PvdA) - 2 seats

An election was held in November 2010 for a council for the new Medemblik municipality that merged Medemblik with both Wervershoof and Andijk. This commenced work on 1 January 2011. The last mayor of the Wervershoof municipality was Floris Vletter (VVD).

== Notable people born in Wervershoof ==
- Jelle and Dion Bakker (1983 and 1981), creator of Jelle's Marble Runs YouTube channel
- Yvonne Spigt (1988), skater, Dutch champion marathon skating on natural ice 2008 and 2012
- Bert Steltenpool (1994), professional football player
