= Christiana Riley =

Financial CEO

- Education: Princeton University
- Occupation: Business executive
- Title: Regional Head of North America at Banco Santander
- Spouse: Christopher Bruce Riley
- Children: 2

Christiana Riley is Regional Head of North America at Banco Santander, a position she started in October 2023.

== Early life and education ==
Riley grew up in Connecticut and graduated from Greenwich High School in 1996. In 2000, she attended Princeton University, where she majored in Romance languages and earned a Bachelor of Arts degree. In 2005 she completed her Masters of Business Administration at the London Business School.

== Career ==
Riley's professional career began in 2000 at the investment bank Greenhill & Co., where she worked as an analyst in the New York office and later relocated to Frankfurt. From there she moved to the consulting firm McKinsey, where she worked from 2004 to 2006 as an associate.

In 2006, Riley began working at Deutsche Bank. There she first worked in the strategy department, which she headed from 2011 to 2015. In 2019 the Wall Street Journal reported she was proposed as the next CEO for the Americas region., and she was appointed to that role in late 2019. On January 1, 2020, she joined the Management Board of Deutsche Bank, the only woman to serve on the board in her official role as Chief Executive Officer for DB USA Corp with responsibility for the Americas region. The Financial Times named her one of the ten key figures on Wall Street in 2020. Riley's work at Deutsche Bank included considering investments in Mexico and working to bring people back to the company's US offices during the COVID-19 pandemic. She condemned the attack on the Capitol in Washington by Donald Trump supporters in a LinkedIn post that was covered by the media.

Christiana joined Santander in 2023 as Regional Head of North America, responsible for all Santander businesses in Mexico and the United States. She is also a member of the board of PagoNxt, a leading payment solution provider for merchants, international corporates, SMEs, and consumers, fully owned by Santander.

== Personal ==
In 2004 she married Christopher Bruce Riley. Riley has two children.
