= Joseph Skelly =

Joseph Skelly may refer to:

- Joseph Morrison Skelly, professor of history
- Joseph P. Skelly, composer of music
