= Action (store) =

Dutch multinational discount store chain

- Type: Private
- Industry: Retail
- Founded: July 1993; 33 years ago in Enkhuizen, Netherlands
- Founders: Gerard Deen; Rob Wagemaker
- Headquarters: Zwaagdijk-Oost, Netherlands
- Number of locations: 3,540 (2026)
- Area served: Austria, Belgium, Croatia, Czechia, France, Germany, Italy, Luxembourg, Netherlands, Poland, Portugal, Romania, Slovakia, Slovenia, Spain, Switzerland
- Key people: Hajir Hajji (CEO); Joost Sliepenbeek (CFO); Simon Borrows (chairman)
- Revenue: €16 billion (2025)
- Owner: 3i Group (65.4%)
- Number of employees: 84,246 (2025)
- Website: action.com

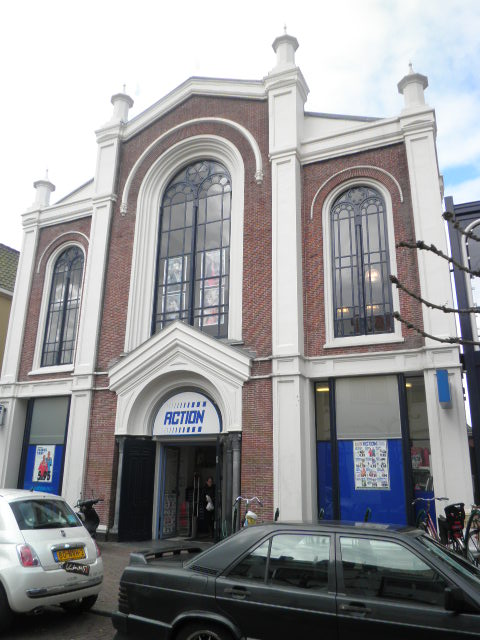
Action store in a former church in Hoorn, Netherlands

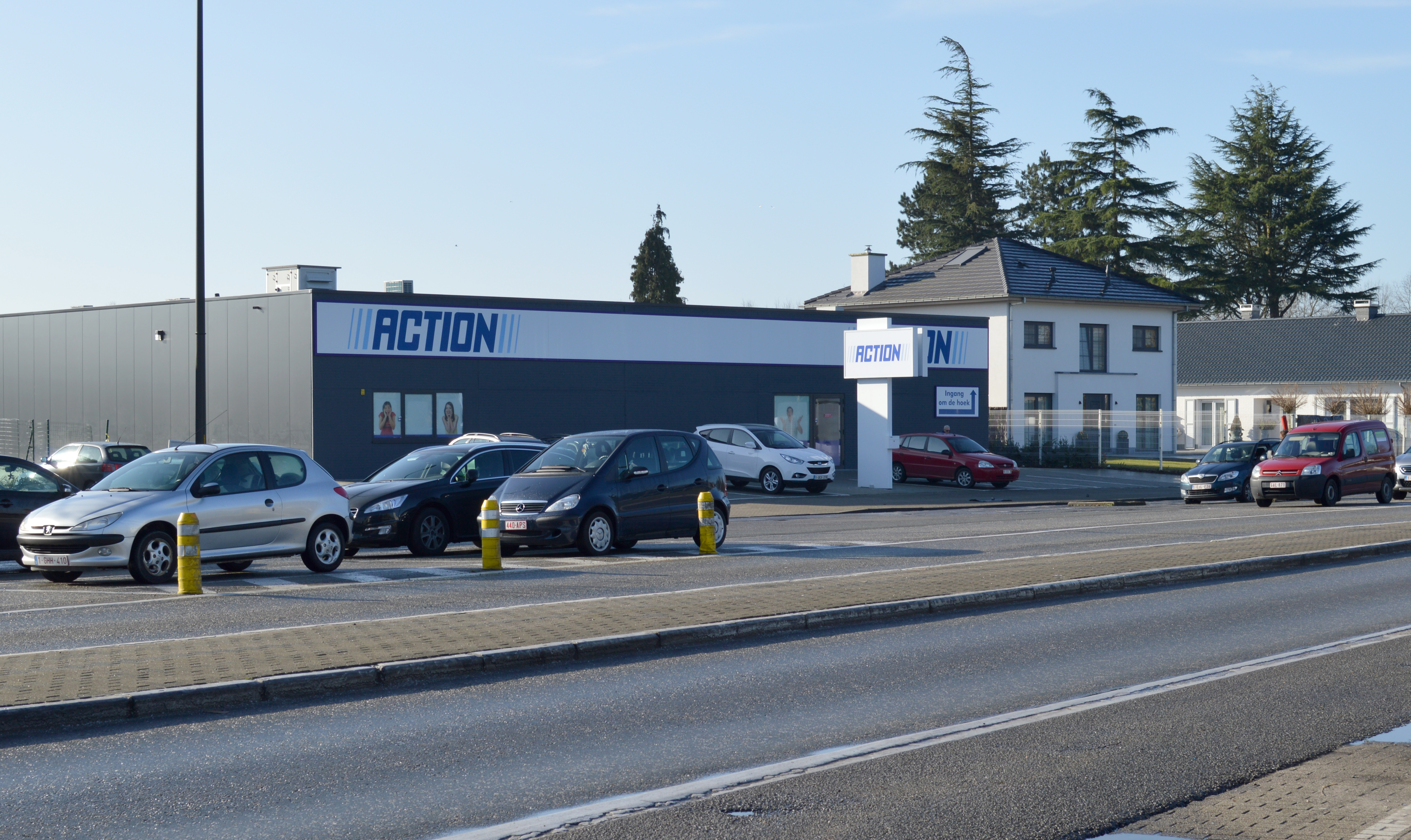
Action store in Overmere, Belgium

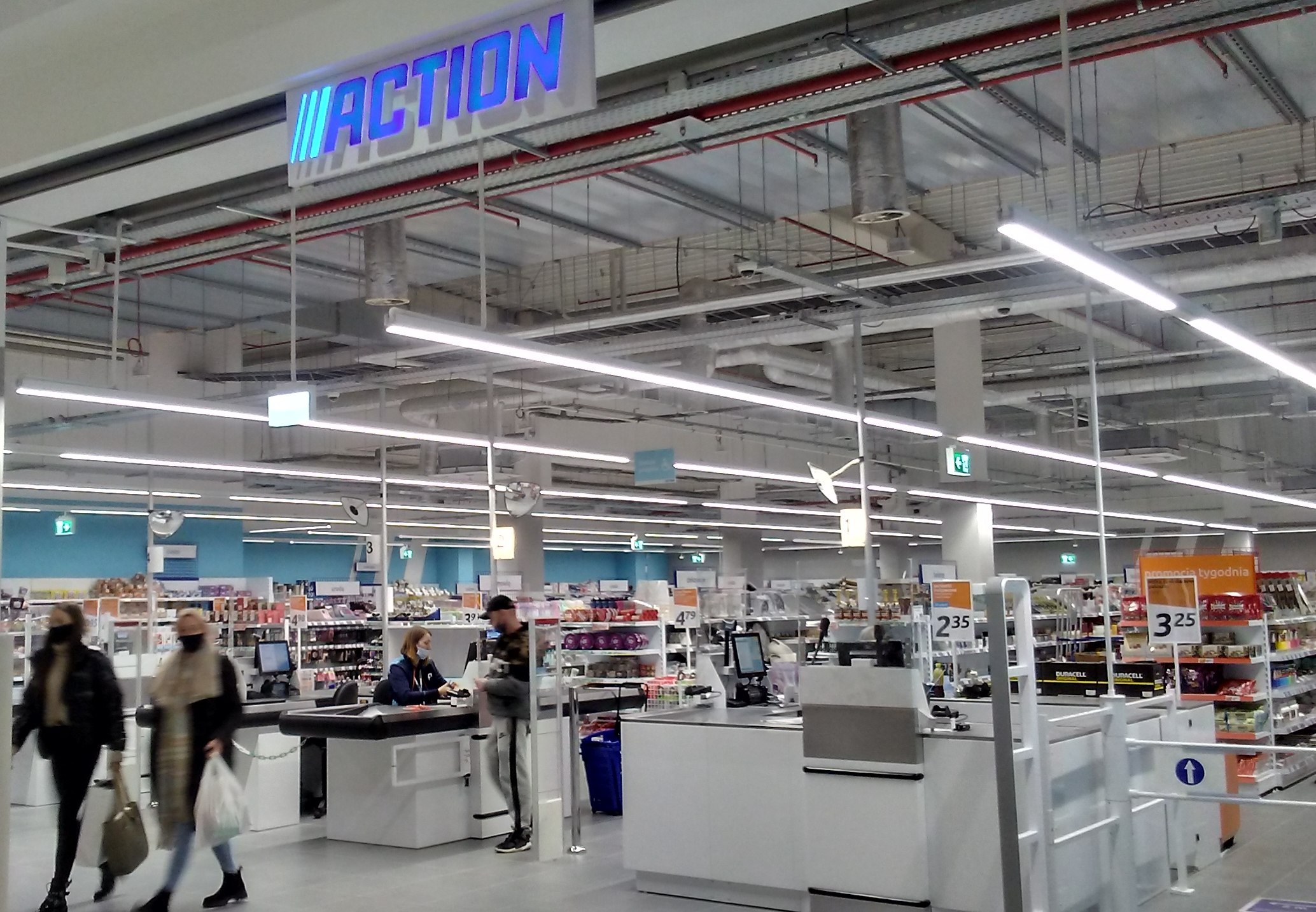
Action store in Tomaszów Mazowiecki, Poland

Action is a Dutch multinational discount store chain headquartered in Zwaagdijk-Oost, North Holland. Founded in Enkhuizen in 1993, the company primarily sells low-priced non-food products, alongside a smaller selection of food and beverages. Its assortment includes household goods, cleaning products, personal care products, toys, stationery, clothing, home textiles, do-it-yourself products and seasonal goods.

As of June 2026, Action operated 3,423 stores in 15 European countries. In 2025, the company recorded net sales of €16.0 billion and employed 84,246 people at the end of the year.

Action is majority-owned by the British investment company 3i Group, which acquired a majority interest in the retailer in 2011. By March 2026, 3i's equity interest had increased to 65.4%.

== History ==
=== Founding and expansion in the Netherlands ===
Action was founded in 1993 by Gerard Deen and Rob Wagemaker, who converted Deen's antiques shop in Enkhuizen into the first Action store. Gerard's brother Boris later joined the company. Several additional stores opened in North Holland during the company's first year, and by the end of 2002 the chain had grown to 94 stores.

The company's early assortment consisted largely of surplus and closeout merchandise sold at low prices, with stock changing rapidly. As the chain expanded, its business model developed into a broader discount format.

=== International expansion ===
European countries with Action stores

Action began expanding outside the Netherlands in 2005, when it opened its first Belgian store in Rijkevorsel. Germany followed in 2009 and France in 2012.

The chain entered Austria and Luxembourg in 2015, followed by Poland in 2017. Its expansion accelerated during the 2020s: the first stores in the Czech Republic opened in 2020, followed by Italy in 2021, Spain in 2022, Slovakia in 2023 and Portugal in 2024.

In April 2025, Action entered Switzerland with a store in Bachenbülach in the canton of Zürich. On 5 June 2025, it opened its 3,000th store, in San Rocco al Porto, Italy.

Romania became Action's fourteenth market on 24 September 2025, when its first store opened in Pitești.

Action entered Croatia, its fifteenth market, in March 2026, opening its first store in Sesvete, near Zagreb. The company announced plans to enter Slovenia later in 2026, Bulgaria in 2027, and the United States in late 2027 or early 2028.

== Business model and assortment ==
Action is a non-food discount retailer whose stores carry around 6,000 products across 14 categories. The categories include garden and outdoor, household, linen, toys, personal care, laundry and cleaning, food and drink, sports, clothing, stationery and hobby, do-it-yourself, decoration, multimedia and pet products.

Around two-thirds of the assortment changes regularly, while the company introduces more than 150 new products each week. Action sells both established consumer brands and private-label products.

The company's business model relies on large-volume purchasing, a standardised store format, low operating costs and a frequently changing assortment. Its sourcing also includes stock-lot traders, a model that can involve purchasing surplus inventory in one market for resale in another.

== Ownership ==
In 2011, 3i Group and funds managed by 3i acquired a majority interest in Action from its founders. At the time, Action operated more than 250 stores in the Benelux countries and Germany and employed more than 7,000 people.

3i subsequently increased its interest in the company through a series of transactions. Its equity ownership rose from 57.9% in March 2025 to 65.4% by March 2026.

== Logistics ==
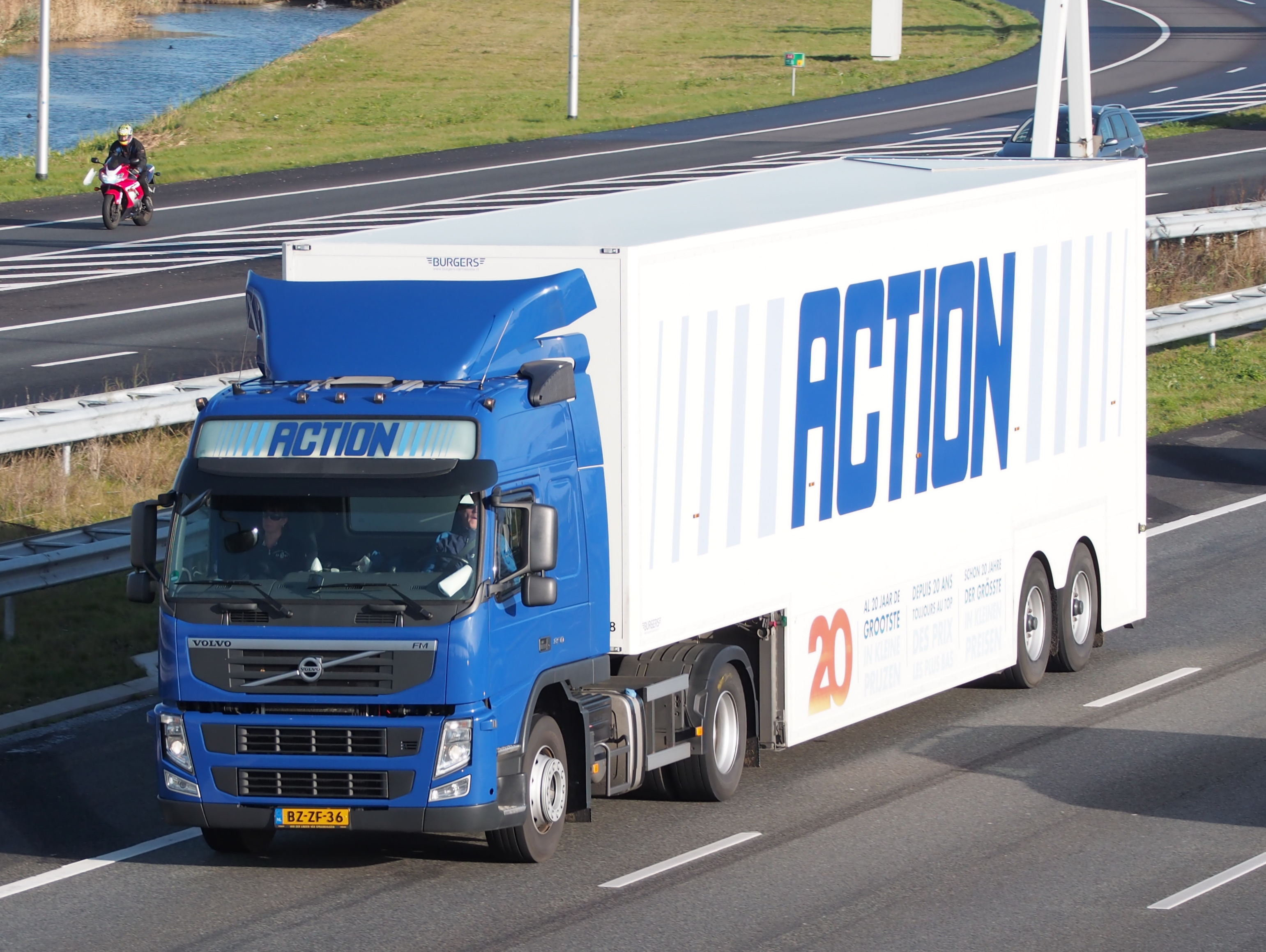
Action double-deck trailer used for transporting lightweight goods

Action distributes products to its stores through a network of distribution centres across Europe. Its first distribution centre opened in 1995, while a new headquarters and distribution centre in Zwaagdijk-Oost opened in November 2003. The distribution network subsequently expanded within the Netherlands and into other European markets as the company grew internationally.

By the end of 2025, Action operated 18 distribution centres and four logistics hubs in Europe. In June 2026, the company opened its nineteenth European distribution centre, in Ferentino, Italy.
