= Dinter =

Dinter is a German surname meaning "manufacturer of ink". Notable people with the surname include:

- Artur Dinter (1876–1948), German writer and Nazi politician
- Daan van Dinter (born 1989), Dutch footballer
- Gustav Friedrich Dinter (1760–1831), German pedagogue, theologian and author
- Kurt Dinter (1868–1945), German botanist, and explorer in South West Africa

== See also ==
- Gail Dinter-Gottlieb, American university administrator
