= Max Soliven =

Philippine journalist (1929–2006)

Maximo Soliven
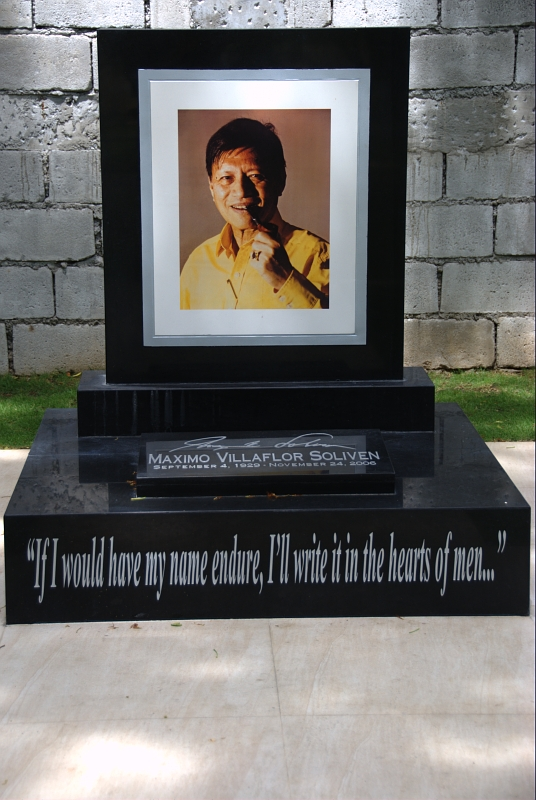
- The tomb of Max Soliven at the Libingan ng mga Bayani
- Born: Maximo Villaflor Soliven; September 4, 1929; Ermita, Manila, Insular Government of the Philippine Islands
- Died: November 24, 2006 (aged 77); Narita International Airport; Narita, Chiba, Japan
- Resting place: Libingan ng mga Bayani, Taguig
- Monuments: Soliven Monument at Roxas Boulevard Baywalk
- Other name: Max Soliven
- Education: Ateneo de Manila University (BA); Fordham University (MA)
- Occupations: journalist, newspaper publisher, activist, television host, philanthropist
- Known for: co-founder of The Philippine Star
- Notable work: Ave Triumphator, By the Way
- Spouse: Preciosa Silverio Soliven
- Children: 3

Maximo Villaflor Soliven (September 4, 1929 – November 24, 2006) was a Filipino journalist and newspaper publisher. In a career spanning six decades, he co-founded both the Philippine Daily Inquirer (1985) and The Philippine Star (1986), serving as the latter's publisher until his death.

He was the brother of prominent real estate developer Vic Soliven.

== Early life and education ==
Soliven was born on September 4, 1929, at the Philippine General Hospital in Manila, Philippines. His father Benito, who died from aftereffects of the Bataan Death March and imprisonment in Capas, Tarlac during World War II, was elected to serve in the pre-war National Assembly. Soliven spent his undergraduate years at the Ateneo de Manila University, where he received the OZANAM award for writing. Soliven received a Master of Arts from Fordham University and Johns Hopkins University's School of Advanced and International Studies.

Soliven was proficient in Spanish, as it was one of the languages used by his Ilocano grandparents.

Max was the eldest of ten children. His brothers and sisters were Guillermo, Regulo, Manuel, Mercedes, Teresa, Augusta, Victorio, Ethelinda, Benito. Victorio Villaflor Soliven (b. November 26, 1938 - d. November 13, 2010, the husband of Purita Ramirez Soliven) are the owners of VV Soliven Group of Companies. His youngest sister, Ethel Soliven Timbol, is also a journalist. She was a writer and Lifestyle Editor of the Manila Bulletin from 1964, retiring in 2007.

Max was asthmatic as a child, inspiring an early nickname from his siblings as "the guy who never sleeps, but talks at night."

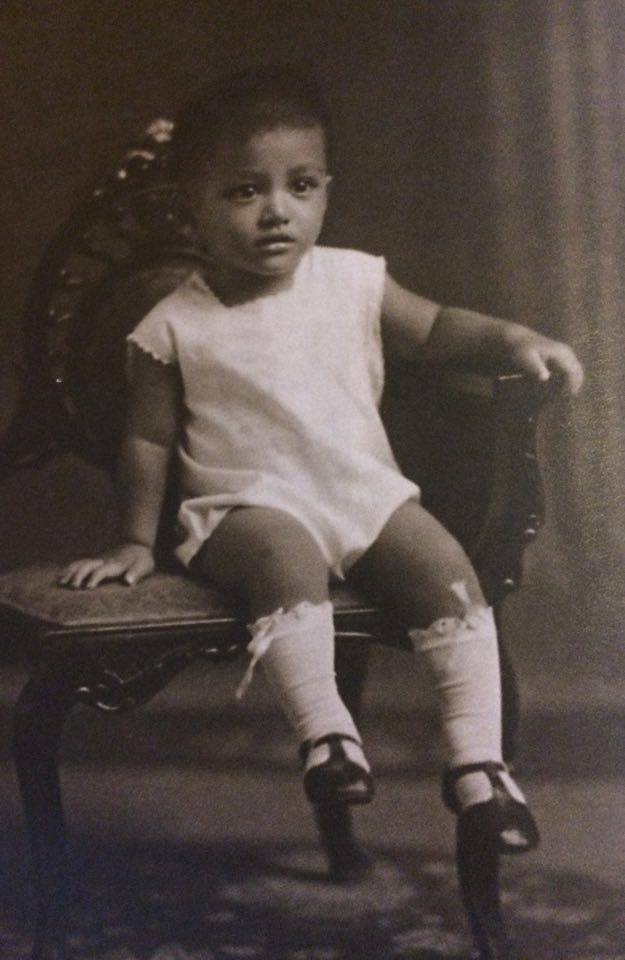
Soliven takes his first formal photograph (from Maximo V. Soliven: The Man and the Journalist)

At the age of seven, Max was reciting poems and delivering speeches as he imitated his father. He wrote poetry at the age of thirteen and continued until he was twenty-one.

When his father died at the age of 44, Max helped his mother, who was 30 years old at the time, support the family. At the age of 12, Max served as the role model and assumed the role of father figure to his younger siblings. He worked for the Jesuits as a messenger and errand boy using a second-hand bicycle he had saved up for. He also sold cigarettes and shined shoes in helping his mother support his nine siblings. While working these odd jobs, Max won academic medals as a scholar at the Ateneo de Manila University.

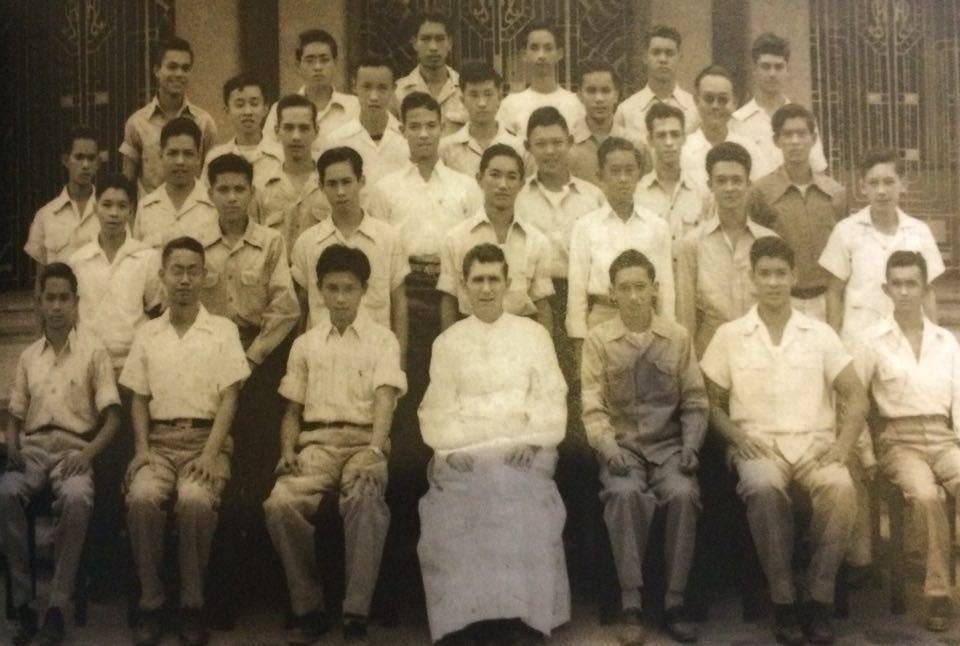
Soliven (2nd row, 2nd from the left) sits with his fellow members of Guild 47, along with Father Raymond Gough, S.J. (from Maximo V. Soliven: The Man and the Journalist)

Soliven spoke English as a first language, like most children of the pre-war Filipino middle class. He also spoke Latin, Spanish, and Ilocano.

Max received all his schooling, from elementary to college, in the Ateneo de Manila University (GS' 1953, HS' 1957). He also went on to receive a master's degree from Fordham, a Jesuit school in New York City.

While Ateneo was closed for rebuilding after the war, Max was sent to Japanese vocational school in Escolta where he learned Japanese, typing, and stenography. He was then sent to Paco Parochial School.

In June 1945, classes in Ateneo were resumed for third and fourth year high school students only in Plaza Guipit. Max was accepted in third year and became part of Ateneo's Guild 47 or High School Class 1947. His classmates included Cesar Concio, Ramon Pedrosa, Luis Lorenzo, Jose Tuazon, Jesus Ayala, Onofre Pagsanhan, Johnny Araneta, Ramon Hontiveros, Florentino Gonzales, Hector Quesada, and Ricardo Lopa.

Guild 47 would be the first class to graduate from the Padre Faura campus, which reopened after World War II for the 1946–47 school year. About half the class, including Max, stayed in Ateneo for college and would belong to the Class of 1951.

Max took some pre-law courses as his initial career preference was law, but he stuck to writing, obeying his father's deathbed wishes.

Whilst in college, Max joined The Guidon, the school's official student publication, and served as its managing editor. He served as part of the College Editors Guild, which he would become vice-president of in 1949–50, attending conferences at Iloilo, Cebu, and Zamboanga. Before graduating in March 1951, Max joined the Sentinel, the weekly newspaper published by the Archdiocese of Manila as associate editor.

Max was also an active member of the Ateneo's Chesterton Evidence Guild as a champion debator and orator.

Taking his father's interest in military and his admiration for Foch, Max took ROTC for four years, twice as required and two by choice as he became a corps commander.

After graduating from college, Max accepted an offer from the Jesuits to be a construction overseer of their college in Cebu City. He did this while he made inquiries about scholarship grants to the United States. After Cebu, Max worked full-time for The Sentinel. Assigned to the defense beat, Max would meet Ramon Magsaysay, a congressman from Zambales who became Secretary of Defense in late 1950. Max eventually received two scholarships: the Fulbright for travel expenses and the Smith-Mundt covering tuition, board and lodging, and some pocket money.

In August 1951, Max went to New York for the fall term at Fordham, where he formed his political ideas, which included a dislike for ideological movements like Communism, Fascism, and any form of state control.

Although Max did not have to work, he took a part-time job as a waiter in the school cafeteria, sending $100 each month to subsidize his brother Willie's studies in the Philippines.

In his spare time, Max would go to the UN headquarters when the United Nations was in session, especially when Philippine ambassador General Carlos Romulo was present. Romulo was a fellow Ilocano and close friend of his father, while both studied in UP. Romulo was Max's original role model as a journalist.

Whilst in Fordham, Max also developed a predilection for smoking pipes, accumulating over 300 pipes of different sizes, materials, and origins. Max also became a stamp and toy soldier collector, and accumulated a collection of books by the mid-Nineties.

When Max finished his Master's in journalism in 1954, he moved to Washington, D.C. for a one-year Master's program in international affairs in the Paul H. Nitze School of Advanced International Studies (SAIS) in Johns Hopkins University. He was accepted along with around 100 other students, drawn from a pool of foreign affairs and think-tank experts and scholars. It was here where Max developed an interest in Vietnam, which led to his involvement in covering foreign affairs as a journalist.

=== Marriage ===
While studying in New York City for university, Max got engaged to an American woman. One week before the wedding, the woman asked Max to consider her wish to live in the US. Max said, "No ifs or buts; my life is in the Philippines. I must serve my own country and that is where I need to be." When she did not agree to the decision, Max cancelled the wedding.

When he was 28, Max married Preciosa Silverio, who he had met when she was 16 years old. Preciosa's mother was daughter of Manila police captain Manuel Quiogue. She was 19 when Max proposed to her. They married in 1957 at the St. Anthony's Church in Singalong, Manila. Throughout their marriage, Max called Precious "Ifu" and "my Precious Silver," a play on her name. In 1966, Preciosa founded the Operation Brotherhood Montessori Center.

== Journalism career ==
Soliven began his career at 20 as associate editor of the Catholic newspaper The Sentinel, as police and political reporter for the Manila Chronicle at 25.

After returning to Manila, Max took a job in Procter and Gamble, which paid ₱500 a month, as a production manager for its factory in Velasquez, Tondo. He demanded for a "flex time" arrangement, which his boss accepted. Max would start earlier in the day and work late at night if needed, as he kept his afternoons free to teach in the Ateneo.

For a brief period, Max juggled his Procter and Gamble job with moonlighting at the Chronicle, before leaving Procter in late 1956 to be a full-time journalist, as he believed the corporate world was not meant for him.

=== Manila Chronicle ===
He claimed this opportunity back in 1954 when he bumped into one of his high school colleagues in Ateneo de Manila University, Oscar Lopez. At this time, Lopez was working with his father, Don Eugenio Lopez, who was currently the publisher of the Manila Chronicle. Oscar Lopez offered a job to Soliven in which he accepted. Max started out as a beat reporter under Enrique Santos, one of the legendary "terrors of Philippine journalism. He then got his break when Vergel Santos, one of the veteran news-writers of that time saw how Americanized he was and in turn, offered him to write an 11-part series on US economic and military assistance which was then featured on the front pages of the Chronicle in February 5–16, 1956. This helped earn him the National Press Club's Journalist of the Year Award of 1957. Soliven was popular with the editors because of his unique form of grammar and syntax when it comes to writing. This gave him the edge over the younger journalists of his time.

Max was chosen to be one of the Ten Outstanding Young Men (TOYM) of 1960 for journalism. Max then moved to The Manila Times, the nation's dominant paper.

=== The Manila Times ===
From 1957 to 1960, he would become the associate business editor to The Manila Times wherein he will finally be fully involved in the world of journalism. Because of his credentials back in his college years and because of his works in the Chronicle, the people of the Times were impressed by him, especially the publisher, Joaquin Roces.

=== The Evening News ===
In 1960, his receiving of the TOYM award caught the eye of Stonehill, which owned a newspaper called The Evening News. Max began there with a daily column entitled "A Word Edgewise" which the editors of the paper did not touch as per the deal requested by Max upon accepting his job there. At the age of 32, following the resignation of Fernando E.V. Sison as publisher, Soliven became the publisher and editor-in-chief of the now-defunct The Evening News, which rose in 1960 from sixth to second highest in daily circulation in the Philippines from being sixth on the year Max arrived there. Soliven again asserted himself demanding absolute editorial control with no interference from Stonehill, which was again accepted. He was only 32, and thus was called "the boy publisher" by Manila Daily Bulletin publisher Hans Menzi who was 51 at the time.

In 1961, as he always had an eye for foreign coverage, his request to cover Cuba was granted. He wrote an editorial published on April 26, 1961 after the failure of the Bay of Pigs writing "How can it (the US) maintain its position of pre-eminence, how can it retain the trust of the Free World, when it shows it is capable of such calamitous bungling?". Soliven would also produce an 11-part series from September 16 to 27, 1961 entitled "The Truth About Cuba", detailing the planning by the Central Intelligence Agency during the Eisenhower administration and execution of the Bay of Pigs by the Kennedy administration less than three month after assuming office.

Upon his return to the country, Max covered the 1961 presidential election between President Carlos P. Garcia and Vice President Diosdado Macapagal, and would solidify his being a political columnist around this time.

In 1962, Max left The Evening News after he found he had lost the full editorial policy he had asked for.

In June of that year, the Times announced that Max, along with his wife, ventured to Cambridge, Massachusetts to join the Kissinger program, which was a month's long worth of seminars, field trips, and discussion amongst the small group of 15 made up of legislators from Europe and newsmen from Japan who went along with Soliven.

He would spend the entirety of 1963 returning to Philippine developments before rejoining the Times the following year.

=== Return to The Manila Times ===
His passion for journalism drove him to the peaks of his career. In his stay with Times, he would ask to become an international correspondent, specifically to Southeast Asia, to build up on his portfolio as a journalist. His transfer to The Manila Times helped him a garner a wider audience and readership, doubling his numbers from Chronicle.

Alongside being a business editor, he would also write for magazines like Kislap-Graphic Magazine, where he was given his first weekly column entitled "The Roving Eye", the Philippines Free Press, and international publications like The New York Times and Newsweek, making him the American Media's top Filipino representative,. He would also become a columnist-on-air with the popular local radio station, DZFM alongside Melchie Aquino, who later be Philippine ambassador to West Germany. He also joined the opinions section in 1964. On February 3, 1964, The Manila Times first published Soliven's opinion column entitled "By The Way", which would go on to be his trademark column even in The Philippine Star.

One of his popular works with Manila Times would be his assignment in Saigon in Vietnam where he had his first direct experience with authoritarian rule, as Southeast Asian correspondent and "journalism consultant and special writer" for South Vietnam's Vietnam Presse. He used the money he earned from this to help fund his youngest sister, Ethel, as she would be leaving for New York of studies.

Soliven traveled to many of the notable global hotspots during the 1960s, such as the Vietnam War and the 1968 Tet Offensive therein; and the Gestapu Coup in Indonesia in 1965, in which half a million people were massacred. Soliven also earned an exclusive when he watched the detonation of the first atomic bomb in the People's Republic of China, where he also interviewed Premier Zhou Enlai on the matter. His work for the Times would also take him to places like Malaysia, Thailand, Burma, Hong Kong, Cambodia, Laos, and Japan.

=== Martial law era ===
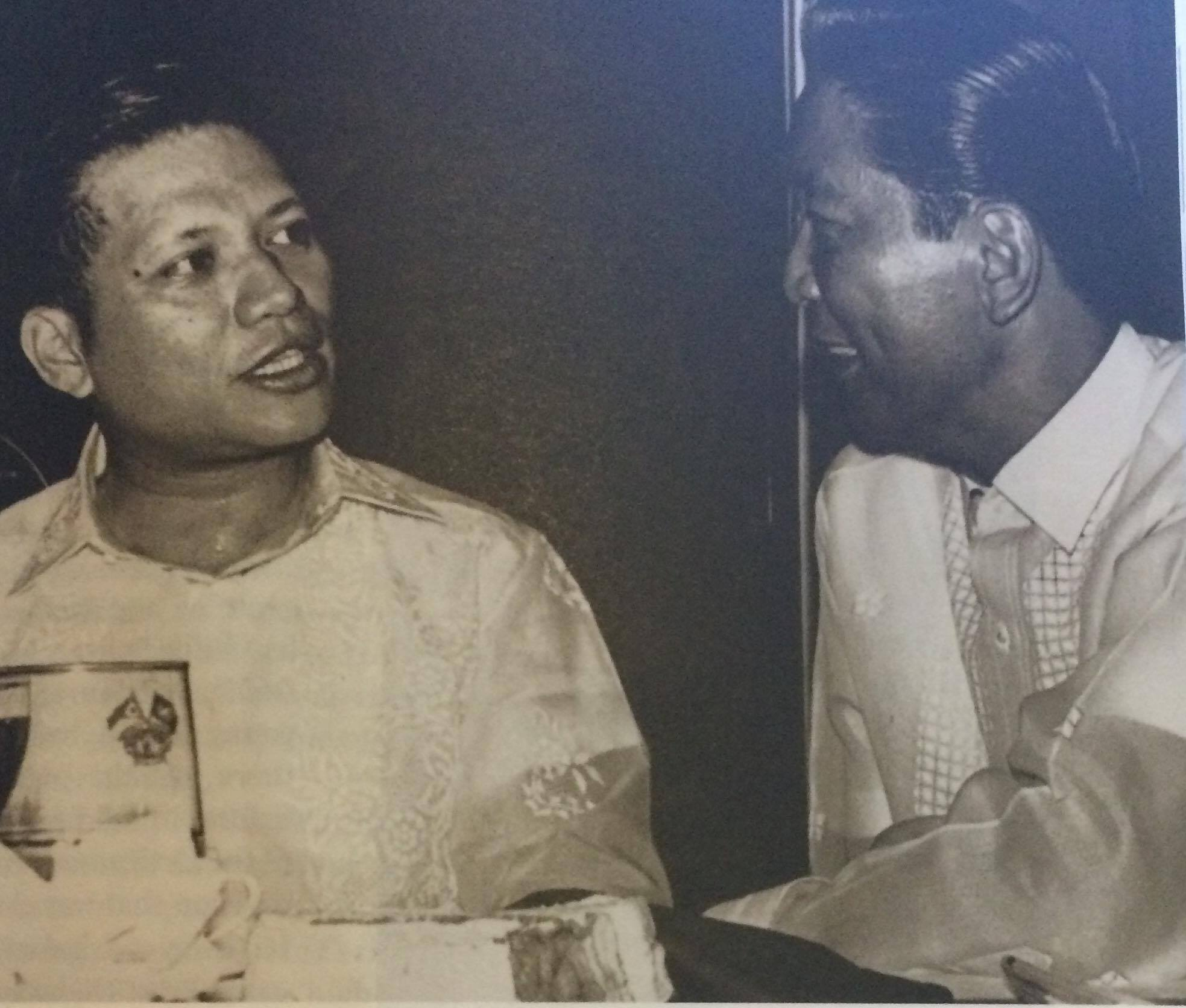
Maximo Soliven with Ferdinand Marcos, who will eventually have him imprisoned (from Maximo V. Soliven: The Man and the Journalist)

In Soliven's television show entitled Impact, he guested one of the greatest enemy of the Marcos regime, Benigno "Ninoy" Aquino. In his show, along with Lupita Concio, he was preparing for Aquino's arrival wherein they will talk about a top-secret military plan that would expose Marcos of his attempts to gain absolute power. This plan was called Oplan/Operation Sagittarius. In this plan, it would expose of the plans of martial law and what is to happen when it has been launched. Aquino wants to show this in Soliven's show (as it is also known for being one of the shows then to be anti-Marcos) because it would deliberately expose of Marcos filth. As planned, the show took place and Soliven talked about the said plan for three hours. Little did they know that Marcos was ahead in action already. Hours after the airing, Martial Law has already been declared. Because of the talk the two did, it would result to Soliven's imprisonment.

On September 23, 1972, at midnight, soldiers and guards have already swarmed the residences of people who have been against the Marcos regime. Soliven appears to be one of which. Numbers of soldiers have infiltrated the residence Soliven lives in, in Greenhills, San Juan. At 2 AM, the soldiers entered the home of the Soliven's and immediately captured Max. Among those imprisoned were Ninoy Aquino, Pepe Diokno, Chino Roces, Soc Rodrigo, Monching Mitra, Voltaire Garcia, and Jomari Velez. They were detained at Fort Bonifacio. 70 days after, he was released from probation and was let go, but with certain conditions. He was 43 at the time, and at the peak of his career.

Upon his release on December 3, 1972, the air of which from Fort Bonifacio up to Kennedy Street in the North Greenhills subdivision in which he resides was very different from what he expected. Songs hailing Marcos was everywhere and pro-Marcos propaganda was raised. His terms for release were discussed at his home. They were: weekly reports to Camp Crame, no travels outside Manila, no foreign travels for 7 years and was ordered to be put under Elizabeth Marcos-Keon's personal support to serve as his "baby-sitter."

Initially, he has lost all hope for writing. However, due to his passion, he has found his way to writing for a lifestyle and tourism magazine called Sunburst. He will be with this magazine company for five years until he is ready to once again write for politics against the regime of Marcos. Under the management of Soliven, the magazine has reached various peaks with editorials and topics regarding the history of the Philippines.

Years after, Sunburst has collapsed, leaving a depressed Soliven. Soon after, as eager as Soliven could be, he and his fellow accolades put up the Philippines first ever full-color magazine, Manila Magazine, which he would be a part of from 1980 to 1984. This would serve as a connection to where Sunburst has left off. He had a monthly column in Manila Magazine entitled "In This Corner", where he would write his tempered opinions on Marcos. He was also able to travel out of the country for the first time after this, going to Singapore to cover the inauguration of the new Changi Airport.

Throughout these years in the magazine industry, Soliven has been quiet with anything political related as it may result to him being executed. However, he continues his campaign against Marcos through criticisms in the magazine, a level or two below attack level. This would help him propagate his anti-Marcos movement. However, because of his beloved friend Ninoy Aquino, it led him to a full-blown against the dictator, as expressed in the People Power Revolution of 1986.

The death of Aquino signaled various catapults to change the Marcos-controlled media into a form of media that would ultimately help in overthrowing the regime. Since then, Soliven, along with his colleagues, started rebuilding the once-repressed Philippine press.

=== The Philippine Star ===
After his imprisonment during the martial law era, and after working with Starburst, Soliven was left with no other option. After the Times and his conundrum with Inquirer, they had no where else to go. Alongside his Inquirer colleague Betty Go-Belmonte, they were hesitant with building up another newspaper considering the competition they were in (Manila Bulletin ranking first and the Inquirer being second). Despite hesitation, they decided to run the business, with Go-Belmonte as chairman and Soliven as the publisher. This was the 23rd newspaper to ever come out in the said industry, according to Soliven. The tandem they had was harmonious because of mutual accommodation and the give-and-take relationship the two had formed.

On July 28, 1986, their first publication was released to the public. Being new to the game, only a few copies were printed. They were just eight pages long. According to Miguel Belmonte, what the tandem did was a "leap of faith" due to the inauspicious debut they did. Legitimacy and credibility to the Philippine Star happened when Soliven's popular column, "By The Way" made an appearance. Rivalry against the leading newspaper companies is then solidified. In a matter of months, the circulation of the star would reach 60,000, easily gaining third place in the newspaper industry. The rankings would then stabilize and would remain the same for the following years. Throughout the years, the newspaper would be gaining income because of the strategy the tandem had. They would avoid the circulation problem that was occurring then due to low selling price and high manufacturing cost.

Soliven would then be the publisher of the newspaper until his death. He would see that the newspaper would rank second in the Philippines in readership, circulation, and advertising.

== Death ==
After garnering many accolades in Philippine journalism, Soliven died at age 77 in Tokyo, Japan on November 24, 2006. He suffered a fatal acute and pulmonary cardiac arrest at the Narita airport. He was pronounced dead at 11:26AM (Tokyo Time/10:26AM,Manila time) November 24, 2006, at the Narita Red Cross Hospital. The confirmation was brought about by consul Gina Jamoralin of the Philippine embassy in Japan. He died doing what he loved: being a journalist. He wrote his last article hours before his death regarding the rise of a more-assertive prime minister, Shinzo Abe. Bookie Soliven, son of second eldest brother, Willie, may have been the last person Max texted before he died. Max replied to Bookie's invitation to watch a Warner Brothers film premiere replying, "Thank you for your invite. I will be back from Tokyo on the 27th. Love, Uncle Max."

After his death was confirmed, various companies reacted. CNN announced his passing worldwide. Various newspaper companies mourned the death of one of the greatest journalists of the time. The Inquirer referred to him as its "founding publisher" in the article announcing his death. The Philippine Flag at O.B. Montessori Center, the school founded by his wife Preciosa, was on half-mast. His remains were cremated in Tokyo, Japan, and were brought home to Manila by his wife Preciosa on November 28 (The Philippine Star, November 29), with full military honors (in recognition of his military service during World War II). He was buried in Libingan ng mga Bayani on January 10, 2007. Soliven was posthumously awarded the Order of Lakandula (rank of Grand Officer) by President Gloria Macapagal Arroyo. She also hailed Max Soliven as an "icon of freedom" saying that free press wouldn't have been the way it was without him.

== See also ==
- Soliven's last opinion article published in The Philippine Star
