= Ethel Soliven Timbol =

Filipino journalist (1940–2020)

- Born: Ethelinda Villaflor Soliven; January 22, 1940; Manila, Philippine Islands, U.S.
- Died: September 6, 2020 (aged 80); Taguig, Philippines
- Education: University of Mount Saint Vincent
- Occupation: Journalist

Ethel Soliven Timbol (born Ethelinda Villaflor Soliven; 22 January 1940 – September 6, 2020) was a Filipina journalist and lifestyle editor of the Manila Bulletin, published in the Philippines. She was the ninth child of Congressman Benito Soliven and Pelagia Villaflor Soliven. She was the youngest sister of journalist Maximo V. Soliven.

She finished High School at St. Theresa's College in Manila. After two years of college at St. Theresa's, she left to study at the College of Mount Saint Vincent in Riverdale, New York, U.S.A. on a Knights of Columbus scholarship. She majored in English and Child Psychology.

Timbol joined the Manila Bulletin in 1960, handling the police beat at the Western Police District, which at that time included then patrolman, and later Manila Mayor Alfredo Lim. Aside from her reportorial beat, she was tapped to edit the Youth section, "The Page for the Young at Heart."

She has also been assigned to the beats covering the Department of Education, Trade and Industry, and the Commission on Elections, often meriting front-page stories in the tumultuous '60s and '70s.

In 1976, she was appointed editor of the "Life & Leisure" and "Sunday Leisure" sections of the same newspaper. Apart from her editorial duties, she was a respected columnist, writing the twice weekly society column "Pacesetters," and the once weekly "Consumers' Observation Post," a consumer advocacy column, which she started with Deedee Sytangco.

In 1991, she received a special citation from the Manila Rotary Club for her consumer advocacy work.

She was a cancer survivor, recovering from colorectal cancer.

She retired from the Manila Bulletin on December 31, 2007, after 47 years of service.

On September 6 2020, she died at St. Luke's Hospital in BGC. She was 80 years old.

== Quotes ==
When asked about the difference between young people today and young people before, she replied: "The young people before called me Ethel, today they call me Ma'am."

"I always mean what I say when I say it. That may change later."

== Trivia ==
She is the widely acknowledged "Dean of Philippine Lifestyle Editors."

The original caricature for her Pacesetters column included a cigarette in a long stemmed holder. When she stopped smoking in 1995, she asked that the cigarette be removed from the caricature.

The Life and Leisure and Sunday Leisure sections of Timbol generated the most advertising revenue for the Manila Bulletin.
