= Noreen Culhane =

American businesswoman

Noreen M. Culhane
- Born: September 8, 1950 (age 75); New York City, United States
- Education: College of Mount Saint Vincent; College of New Rochelle
- Employer: NYSE Euronext
- Title: Executive Vice President
- Website: About the NYSE

Noreen M. Culhane is an American businesswoman and current executive vice president of the New York Stock Exchange, directing their Global Corporate Client Group. Culhane also manages the Exchange's initial public offering process and their worldwide efforts to attract new listings. Additionally, she serves as an executive vice president of Pep Boys, director of Mutual of America Capital Management and director of the Marco Polo Network.

== Biography ==
Culhane is the eldest of seven children born to Irish immigrants from Ballylongford, County Kerry. She was an entrant from New York at the 1970 Rose of Tralee pageant.

She graduated from the University of Mount Saint Vincent in 1972 and earned a graduate degree in special education from the College of New Rochelle. She attended the six-week Advanced Management Program at Harvard Business School.

Before joining the NYSE, Culhane spent 20 years at IBM, most recently as the Business Unit Executive for the securities industry. Her responsibilities in this position included sales, services and relationship management for major domestic securities firms. Immediately after college, she spent five years as a teacher in the Catholic schools of Westchester County, New York.

Culhane serves on the Management Committee for the NYSE and is a member of The Economic Club of New York. She also serves on the Fund Raising Board of the Borough of Manhattan Community College as well as the Board of the College of Mount Saint Vincent.
