= Ron Scapp =

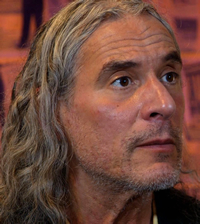
- Born: June 29, 1955 (age 71); New York City, NY
- Occupations: Educator, author

Ron Scapp is a noted American educator and author. His work focuses on urban education, educational leadership and policy, and teacher empowerment. He also writes on topics as varied as homelessness, American theater and continental philosophy.

== Career ==
Dr. Ron Scapp is the founding director of the Graduate Program in Urban and Multicultural Education at the College of Mount Saint Vincent in the Bronx, where he is professor of humanities and teacher education. He also is a fellow of the National Education Policy Center at University of Colorado, Boulder, a member of the Education Policy Alliance and a senior associate and founding member of the United Federation of Teacher's Urban Educators Forum in New York City. He is also a member of the NYC/UFT Teacher Center policy board. Dr. Scapp served as President of the Association For Ethnic Studies (then called the National Association for Ethnic Studies) from 2011 to 2015 and is Editor of Ethnic Studies Review.

Dr. Scapp has Ph.D. in philosophy from the State University of New York at Stony Brook, where he studied continental philosophy, the history of philosophy and concentrated on race, class and gender issues. He is a founding member of Group Thought, a philosophy collective based in Red Hook, Brooklyn.

Ron Scapp continues to explore and expand the connections to be made among education, politics and culture.

== Publications and Work ==
- Teaching Values: Critical Perspectives on Education, Politics and Cultural (Routledge, 2003).
- Managing to be Different: Educational Leadership as Critical Practice (Routledge, 2006).
- Eating Culture (Co-Editor with Brian Seitz), SUNY, 1998.
- Etiquette: Reflections on Contemporary Comportment (Co-Editor with Brian Seitz), SUNY Press, 2007.
- Fashion Statements: On Style, Appearance and Reality (Co-Editor with Brian Seitz) Palgrave, 2010.
- Living With Class: Philosophical Reflections on Identity and Material Culture (Co-Editor with Brian Seitz) Palgrave 2013.
- Dialogue With Teachers (Series Editor) United Federation of Teachers/Teacher Center Publication.
- Hot Topics: Contemporary Philosophy and Culture (Series Co-Editor with Brian Seitz) SUNY Press.
- Positions: Education, Politics and Culture (Series Co-Editor with Kenneth J. Saltman) Routledge.

Praising his 2006 publication, Managing to be Different: Educational Leadership as Critical Practice, Henry A. Giroux notes that Ron Scapp

“Offers a view of educational leadership that is as empowering as it is insightful… Scapp develops a theory of leadership that is not only empowering and critical but takes seriously the relationship between leadership and the imperatives of a substantive democracy. Every educator as well as everyone interested in education should read this book.”

In addition, he has collaborated with many other scholars, most notably with writer and critic bell hooks in her 1994 publication Teaching to Transgress: Education as the practice of freedom.
