= Brian Cassin =

Irish businessman, the CEO of Experian

- Born: Brian Jude Cassin; September 1967 (age 58); Dublin, Ireland
- Education: Trinity College, Dublin
- Occupations: CEO, Experian
- Board member of: Experian; Sainsbury's
- Children: 2

Brian Jude Cassin (born September 1967) is an Irish businessman, the CEO of Experian.

Cassin was born in Dublin in September 1967. He is a graduate of Trinity College, Dublin.

He is the CEO of Experian, board member since 16 July 2014, when he was the CFO, and a non-executive director of Sainsbury's.

Cassin previously held senior roles at Baring Brothers International and the London Stock Exchange and was a managing director of the investment bank Greenhill & Co.

Cassin is married with two children.
