= Jonny Oates, Baron Oates =

British Liberal Democrat politician

The Right Honourable The Lord Oates
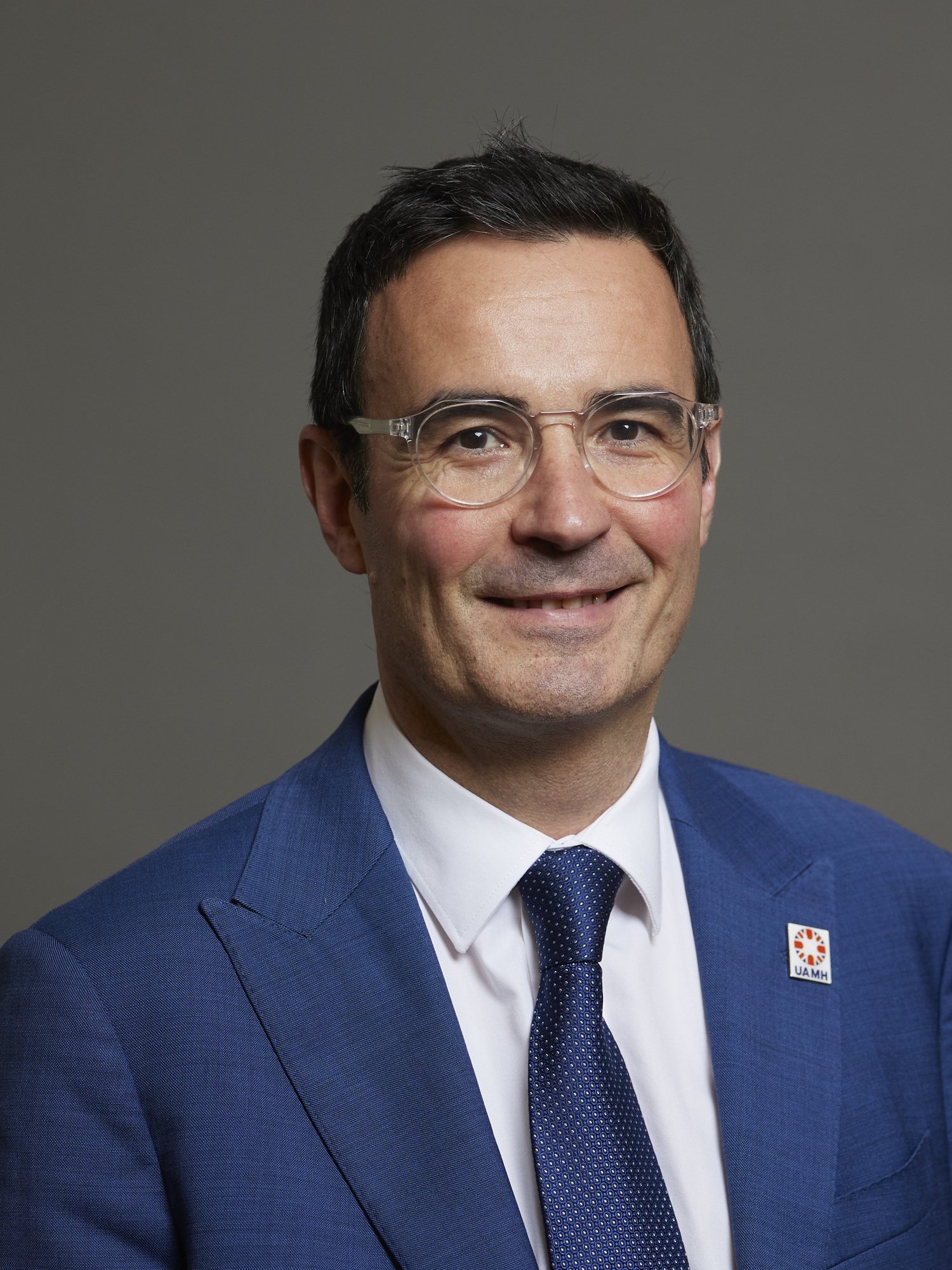
- Official portrait, 2023

Member of the House of Lords
- Lord Temporal
- Life peerage 5 October 2015

Personal details
- Born: Jonathan Oates
- Party: Liberal Democrats
- Spouse: David Hill
- Occupation: Chief of Staff to Nick Clegg

Jonathan Oates, Baron Oates (born 28 December 1969) is a British Liberal Democrat politician and member of the House of Lords. A past chief of staff to the former deputy prime minister of the United Kingdom, Nick Clegg, he was previously the director of policy and communications at the Liberal Democrats.

== Early life ==
Oates' father is the Reverend Canon John Oates, formerly rector of St Bride's Church on Fleet Street.

Oates studied at Marlborough College and the University of Exeter.

== Career ==
Oates began his career as an account manager at political and media relations firm Westminster Strategy. In 1994, he stood as a Liberal Democrat councillor for Grove ward in the Royal Borough of Kingston-upon-Thames. During his time as a councillor, he served as Deputy Leader, helped create a structure for giving power to local residents, and gained national exposure for proposing a conference motion on council control over the National Health Service. Oates remained in local and national politics, serving as an election agent for Edward Davey, a winning candidate at the 1997 General Election.

In 1999, Oates took a position at the Westminster Foundation for Democracy where he was assigned to a role as a political and media adviser to the Inkatha Freedom Party in the South African Parliament, advising Home Affairs Minister Mangosuthu Buthelezi and Reverend Musa Zondi.

Oates returned to the UK in 2001 as a policy and communications co-ordinator at the Youth Justice Board, advising chairman Lord Warner. He also became an associate at Mark Bolland & Associates, the public affairs company set up by Deputy Private Secretary to the Prince of Wales, Mark Bolland. In 2004 Oates became a director at Bell Pottinger Public Affairs. He was later appointed as director of policy and communications for the Liberal Democrats and in 2009 was given the role of director of General Election communications for the 2010 General Election.

After the formation of the coalition government, Oates was appointed deputy communications adviser to Prime Minister David Cameron and in August 2010 became Chief of Staff to Deputy Prime Minister Nick Clegg.

In 2010, Oates stood as a Liberal Democrat candidate for the safe Conservative seat of Coombe Hill on Kingston upon Thames Council and was rated by the Daily Telegraph in September 2010 as the fifth "most influential" Liberal Democrat. He was created a life peer on 5 October 2015, taking the title Baron Oates, of Denby Grange in the County of West Yorkshire.

== Personal life ==
In 2006, Oates entered into a civil partnership with David Hill.

Orders of precedence in the United Kingdom
Preceded by The Lord Lansley	Gentlemen; Baron Oates	Followed by The Lord Lupton
