= Yvonne Spigt =

Dutch skater

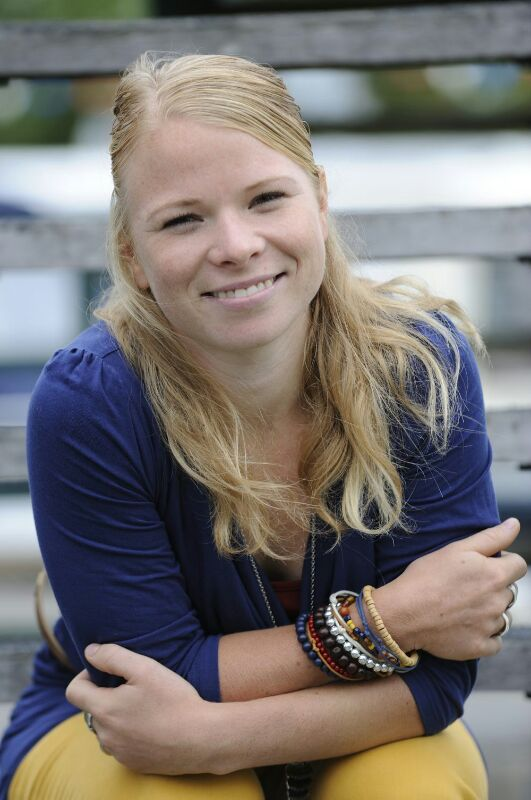
- Yvonne Spigt

Personal information
- Born: 20 January 1988 (age 38) Wervershoof, Netherlands

Sport
- Country: Netherlands
- Sport: Speed skating

Yvonne Spigt (born 20 January 1988) was a Dutch marathon skater and inline skater. She also works as a doctor's assistant. Her sisters Moniek, Petra and Jannitta have also skated in women's marathons. Spigt won the Dutch Open championships marathon skating on natural ice at the Weissensee on 30 January 2008. She later also won the Open Dutch Championship marathon skating on natural ice at the Grote Rietplas in Emmen on 8 February 2012.

Yvonne Spigt skated marathons in the Dutch Top Division from 2007 to 2016 with the following teams: Foekens (2007–2009), Viks Parket (2009–2011), Beteropenhaardhout.nl (BOHH) (2011–2012), Steigerplank.com (2012–2015) and Koga (2015–2016), after which she retired.
