= Robert F. Greenhill =

American businessman

Robert F. Greenhill (born 1936) is an American businessman, widely credited with helping pioneer the modern mergers and acquisitions advisory business on Wall Street. He is the founder and chairman of Greenhill & Co., an investment bank headquartered in New York City that has advised on $3 trillion worth of transactions and operates in 17 offices globally. In May 2023, Japanese conglomerate Mizuho acquired Greenhill &Co. for $550 million in an all cash transaction.

== Early life and education ==
Greenhill was born in 1936 in Minneapolis, Minnesota. He graduated from Yale University in 1958 with a BA in Philosophy, and he received an MBA from the Harvard Business School (HBS) in 1962, where he was a Baker Scholar.

== Career ==
He joined investment bank Morgan Stanley in 1962 and became a partner in 1970. In 1972, he was appointed by Frank Petito, then Chairman of Morgan Stanley, to create and direct the new mergers and acquisitions department, the first of its kind on Wall Street. During this time, he was credited with pioneering the modern investment banking analyst program. In the 1980s, he served on the investment banks' management committee, then, from January 1989 to January 1999, he was its Vice Chairman. From January 1991 to June 1993, he was President.

From 1993 to 1996, he left Morgan Stanley to become the Chairman and Chief Executive Officer of Smith Barney, a subsidiary of The Travelers Companies, where he served on the board of directors of the latter.

Greenhill suddenly departed in 1996, due to internal company disagreements and went on to found his own investment bank, Greenhill & Co., later the same year. He was its Chief Executive Officer from its foundation until 2007, when he retired from the role. Greenhill served as the company's Chairman from 1996 to 2018, and served on the board for over two decades from 1996 to 2021. He has remained Chairman Emeritus and senior adviser to the company after that.

He has served for many years on the board of trustees of the American Enterprise Institute (AEI) and has been a member of the Kappa Beta Phi society since 1985.

== Personal life ==
Robert was married to Gayle (nee Gussett) Greenhill in September 1958 in her hometown of Des Moines, Iowa and they remained married until her death on October 12, 2017. They moved to Boston when Robert attended HBS and then in 1962, moved to New York which became their home town as Robert started his career on Wall Street. They had three children, and instilled into the family their sense of adventure. In 1975, the two were dropped together with four others by an airplane at the Arctic Circle to spend a month traveling north with three canoes for 500 miles without guides from Beechey Lake in Nunavut, Canada on the Back river through to the Arctic Ocean. That trip made them subjects of a DuPont advertisement in 1977 touting Kevlar-skinned canoes. They later took their children on similar trips to the far north. In addition, Robert had a pilot's license with more than 15,000 hours logged in command over 20 years, flying all over the world, often accompanied by his wife, who eventually got her own pilot’s license at age 50.

They were both very involved with the HBS alumni, and their three children and their spouses are all graduates of the school. Greenhill’s many contributions to HBS include service on the School’s Visiting Committee and Centennial Global Business Summit Steering Committee, as well as leading roles in reunion fundraising. In addition to the family’s support for global research, in 1987 Greenhill endowed the Robert F. Greenhill Award, given annually by the HBS Dean to members of the HBS community who contribute to HBS in significant ways. In 2003, HBS named a building on campus "The Greenhill House" (formerly Humphrey House) in their honor, in appreciation of a significant gift, first major gift of its kind, that established the Gayle and Robert F. Greenhill Family Endowment for Global Research that provides permanent funding to support the School’s international research and course development activities. Currently the building provides administrative space for the HBS Global Initiative, which was launched in 1996 to deepen the School’s long-standing focus on international course development and research by facilitating closer ties with companies, academic institutions, and alumni worldwide. In 2009, Greenhill received the HBS Alumni Achievement Award, given to alums who have contributed significantly to their companies and communities.

Greenhill's wife Gayle was a trustee of the International Center of Photography from1985 to 2016, serving as Chair of the Board from 2001 to 2008 and had also served on the New York's Museum of Modern Art (MoMa) photography committee for more than two decades from 1989 to 2013. After her death, Robert donated to MoMa in her memory more than 300 photographs from her collection, intending it to stand as a memorial to a figure with a long commitment to supporting photography. The collection includes works by 103 artists, among them giants of photography, including Frank, Edward Steichen, Diane Arbus, Cindy Sherma, William Eggleston, László Moholy-Nagy, André Kertesz, Charles Sheeler, Imogen Cunningham, In addition to masterworks by established figures, the Greenhills collected a wide variety of documentary and press photography, much of it unattributed. These include many photographs taken during World War II—some by Steichen’s photography corps—and the Korean and Vietnam wars. The Greenhills had a keen interest in exploration, collecting extensively in the areas of early aviation, including photographs of the Wright Brothers’ foundational experiments (1903–1911), and the golden age of Antarctic exploration (1910– 1915), including a comprehensive set of prints by Herbert Ponting documenting Robert F. Scott’s disastrous expedition to the Antarctic.
