= James Lupton, Baron Lupton =

British peer (born 1955)

The Right Honourable The Lord Lupton CBE
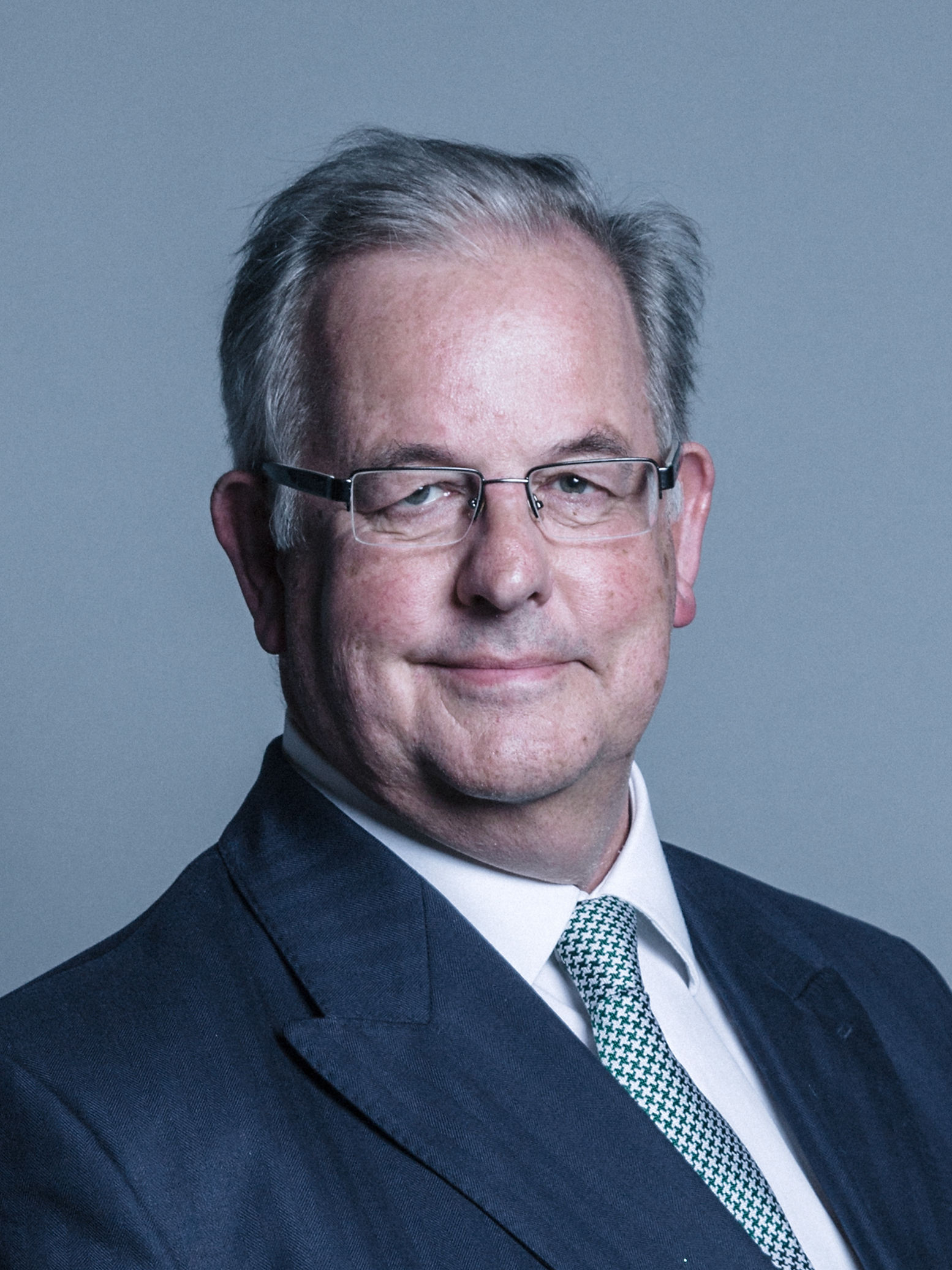
- official parliamentary portrait

Member of the House of Lords
- Lord Temporal
- Life peerage 6 October 2015

Personal details
- Born: 15 June 1955 (age 71)
- Known for: Former Chairman of Greenhill Europe and Co-Treasurer of the Conservative Party

James Roger Crompton Lupton, Baron Lupton, CBE (born 15 June 1955) is a former chairman of Greenhill Europe and Co-Treasurer of the Conservative Party, having donated circa £3.3 million to the party.

He was created a life peer taking the title Baron Lupton, of Lovington in the County of Hampshire on 6 October 2015.

He was educated at Sedbergh School and Lincoln College, Oxford. He was previously Deputy Chairman of Baring Brothers International Ltd until the bank collapsed in 1995.

Lupton was appointed Commander of the Order of the British Empire (CBE) in the 2012 New Year Honours.

In 2016, then prime minister David Cameron re-appointed Lupton to the board of the British Museum for a further four-year term, ending 11 June 2020.

Since July 2019, Lupton has sat in the House of Lords as a non-affiliated peer. However, he reportedly votes with the Conservative party bloc.

He is estimated to be worth £130 million. Lupton is also a member of Brooks's and the London Capital Club.

Orders of precedence in the United Kingdom
Preceded by The Lord Oates	Gentlemen; Baron Lupton	Followed by The Lord Foster of Bath
