= Simon Borrows =

British investment banker (born 1959)

- Born: 24 January 1959 (age 67); Taplow, Buckinghamshire, England
- Education: Rossall School; Queen Mary University of London; London Business School
- Occupations: Investment banker, business executive
- Title: CEO of 3i (2012-present)
- Spouse: Sally Ann Weston (m. 1987)
- Children: 3

Simon Borrows (born 24 January 1959) is a British investment banker. He is the former head of mergers & acquisitions at Barings Bank and the former chairman of the investment bank Greenhill & Co. Since 2012, he has served as the chief executive of the private equity and venture capital firm 3i.

== Early life ==
Simon Borrows was born on 24 January 1959 in Taplow, Buckinghamshire, England. His father was Kenneth Ambrose Borrows and his mother, Ailsa Nancy Borrows.

Borrows was educated at the Rossall School. He graduated from the Queen Mary University of London, where he earned an LL.B, and he earned a master in business administration from the London Business School in 1985.

== Career ==
Borrows worked for HSBC in Hong Kong from 1980 to 1983, followed by Morgan, Grenfell & Co from 1985 to 1988, and Barings Bank from 1988 to 1998, where he was the head of mergers & acquisitions from 1995 to 1998. He joined Greenhill & Co. as a founding partner of the London office in 1998. He was its co-president from 2004 to 2007, its co-chief executive from 2007 to 2010, and the chairman of Greenhill & Co. International from 2010 to 2011. According to The Independent, he "turned Greenhill, once a small, specialist US-based investment bank, into a major player in Europe's M&A market."

Borrows was principal external advisor to 3i, a private equity and venture capital company, from 1994 to 2004. In that capacity, he advised 3i on its listing on the London Stock Exchange in 1994. He became an executive director and its chief investment officer in October 2011. In that capacity, he led the acquisition of Action for £114 million. Since 17 May 2012 he has served as its chief executive officer. He continues to be an executive director, and he serves on its group risk committee, its executive committee and its investment committee.

Borrows served on the board of directors of Inchcape plc from 2011 to 2015. He also served as a non-executive director of British Land from 2011 to 17 July 2017.

== Personal life ==
Borrows married Sally Ann Weston in 1987. They have a son and two daughters. He is a member of the Queenwood Golf Club in Ottershaw and the St George's Hill Golf Club in Weybridge.

Business positions
Preceded by Michael Queen	CEO of 3i 2012–present	Incumbent
