= Nigel MacEwan =

American investment banker (1933–2019)

Nigel S. MacEwan
- Born: Nigel Savage MacEwan; March 21, 1933
- Died: October 25, 2019 (aged 86); New Canaan, Connecticut, U.S.
- Education: Yale University (BA); Harvard University (MBA)
- Occupations: Former Chairman and CEO, Kleinwort Benson North America

Nigel Savage MacEwan (March 21, 1933 – October 25, 2019) was an American investment banker who served as chairman and chief executive of Kleinwort Benson North America from 1987 to 1993. Prior to Kleinwort Benson, he was the president of investment banking and co-chairman of private equity at Merrill Lynch from 1978 to 1987 and the president of White Weld & Co. and its subsidiary Credit Suisse White Weld from 1977 to 1978, when the firm merged with Merrill Lynch.

== Early life ==
Nigel S. MacEwan was born on March 21, 1933. His father was an Episcopal priest.

MacEwan graduated from Yale University magna cum laude in 1955 and received an MBA at Harvard Business School in 1959.

== Business career ==
After graduating from Harvard Business School, he began his career as an associate at Morgan Stanley before moving to White Weld in 1962, where he would eventually be named president. At White Weld, MacEwan's most prominent deal was the IPO of Wal-Mart Stores in 1970, alongside Stephens Inc. In 1978, White Weld merged with Merrill Lynch and MacEwan was named head of the investment bank and co-chairman of Merrill Lynch - White Weld Capital Partners, a $400 million private equity fund.

In 1987, MacEwan left Merrill to join Kleinwort Benson, a British investment and merchant banking firm, where he was named chairman and chief executive of its U.S. operations.

MacEwan was a board member at different times of Merrill Lynch, Kleinwort Benson, and the New York branch of the Securities Industry and Financial Markets Association. He was also an adjust professor of business and finance at New York University Stern School of Business from 1973 to 1975.

MacEwan was a member of Kappa Beta Phi.

== Personal life and death ==
MacEwan married Judith Sperry, the granddaughter of Sperry Corporation founder Elmer Ambrose Sperry on September 2, 1995. His previous two marriages ended in divorce. MacEwan and his wife resided primarily in New Canaan, Connecticut, but they also maintained a home in Islesboro, Maine. He died in New Canaan on October 25, 2019, at the age of 86.
