= Charles L. Flynn Jr. =

Charles L. Flynn Jr. is a former president of the College of Mount Saint Vincent, serving from 2000 to 2021. Prior to working at the College of Mount Saint Vincent, Flynn served as Provost of Assumption College in Massachusetts.

Flynn received a bachelor's degree from Hamilton College where he was a member of Phi Beta Kappa. He earned his M.A. and Ph.D. in history from Duke University. Flynn's scholarly works include "White Land, Black Labor: Caste and Class in Late Nineteenth-Century Georgia" and a co-edited book, Race, Class, and Politics in Southern History. The latter work was named an outstanding book on human rights by the Gustavus Myers Center in 1990. In 1999, while at Assumption College, he was initiated into Omicron Delta Kappa honor society.

Flynn retired in 2021, and was named President Emeritus of the College of Mount Saint Vincent.
