= Joseph Morrison Skelly =

American historian

Joseph Morrison Skelly is an American scholar, Professor of History at the University of Mount Saint Vincent in Riverdale, New York, and a retired United States Army officer.

== Academic career ==
Skelly's education includes a BA from the University of Notre Dame and an MA and PhD from University College Dublin. He was a Rotary Foundation International Graduate Scholar at Queen's University in Belfast. He has published numerous books, including Political Islam from Muhammad to Ahmadinejad: Defenders, Detractors, and Definitions; the volume Ideas Matter: Essays in Honor of Conor Cruise O'Brien; Irish Foreign Policy, 1919-66: From Independence to Internationalism; and Irish Diplomacy at the United Nations, 1945-65: National Interests and the International Order. He has written articles for scholarly journals in North America, Europe, and Israel on a wide range of topics, including international terrorism, radical Islam, military affairs, and diplomatic history. He has published essays on similar themes in The Washington Times, National Review Online, United Press International, Irish Independent, and The Belfast Telegraph. He is treasurer of the Association for the Study of the Middle East and Africa and a writing fellow with the Middle East Forum. He was an academic fellow with the Foundation for the Defense of Democracies from 2003 to 2007. He served as an editorial advisor to Robert McCartney, Member of the British Parliament and leader of the UK/Unionist Party, from 2000 to 2002.

== Military Service ==
Joseph Skelly is a retired U.S. Army officer. He served in the United States Army Reserve from 2001 to 2021 and in the United States Army National Guard from 1996 to 2000. He held a range of command, staff, and operational positions. He completed a tour of duty in Operation Iraqi Freedom, where he was stationed in the city of Baquba in Diyala Province, northeast of Bagdad on the edge of the Sunni Triangle. His major military awards include the Bronze Star, the Combat Action Badge, the Iraq Campaign Medal, the Meritorious Service Medal, the Army Commendation Medal, the Army Achievement Medal, and the Army Service Medal for being deployed during the COVID pandemic in 2020. He was the recipient of the General Douglas MacArthur Leadership Award in 2016; he was the honor graduate of Army training and development courses at Fort Benning, GA, Fort Leonard Wood, MO, and Fort Sam Houston, TX; and he received the Commanding General's award for the highest score on the record Army Physical Fitness Test at the latter two locations.
