= Zwaagdijk-West =

- Village
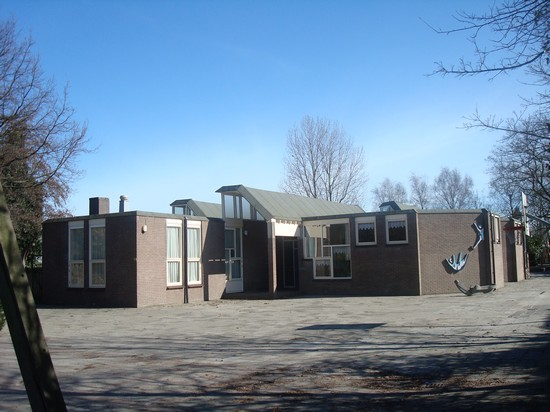
- School

- Flag

- Location in the Netherlands Location in the province of North Holland in the Netherlands
- Coordinates: 52°40′33″N 5°3′33″E
- Country: Netherlands
- Province: North Holland
- Municipality: Medemblik

Area
  - Village: 1.52 km^{2} (0.59 sq mi)
- Elevation: −1.5 m (−4.9 ft)

Population (2025)
  - Village: 605
  - Density: 398/km^{2} (1,030/sq mi)
  - Urban: 445
  - Rural: 165
- Time zone: UTC+1 (CET)
  - Summer (DST): UTC+2 (CEST)
- Postal code: 1685
- Dialing code: 0228

Zwaagdijk-West (Dutch pronunciation: [ˈzʋaːɣdɛik ˈʋɛst]) is a village in the Dutch province of North Holland. It is a part of the municipality of Medemblik, and lies about 3 km north of Hoorn.

The village was first mentioned in 1319 as buten den Zuoechdyc, and means "the dike belonging to Zwaag. Zwaagdijk-Oost is the settlement on the eastern side of the dike, Zwaagdijk-West is on the western side. In 1929, the Catholic Jacobus de Meerdere Church was built in Zwaagdijk-West.
