= Gail Dinter-Gottlieb =

Canadian academic administrator

Gail Dinter-Gottlieb is an American university administrator who served as the 14th president and vice-chancellor of Acadia University until February 2008.

A native of Port Chester, New York, Dinter-Gottlieb was educated at the College of Mount Saint Vincent, Northeastern University, Weizmann Institute of Science, and the Harvard Graduate School of Education.

Dinter-Gottlieb's research and scholarly activities include work on self-cleavage of the Tetrahymena intron with Nobel Laureate Dr. Thomas R. Cech (1989). Her recent focus has been in the application of biotechnology to the study of HIV/AIDS and hepatitis.

She was a teacher and science curriculum specialist in Massachusetts' Brookline School System. In 1976 she taught at the American International School in Kfar Shmaryahu, Israel. She was a postdoctoral fellow at the University of Colorado and taught at Drexel University from 1986 to 1996 and 1997–2003 at State University of New York College at Buffalo and Pace University.

Dinter-Gottlieb assumed the presidency of Acadia University on September 1, 2003. On January 4, 2008, she tendered her resignation as president and Vice-Chancellor of Acadia, effective February 29, 2008, before the completion of her first term.

During her tenure, Acadia built a new Biology building and Learning Commons, $52 million was raised in the Capital Campaign, and the faculty went on strike twice. They were the first and last faculty strikes in the university's history.

She currently serves National Executive Director of the American Society of the University of Haifa.

== See also ==
- List of Canadian university leaders
