= University of Mount Saint Vincent =

Catholic university in New York City, New York

- Former names: Academy of Mount Saint Vincent (1847–1911); College of Mount Saint Vincent (1911–2023)
- Motto: Bonitatem et disciplinam et scientiam doce me.
- Motto in English: "Teach me goodness and discipline and knowledge."
- Type: Private university
- Established: 1847; 179 years ago
- Religious affiliation: Roman Catholic (Sisters of Charity of New York)
- Academic affiliations: ACCU; CIC; NAICU
- Endowment: $62 million
- President: Susan Burns
- Students: 3,202 (2023)
- Undergraduates: 2,398 (2023)
- Postgraduates: 804 (2023)
- Location: Riverdale, Bronx, New York City, New York, U.S. 40.9135°N 73.9085°W
- Campus: Urban
- Colors: White, gold
- Nickname: Dolphins
- Sporting affiliations: NCAA Division III – Skyline
- Mascot: Dolphin
- Website: mountsaintvincent.edu

The University of Mount Saint Vincent (UMSV) is a private Catholic university in New York City, United States. It was founded in 1847 by the Sisters of Charity of New York.

The university serves over 1,800 students with professional undergraduate programs in nursing, business, communication, and education and graduate degree programs in nursing, physician assistant, business, TESOL, and education. It is under the auspices of the Sisters of Charity of New York, one of several Sisters of Charity congregations of Catholic women that trace their lineage back to Saint Elizabeth Ann Seton.

== History ==
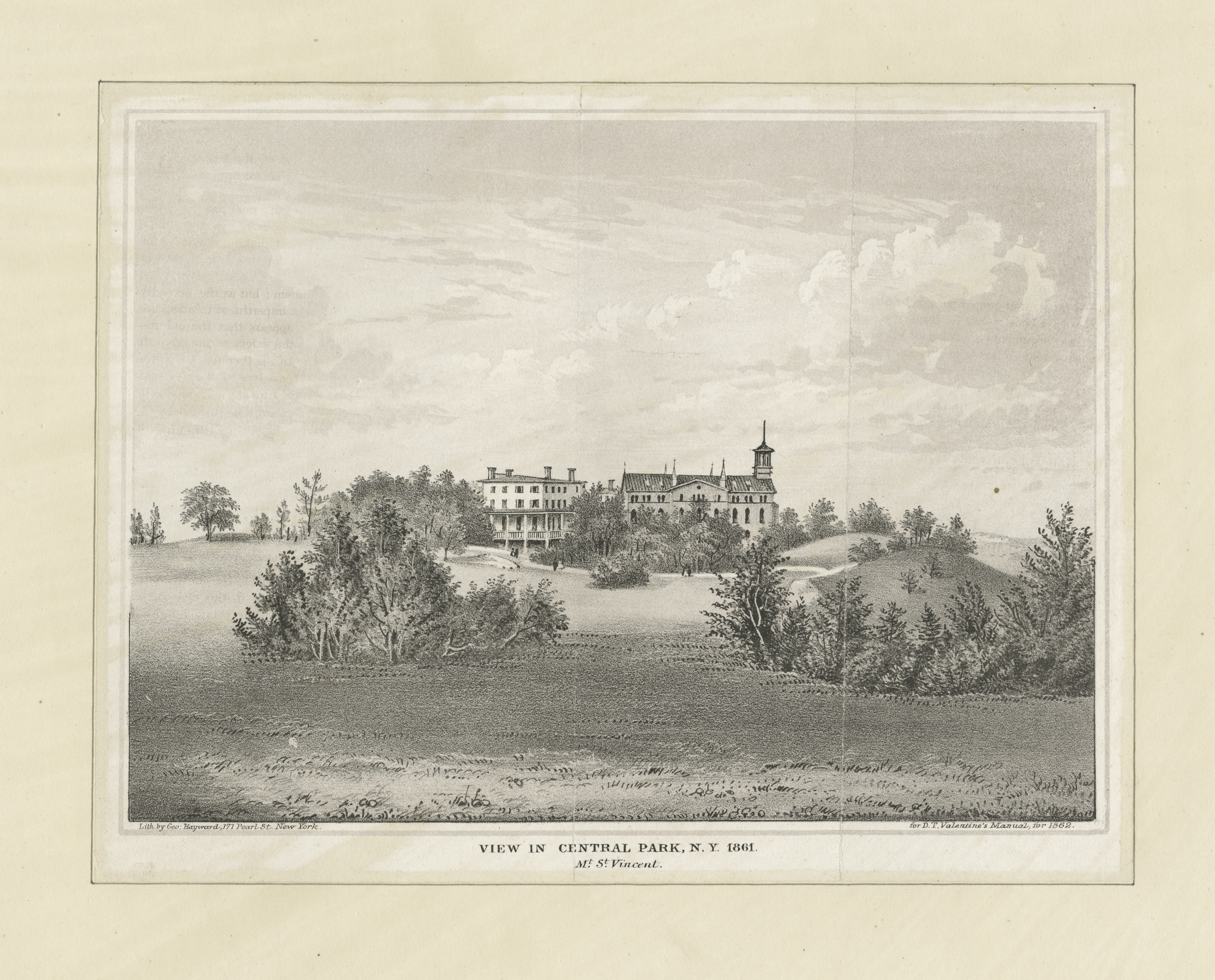
1861 in Central Park

The university was founded in 1847 as the Academy of Mount Saint Vincent, a school for women. It took its name from Saint Vincent de Paul, the 17th-century French priest who worked with the poor and founded the original Sisters of Charity, and from the geographic high point along Fifth Avenue in Manhattan known as McGowan's Pass.

In 1911, the academy became a degree-granting institution and changed its name to the College of Mount Saint Vincent. In 2024, the college was renamed the University of Mount Saint Vincent.

== Campus buildings ==
=== Fonthill Castle ===
The castle housed the university's library from 1942 to 1968. Fonthill once formed the architectural symbol of the university and housed the Office of Admissions and Financial Aid. It was listed on the National Register of Historic Places in 1980. Fonthill is currently vacant.

=== Villa ===
One of the original buildings on site, the Villa (or gardener's cottage) was built of ashlar, sometime prior to 1856 in mid-19th century "bracketed" style. From 1887 to 1911 the "Stone Cottage" (originally called "Lourdes Villa") housed the St. Aloysius Academy for Boys. Many of the boys attending had sisters who were students at Mt. St. Vincent Academy. The Villa is the home of several members of Sisters of Charity of New York.

=== Founders Hall ===
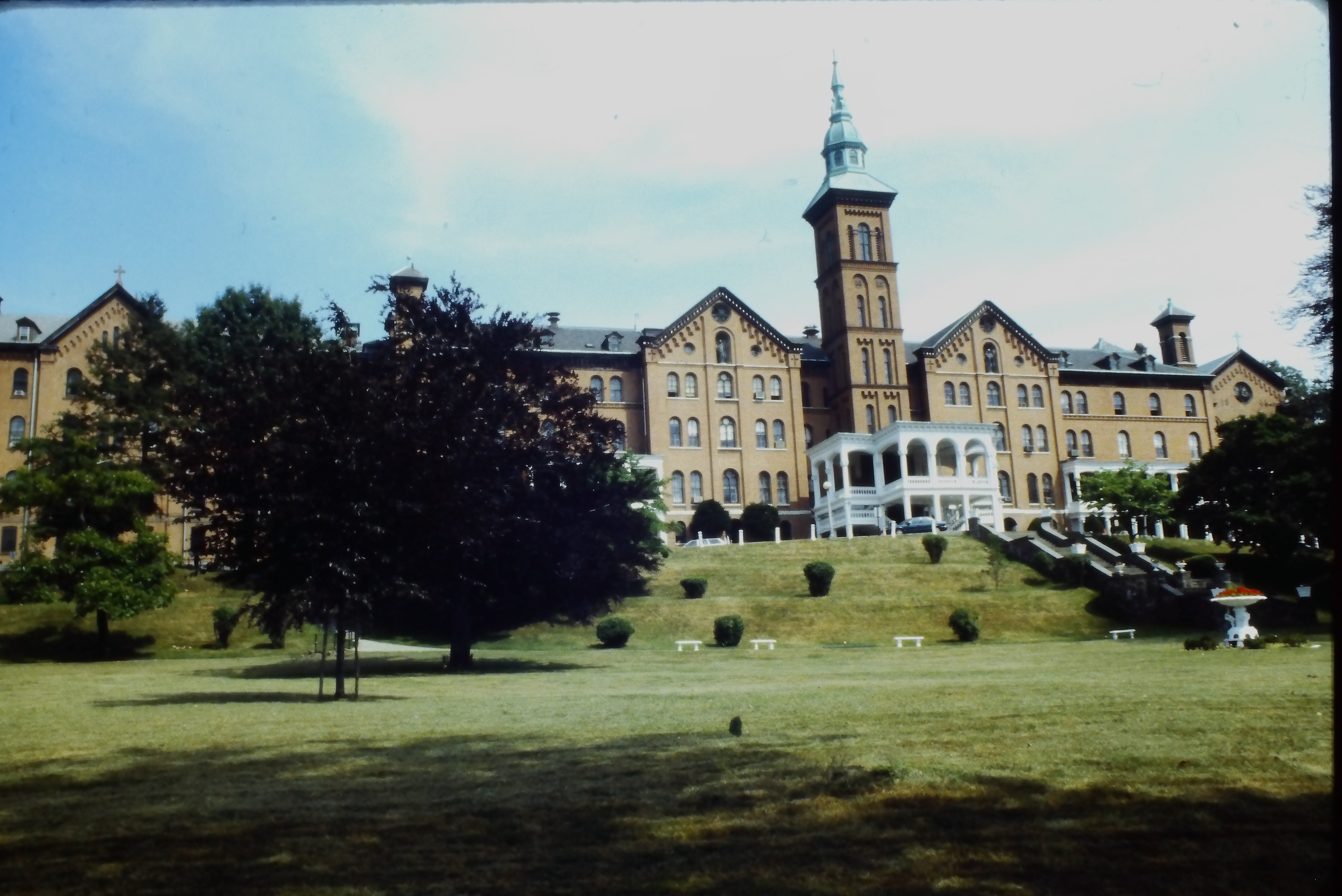
Administration Building, pictured in 1993

Founders Hall (formerly the administration building) was built between 1857 and 1859 and subsequently expanded in 1865, 1883, 1906–1908, and in 1951. The original building is a five-story red brick building on a fieldstone base. It features a six-story square tower topped by a copper lantern and spire. The tower is flanked by five story gabled sections.

The Administration Building was listed on National Registrar of Historic Places in 1980.

A fire started in half of Founders Hall in the summer of 2014 and the damage was restored later during the school year.

=== Maryvale ===
Maryvale was constructed in 1859; it originally served as a laundry. In 1906 the laundry moved to the newly constructed Rosary Hall and Maryvale housed science classes. In 1954, Science classes moved to the new science building and Maryvale became the Library Annex and Studio Annex. It later housed the communications and fine arts departments. Maryvale features a radio studio and a TV studio. The radio shows streams live on livestream. The TV studio is where students film the school's news program, Mount Saint Vincent News.

=== Lourdes Grotto ===
In 1873 the Lourdes Grotto was built and is considered one of the oldest outdoor grottos in the United States. The grotto is situated on a little island in a small lake in an area at one time known as Lourdes Park.

=== Le Gras Hall ===
In 1911, with the opening of a parochial school in Riverdale (St. Margaret of Cortona School), Le Gras was remodeled to house the university gymnasium with an auditorium on the second floor. It also housed the commuter students' cafeteria. Le Gras Hall is the headquarters for the Sisters of Charity of New York.

=== Rosary Hall ===
Several sisters from the Sisters of Charity of New York reside in Rosary Hall.

=== Peter Jay Sharp Athletic and Recreation Center ===
Opened in 2009, the Sharp Center offers 50,000 square feet of recreational space and houses the university's basketball courts, fitness center, and athletic offices. In 2016, the university placed solar panels on top of the roof of the Sharp Center.

=== Science Hall ===
In 2013, the university renovated the building.

=== Elizabeth Seton Library ===
In 1968, the new Elizabeth Seton Library was opened. The library is named after Saint Elizabeth Seton, the first native-born American to be canonized.

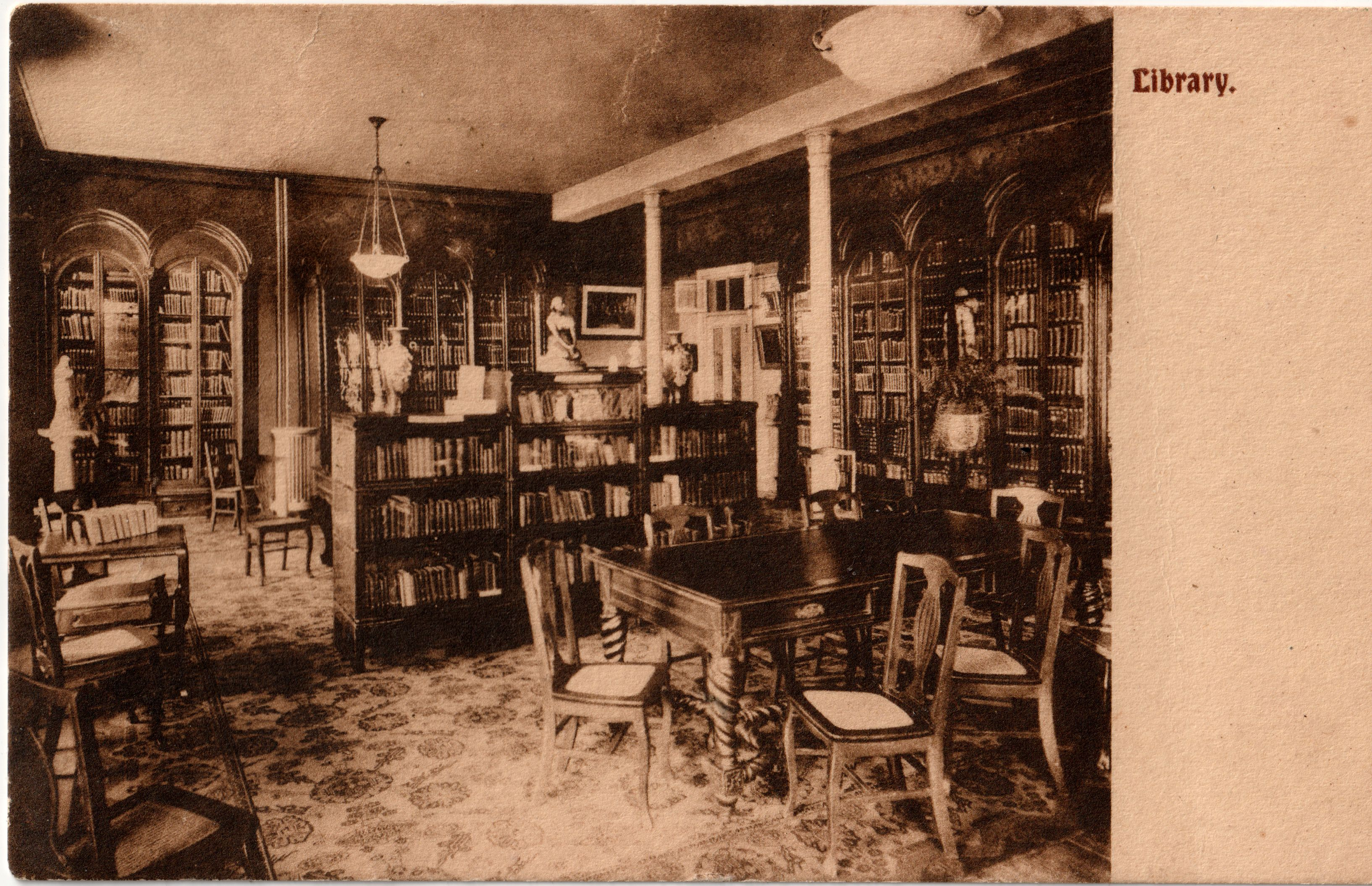
Library in the earlier part of the 20th century

=== Corazon C. Aquino Hall ===
Opened in 2021, Aquino Hall serves as a residence hall and houses the Mount's Nursing Program and Physician Assistant Program.

=== Residence halls ===
- The corner stone of the Italian Renaissance-style Seton Hall was set by John Cardinal Farley in November 1911.
- In 1962, the cornerstone was laid for Spellman Hall.
- The cornerstone was laid for the Alumnae Hall in 1965.
- Mastronardi Hall was built in 2007 and houses over 190 students.

== Presidents ==
- Charles L. Flynn, Jr. (2000–2021)
- Susan R. Burns (2021–)

== Academics ==
UMSV is registered by the New York State Education Department, Office of Higher Education, in Albany, New York, and is independently chartered to grant degrees by the Regents of the State of New York.

The student-faculty ratio at UMSV is 13:1.

== Athletics ==
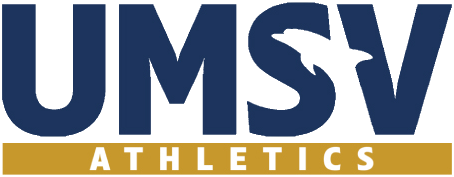
Mount St Vincent athletics logo

Mount Saint Vincent teams participate as a member of the National Collegiate Athletic Association's Division III. The Dolphins are a member of the Skyline Conference.

Men's sports include baseball, basketball, cross country, lacrosse, soccer, volleyball, tennis and wrestling, while women's sports include basketball, cross country, lacrosse, soccer, softball, and volleyball.

== Awards ==
The Elizabeth Seton Medal, the university’s highest honor, is named after the native New Yorker, Saint, and founder of the Sisters of Charity. It is awarded in recognition of outstanding achievements, generosity of spirit, and extraordinary self-sacrifice. Recipients include:

- Bruce Ritter (1978), Catholic priest and one-time Franciscan friar, founded the charity Covenant House in 1972 for homeless teenagers
- Benigno Aquino III (2010), 15th president of the Philippines 2010–2016
- Maria Angelita Ressa (2020), Filipino-American journalist and author, co-founder and CEO of Rappler, and lead investigative reporter in Southeast Asia for CNN

== Notable alumni ==
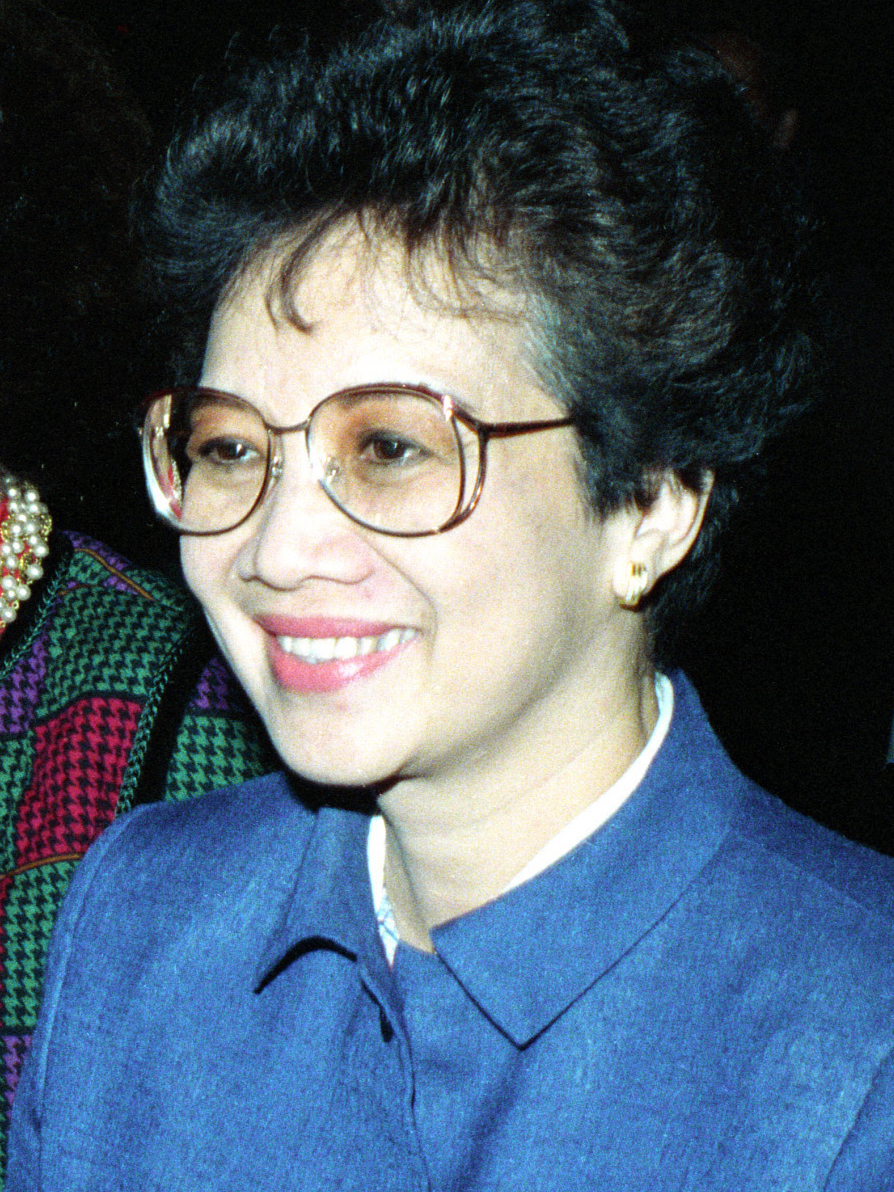
11th President of the Philippines Corazon Cojuangco-Aquino

- Corazon Cojuangco-Aquino (1953), 11th president of the Philippines
- Wendy Craigg, governor of the Central Bank of the Bahamas
- Noreen Culhane (1972), former executive vice president, New York Stock Exchange Euronext, Inc.
- Gail Dinter-Gottlieb (1965), former president of Acadia University in Wolfville, Nova Scotia
- Aline Griffith (1941), aristocrat, socialite and alleged spy
- Bernard McGuirk (1984), former executive producer of Imus in the Morning
- Miriam Naveira, chief justice of the Supreme Court of Puerto Rico
- Desus Nice, co-host of Showtime's Desus & Mero
- Eugene O'Neill (1895–1900) playwright, attended St Aloysius Academy for Boys
- Ethelinda V. Soliven, journalist

== Notable faculty and staff ==
- Ron Scapp, educator and author
- Joseph Skelly, author and veteran
- Roberto Villanueva, dancer
