= Zwaagdijk-Oost =

- Village
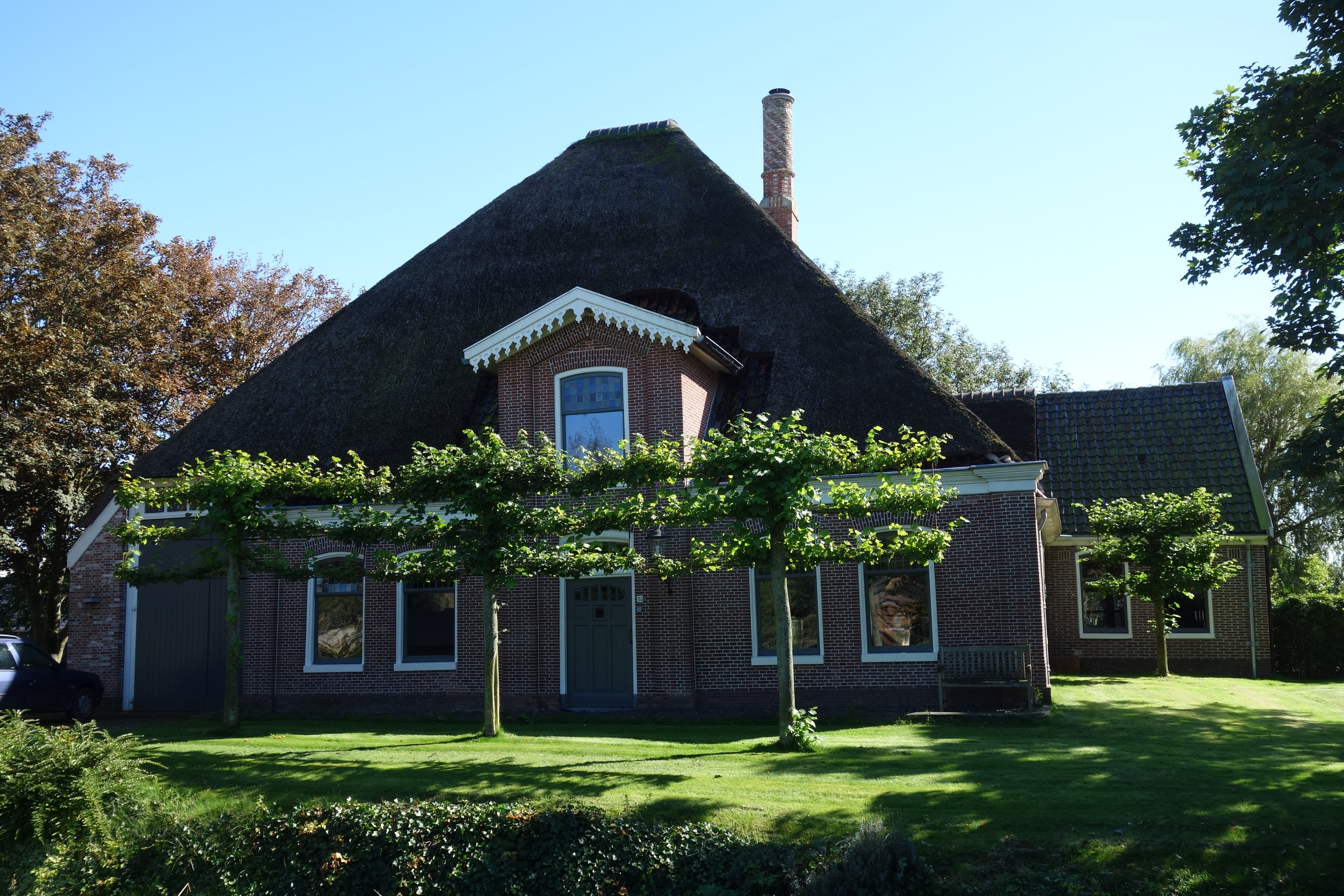
- Farm in Zwaagdijk-Oost

- Location in the Netherlands Location in the province of North Holland in the Netherlands
- Coordinates: 52°42′17″N 5°7′57″E
- Country: Netherlands
- Province: North Holland
- Municipality: Medemblik

Area
  - Village: 8.93 km^{2} (3.45 sq mi)
- Elevation: −1.3 m (−4.3 ft)

Population (2025)
  - Village: 1,335
  - Density: 149/km^{2} (387/sq mi)
  - Urban: 895
  - Rural: 440
- Time zone: UTC+1 (CET)
  - Summer (DST): UTC+2 (CEST)
- Postal code: 1681, 1682 & 1684
- Dialing code: 0228

Zwaagdijk-Oost (Dutch pronunciation: [ˈzʋaːɣdɛik ˈoːst]) is a linear settlement in the Dutch province of North Holland. It is part of the municipality of Medemblik.

The village was first mentioned in 1319 as buten den Zuoechdyc, and means "the dike belonging to Zwaag. Zwaagdijk-Oost is the settlement on the eastern side of the dike, Zwaagdijk-West is on the western side. In 1954, the Catholic St Jozef church was built in Zwaagdijk-Oost.
