= Greenhill & Co. =

American investment bank

Greenhill & Co., Inc.

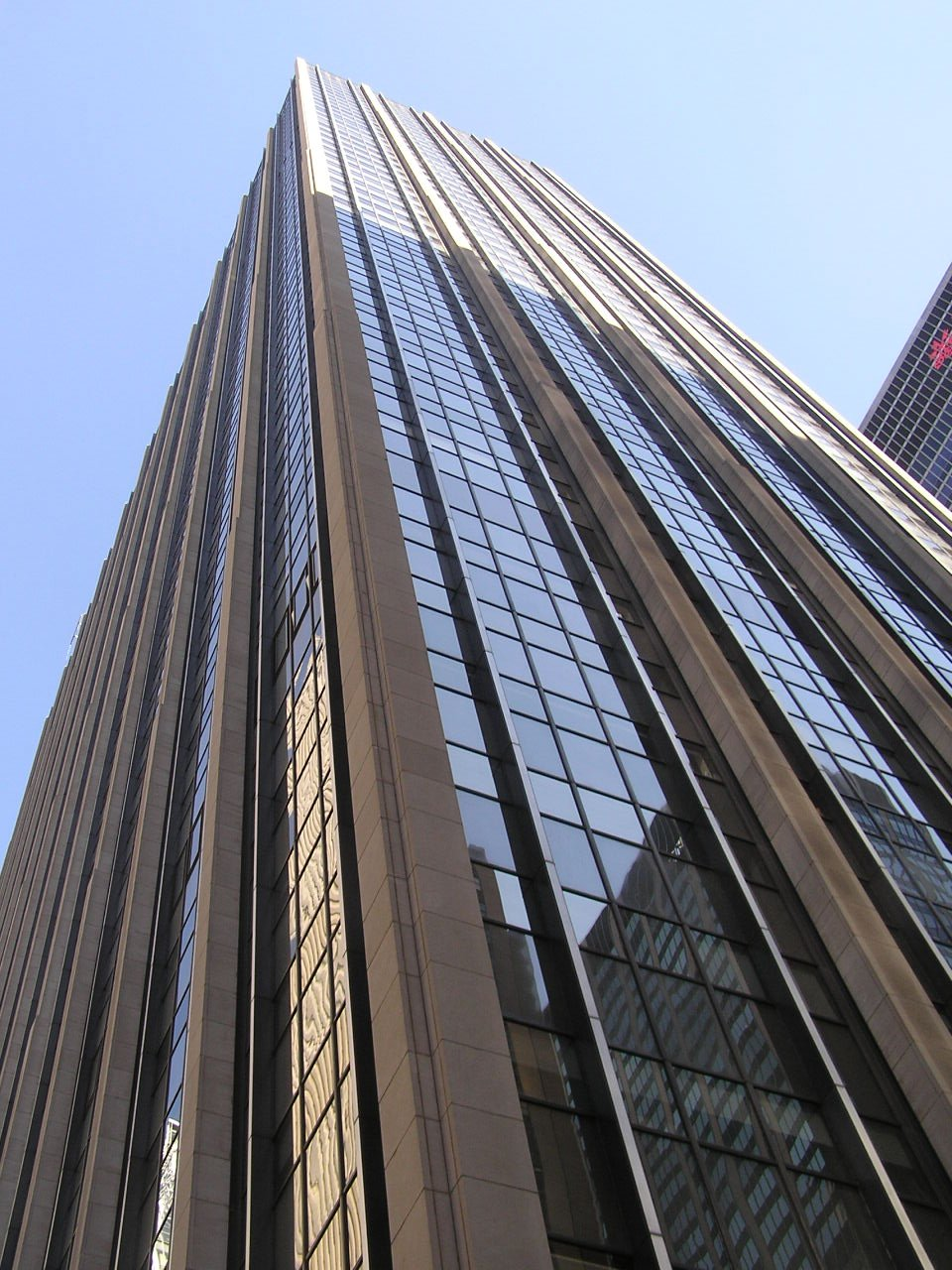
- Headquarters at 1271 Avenue of the Americas
- Industry: Investment Banking
- Founded: 1996; 30 years ago
- Founder: Robert F. Greenhill
- Headquarters: 1271 Avenue of the Americas, New York City
- Key people: Robert F. Greenhill (chairman emeritus); Scott L. Bok (chairman); Kevin Costantino (Co-Head - Greenhill New York); David A. Wyles (Co-Head Greenhill London)
- Products: Investment Banking
- Revenue: ▲US$336 million (2016)
- Net income: ▲US$61 million (2016)
- Owner: Mizuho (2023–present)
- Number of employees: 364 (December 31, 2021)
- Website: greenhill.com

Greenhill & Co., Inc. is an American investment banking advisory firm founded in 1996 in New York by Robert F. Greenhill. The firm provides advice on significant mergers, acquisitions, restructurings, financings, and capital raisings to leading corporations, partnerships, institutions and governments across a number of industries. Since its inception, Greenhill has advised on transactions valued at close to $3 trillion.

Recent clients include Actavis, Alcoa, Brookfield Corporation, Cigna, International Flavors & Fragrances, Fluor Corporation, Gannett, GlaxoSmithKline, London Stock Exchange Group, Safeway, Tegna Inc., Tesco, Teva, US Department of Treasury, and Whirlpool Corporation. Located in New York, it remains an advisory firm entirely focused on complex financial transactions across the globe.

In May 2023, Japanese conglomerate Mizuho acquired Greenhill for $550 million in an all cash transaction. On December 1, 2023 it was announced that the purchase had been completed, pursuant to which Greenhill will operate as an independent M&A and restructuring advisory arm.

== History ==
Greenhill & Co. was established in New York City in 1996 by Robert F. Greenhill, the former president of Morgan Stanley and former chairman and chief executive officer of Smith Barney. He founded the first M&A group on Wall Street while at Morgan Stanley and became an early pioneer of the industry.

Greenhill & Co. has been featured in many prominent assignments since its founding including the $100 billion acquisition of ABN AMRO in 2007, the United States Department of Treasury's divestiture of its $51 billion stake in AIG in 2012, Roche on the $46.9 billion acquisition of the outstanding publicly held interest in Genentech in 2009, and the $17 billion merger between Northwest Airlines and Delta Air Lines in 2008. The firm was also involved as an adviser to a highly influential group of former Morgan Stanley partners in their successful and controversial bid to have former Morgan Stanley CEO Philip J. Purcell step down in 2005.

Like a number of other independent investment banks, Greenhill has grown by recruiting a significant number of managing directors from major investment banks (as well as senior professionals from other institutions). The firm has also expanded globally, opening further offices and operations in North America, Europe, Australasia, Asia, South America and the Middle East, most recently in Singapore.

In May 2004, the firm completed an initial public offering of common stock onto the New York Stock Exchange.

In October 2013, the firm announced that it had opened an office in São Paulo in conjunction with hiring Daniel Wainstein, the former head of Goldman Sachs' Brazilian investment banking business.

In 2014, Greenhill advised on the $25 billion acquisition of Forest Laboratories by Actavis and the $10 billion merger between Safeway and Albertsons. Both transactions were among the ten largest of the year globally.

In January 2015, Greenhill agreed to purchase Cogent Partners, a leading investment bank focused on secondary market advisory for private equity investments.

In July 2015, Greenhill advised Teva Pharmaceuticals on the $40.5 billion acquisition of Allergan plc’s Generics business in one of the largest transactions globally in 2015.

In 2017, Greenhill advised Tesco on the £3.7 billion acquisition of Booker, the UK's largest food wholesale operator, and advised Ladbrokes Coral for a £4 billion takeover approach by GVC.

In 2019, Greenhill advised International Flavors & Fragrances on its merger with DuPont’s Nutrition & Biosciences (N&B) business in a Reverse Morris Trust transaction. The deal valued the combined company at $45.4 billion on an enterprise value basis, reflecting a value of $26.2 billion for the N&B business based on IFF’s share price as of December 13, 2019.

In 2019, the firm advised Total System Services, Inc., a provider of payment processing, merchant services and payment services, on its $21.5 billion merger with Global Payments Inc., a payment technology company focused on merchant acquiring and software solutions.

In 2022, the firm advised Brookfield Corporation on its acquisition of control of Westinghouse Electric Company, one of the world’s largest nuclear services businesses, for an enterprise value of $7.9 billion. Following the completion of the transaction, Brookfield holds a 51% stake in Westinghouse, with the remaining stake held by Cameco Corporation.

In May 2023, Japanese group Mizuho agreed to acquire Greenhill for $550 million.

== Global presence ==
Greenhill operates from 17 offices globally across North and South America, Europe and the Middle East, and Asia and Australia:

- Toronto
- Chicago
- Dallas
- Houston
- New York City
- San Francisco
- Paris
- Frankfurt
- Madrid
- Stockholm
- London
- Melbourne
- Sydney
- Hong Kong
- Tokyo
- Singapore

== Notable current and former employees ==
- Robert F. Greenhill – founder and chairman of Greenhill & Co
- Scott Bok – CEO of Greenhill & Co & former University of Pennsylvania board chair
- David Wyles – president of Greenhill & Co
- Lord Lupton – former chairman of Greenhill Europe, life peer
- William Perez – former CEO of Wm. Wrigley Jr. Company and Nike, Inc.
- Simon Borrows – CEO of 3i
- Brian Cassin – CEO of Experian
- James Stewart – former CEO of MGM Growth Properties
- Sir Simon Mayall – former British lieutenant general
- Ben Loomes – co-head, 3i Infrastructure
- Andrew Woeber – former Morgan Stanley managing director, Cravath lawyer and Stanford board member

== See also ==
- List of investment banks
- Boutique investment bank
