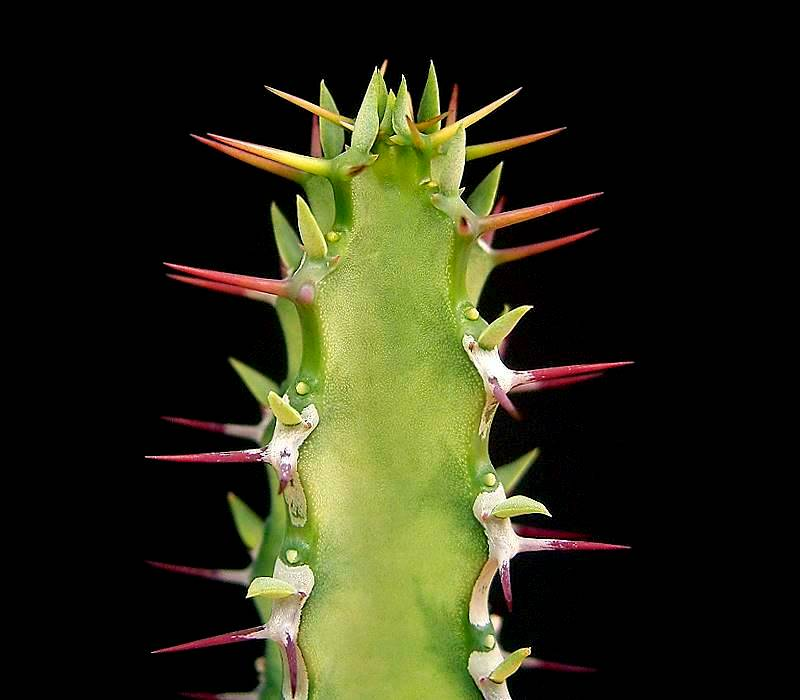
- Euphorbia heterochroma ssp. tsavoensis

Scientific classification
- Kingdom: Plantae
- Clade: Embryophytes
- Clade: Tracheophytes
- Clade: Spermatophytes
- Clade: Angiosperms
- Clade: Eudicots
- Clade: Rosids
- Order: Malpighiales
- Family: Euphorbiaceae
- Genus: Euphorbia
- Species: E. heterochroma

Binomial name
- Euphorbia heterochroma Pax

Subspecies
- Euphorbia heterochroma subsp. heterochroma; Euphorbia heterochroma subsp. tsavoensis S.Carter

= Euphorbia heterochroma =

Species of flowering plant

Euphorbia heterochroma, sometimes known as the African cathedral plant, is a species of flowering plant in the family Euphorbiaceae native to eastern Africa.

== Taxonomy ==
The species was first described by the German botanist Ferdinand Albin Pax in 1895, based on specimens collected in Tanzania. The specific epithet heterochroma is derived from the Greek words heteros (different) and chroma (color), referring to the variable coloration of the plant’s stems and floral parts.

=== Subspecies ===
Two subspecies are recognized:

Euphorbia heterochroma subsp. heterochroma – the autonym subspecies.

Euphorbia heterochroma subsp. tsavoensis S.Carter – described by Susan Carter in 1987; distinguished by its smaller stature and more compact growth form, endemic to the Tsavo region of Kenya.

=== Synonyms ===
Heterotypic synonyms include:

Euphorbia heterochroma var. mitis (Pax) N.E.Br.

Euphorbia impervia A.Berger

Euphorbia mitis Pax

Euphorbia stuhlmannii Schweinf. ex Volkens (nom. illeg.)

Some specimens previously identified as E. heterochroma in southern Africa have since been reclassified as Euphorbia griseola subsp. griseola.

== Description ==
Euphorbia heterochroma is a straggly, succulent shrub with erect or decumbent branches that root where they touch the ground. It typically reaches up to 2 m (6.6 ft) in height, with moderate branching above.

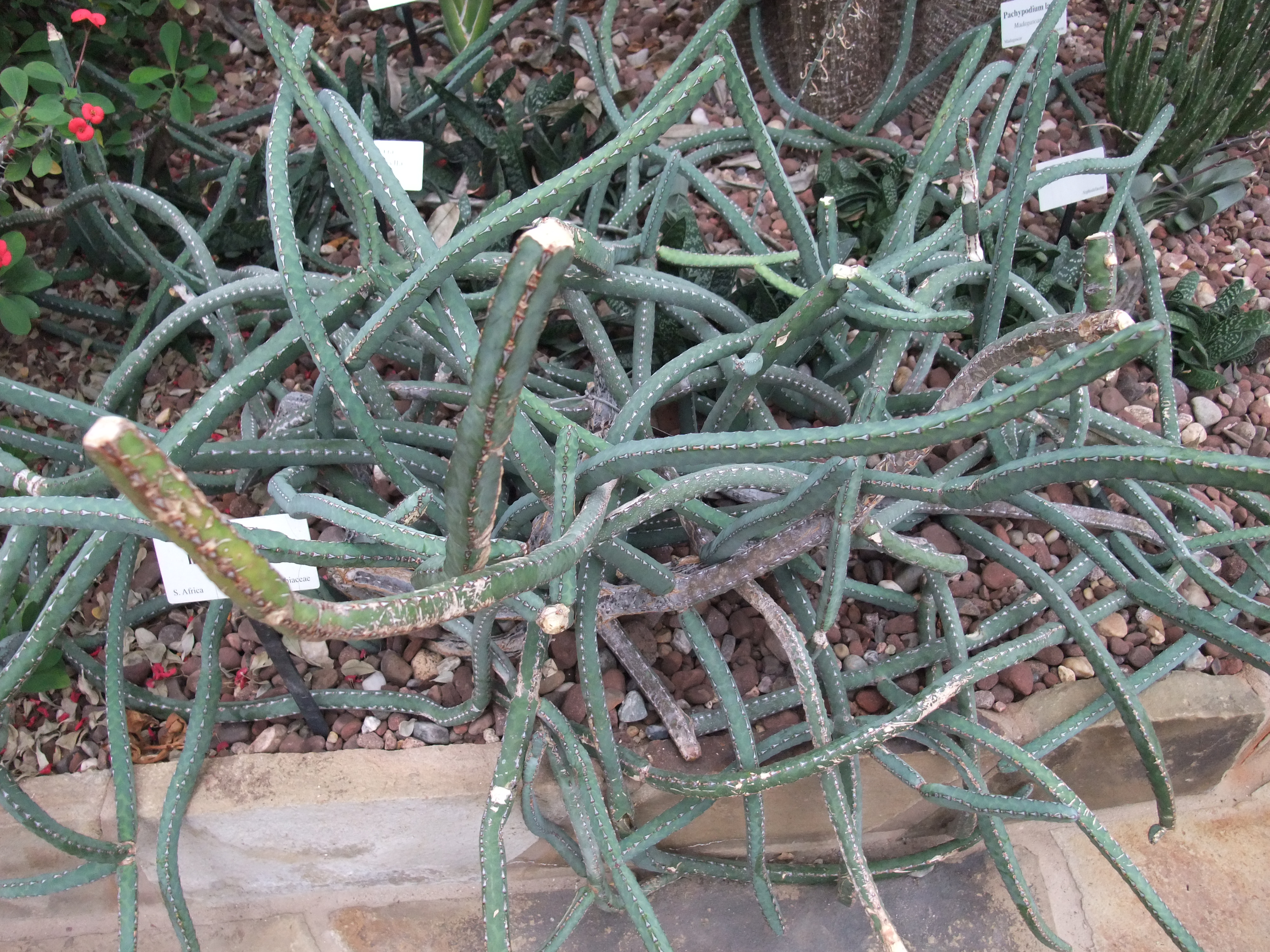

The branches are 4-angled, occasionally 5-angled, measuring approximately 2 cm (0.79 in) in thickness. The angles are straight to shallowly undulate, with a green coloration that typically displays regular darker patches along the angles. The spine‑shields are elongated, reaching up to 5 mm × 2 mm (0.197 in × 0.079 in) above the spines, and may form a continuous horny margin along the angles. The spines are 1–6 mm long, occasionally absent, with vestigial prickles.

The leaves are small and deltoid, approximately 1.5 mm × 1.5 mm (0.059 in × 0.059 in), with very obscurely toothed margins. The inflorescence consists of solitary, 1-forked cymes with stout peduncles and cyme‑branches 2–3 mm long, appearing yellow or red. The cyathia (cup‑like structures containing the flowers) are approximately 3 mm × 6 mm (0.12 in × 0.24 in) with cup‑shaped involucres. The glands are transversely oblong, about 1.4 mm × 3 mm (0.055 in × 0.118 in), and contiguous. The male flowers feature fan‑shaped, deeply laciniate bracteoles and stamens 3.8 mm long, while the female flower has styles 1.8 mm long joined at the base with rugose apices.

The fruit is a sharply 3‑lobed capsule, approximately 3 mm × 5.5 mm (0.12 in × 0.22 in), exserted on a reflexed pedicel about 5 mm long. The seeds are ovoid, approximately 2.2 mm × 2 mm (0.087 in × 0.079 in), grey, and shallowly tuberculate.

== Distribution and habitat ==
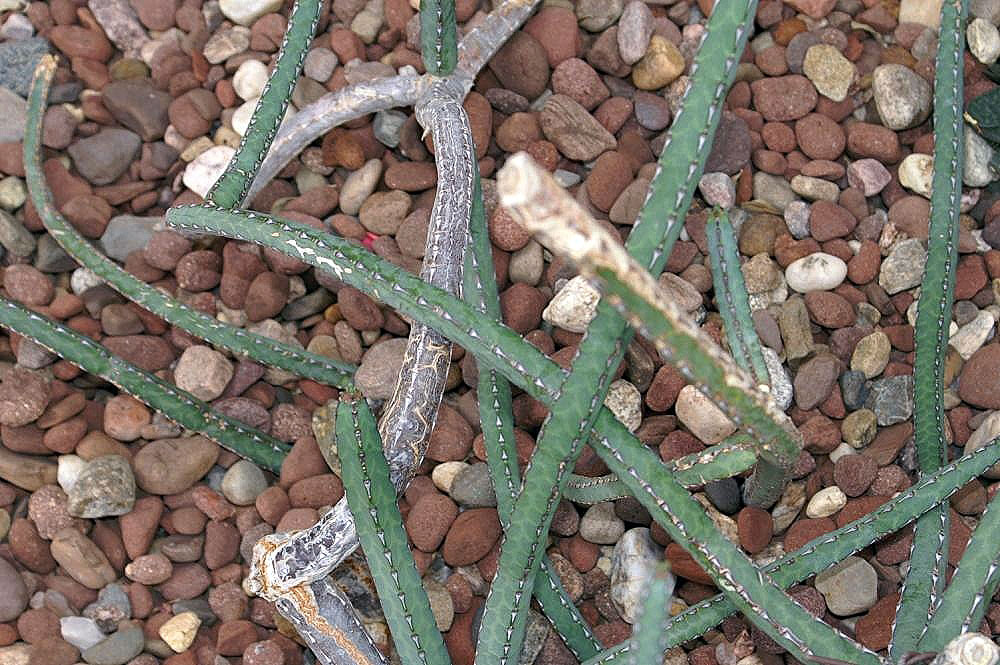

Euphorbia heterochroma is native to Kenya and northeastern Tanzania. It grows in stony, sandy soils within Acacia and Commiphora thickets, as well as on rocky outcrops with deciduous thickets. In its native range it occurs at elevations between 450 and 1,300 m (1,480 and 4,270 ft) above sea level.
