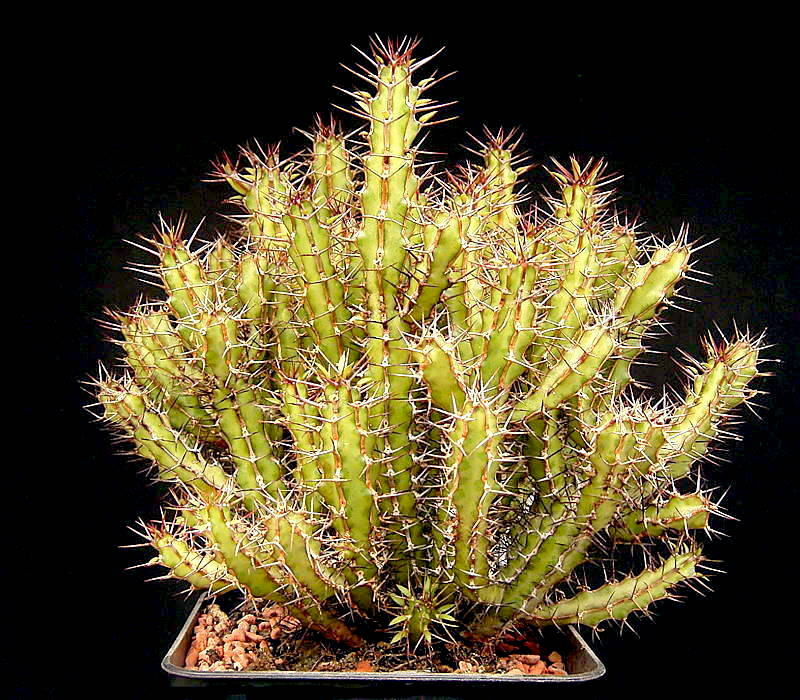

Scientific classification
- Kingdom: Plantae
- Clade: Tracheophytes
- Clade: Angiosperms
- Clade: Eudicots
- Clade: Rosids
- Order: Malpighiales
- Family: Euphorbiaceae
- Genus: Euphorbia
- Species: E. griseola

Binomial name
- Euphorbia griseola Pax

= Euphorbia griseola =

Species of flowering plant

Euphorbia griseola is a species of plant in the family Euphorbiaceae.
