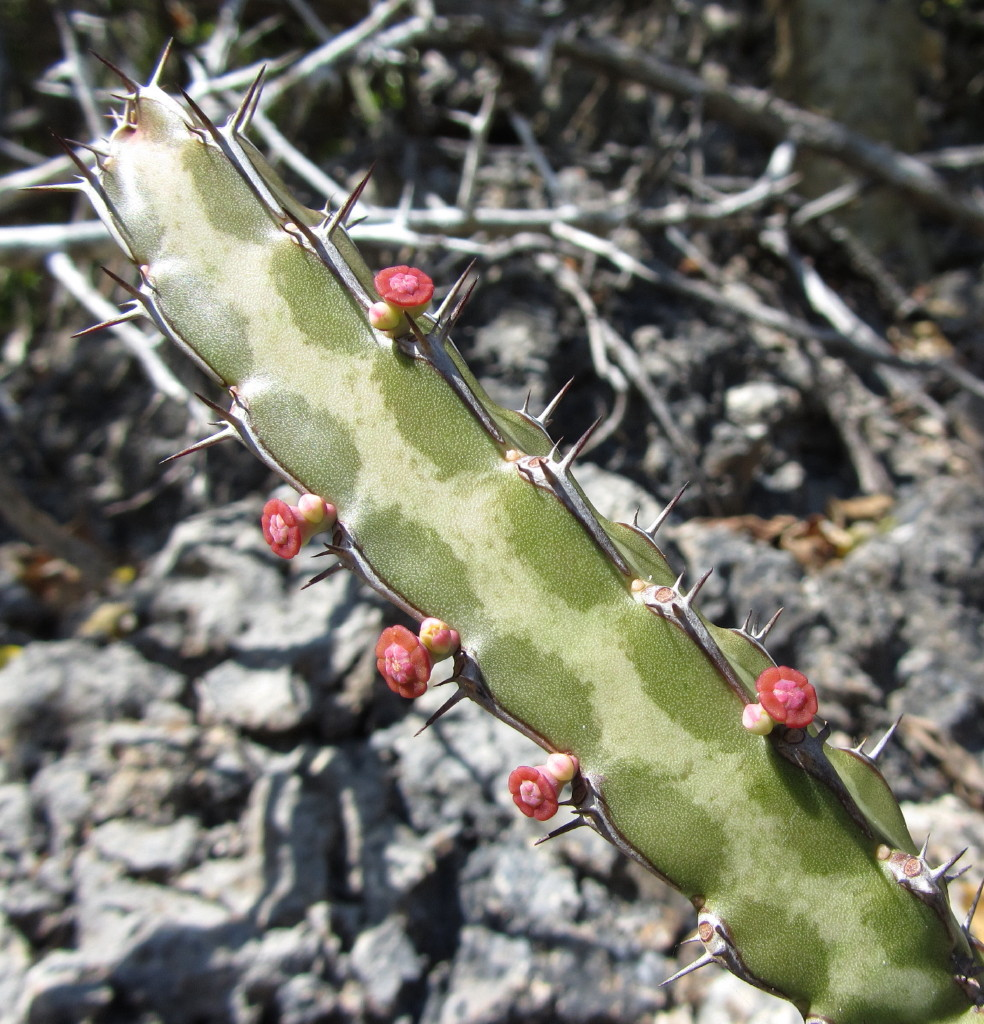

Conservation status
- Least Concern (IUCN 3.1)

Scientific classification
- Kingdom: Plantae
- Clade: Tracheophytes
- Clade: Angiosperms
- Clade: Eudicots
- Clade: Rosids
- Order: Malpighiales
- Family: Euphorbiaceae
- Genus: Euphorbia
- Species: E. lividiflora

Binomial name
- Euphorbia lividiflora L.C.Leach

= Euphorbia lividiflora =

Species of flowering plant

Euphorbia lividiflora is a species of plant in the family Euphorbiaceae. It is found in Malawi, Mozambique, Tanzania, and Zimbabwe. It is threatened by habitat loss.
