= Pimelodendron amboinicum =

Scientific classification
- Kingdom: Plantae
- Clade: Embryophytes
- Clade: Tracheophytes
- Clade: Spermatophytes
- Clade: Angiosperms
- Clade: Eudicots
- Clade: Rosids
- Order: Malpighiales
- Family: Euphorbiaceae
- Genus: Pimelodendron
- Species: P. amboinicum

Binomial name
- Pimelodendron amboinicum Hassk. (1855)

Synonyms
- Carumbium amboinicum (Hassk.) Miq. (1859); Daphniphyllum conglutinosum Hemsl. (1895); Pimelodendron naumannianum Pax & K.Hoffm. (1924); Pimelodendron papuanum Warb. (1893)

Species of tree in the Euphorbiaceae family from New Guinea and Maluku

Pimelodendron amboinicum is a tree species in the Euphorbiaceae family. It is found from the Solomon Islands in the southwest Pacific Ocean, west to Sulawesi in Indonesia. The timber is used locally, though larger-scale illegal logging is apparent.

== Description ==
The species grows as a tree some 10–35 m tall, with a diameter at breast height of 7–70 cm and with its bole (bare trunk) 5–20 m high. The smooth bark is blackish brown to red brown. The tree has a wide canopy. The trunk and twigs of the species when cut quickly exude a milky sap which on exposure turns cream/yellowish. When the bark is peeled from the stem the underlying layer (subrhytidome) is dark red. The simple leaves are crowded towards the end of the twigs, about 6-16 × 4–6 cm in size, with two glands (flat or slightly raised) near the base on the lower side, on either side of the midrib near the margin. There are small and inconspicuous stipules. Flowers are some 2 to 3mm in diameter, female flower features are not complete, the stigma is sessile. In the male flowers, the perianth is more or less two-lobed, about 10-13 stamens and pistillode is absent. The fruits are pyriform/ellipsoid, some 25 x 15mm in size, with depressed globose (or nearly kidney-shaped) seeds some 12-15 x 10mm in size. They are half enclosed in an aril or cupule which is multilobulate. They occur axillary, singly or in bunches, in February in Cape York Peninsula, but all year round in the rest of its range. The skin/testa is finely radiate-striolate. Wood density is some 0.534 g/cm^{3}.

Distinguishing anatomy of this species include the following traits: pyriform fruit; no remnants of stigma present; single globose seeds per fruit. lobes of the stigma are pulvinate (swollen at either end), flat; 3 rows of stamens.

The wood anatomy of this species has an unusual and reliably diagnostic character: the presence of latex tubes in the rays.

== Distribution ==
The tree is found in the Solomons, southwest Pacific, New Guinea, Australia and in Indonesia as far west as Sulawesi. Countries and regions where the species grows are: Solomon Islands; Papua Niugini (Bougainville, Bismarck Archipelago, mainland); Australia (Cape York Peninsula, near Lockerbie and Iron Range); Indonesia (West Papua, Maluku, Nusa Tenggara, Sulawesi); Timor.

== Habitat, ecology ==
The tree is found in both primary and secondary forest (particularly mixed dipterocarp), in rain forest, in pockets within coastal savanna, in swamp forest and on the edges of rivers. It grows on sandy clay, volcanic and limestone soils, from sea level to 1000 m elevation. It is recorded growing in primary lower montane rainforest between 1500 and 1800 m at the Hindenburg Wall in Papua New Guinea.

Along with Pometia pinnata and Pterocarpus indica, this species is one of the most abundant plants in the lowland rainforest near Baitabag, Ohu and Mis villages, Madang Province, PNG. In the primary and old secondary forest of the area, the most frequent trees were Macaranga novoguineensis, Pimelodendron amboinicum, Ficus bernaysii, Ficus phaeosyce and Ficus wassa. The leaf-eating invertebrate community of this tree in the area is unusually dominated (57%) by a single Oenospila species of moth (Lepidoptera: Geometridae)

In the Arui watershed of Manokwari Regency, West Papua, the species is one of the most dominant species. The population shows effects of illegal logging.

At the relatively high-elevation Hindenburg Wall forest, the species grows in a community characterised by Syzygium species, Buchanania macrocarpa, Campnosperma brevipetiolatum, Caldcluvia nymannii, and Planchonella, Calophyllum and Pandanus arborescent species. The understorey is dominated by Cyathea, Cyrtandra, Garcinia and Medinilla species, with scattered Psychotria and Myrsine individuals. Medinilla, Freycinetia, various orchids and Paphia species are the most frequent epiphytes.

In Cape York Peninsula the plant grows in gallery forest and dry seasonal rainforest, from near sea level to 100m elevation.

The tallest, most impressive forests on Waigeo of the Raja Ampat Islands, West Papua, contain the species as a co-dominant, along with Hopea novoguineensis, Homalium foetidum, Mallotus floribundus, Spathiostemon javensis, and Vatica rassak, with Elatostema and Piper quite common in the understorey. This forest grows on alluvial and residual sandstone and volcanic soils.

This tree is the most dominant of trees on Salibabu of the Talaud Islands, it is also important on the other islands. The presence of the tree is an indicator of the presence of the Talaud bear cuscus (Ailurops melanotis). The large tree with wide-spreading branches is favourable to the cuscus's ability to move. The young leaves of the plant are eaten by the cuscus, however they are low-ranked in its preferences.

Tephritid fruit flies of the Bulladcus subgenus, Bactrocera genus use the species as a host.

== Vernacular names ==
The home of this species is a linguistically diverse area, some of the common names for the plant include:

- Solomon Islands: aisubu (Kwara'ae
- New Guinea: dee, ereroe, koro (Ambai/Randawaya); marendom (Biak); kimoko, mimika (Engan languages/Tarie); bepie (Atam); diro (Meyah/Sidei); joem (Moi/Mooi); pekre (Mpur/Kebar); komkwa, sowgwa (Sougb/Manikiong); koromi (Wandamen)
- Maluku: ai mulute, mamina (Ambonese Malay); angalkenga, asare (Otimmer); espahat, sepahat (Buru); goro koeratji (Bacan); ngalim, o tigo-tigono, pake (Galela); pokopokor (Malay, Tobelo); roebi tima (Mangole); kaporaja (Ternate); gawi lalagoe, lemtja, mamare, moi, moreala (Tobelo); posidi (Waoili)
- Sulawesi: tambodja (Baree); sinto (Muna); amead’a (Tabaur); gito (Tadjiosch); malala’a (Talaud, Salib)

In Australia the plant is commonly called pimelodendron.

== Uses ==
Timber from the tree is used locally for building purposes, including for roofs, roof-trusses, posts, and pillars. It is not considered as a commercial timber species, though it seems to be targeted for illegal logging. The tree produces latex, which is used for gluing wood. Species in the genus Pimelodendron have a role in land rehabilitation and reforestation, they are also seen as ornamental plants. The species may have medicinal properties.

== History ==
Justus Carl Hasskarl (1811–94), a German-Dutch botanist described the species in 1855 in his paper, Brief van der Heer Hasskarl aan den secretaris der Natuurkundige Afdeeling van de Koninklijke Akademie van Wetenschappen te Amsterdam, in the periodical Verslagen en Mededeelingen van de Afdeeling Natuurkunde; Koninklijke Akademie van Wetenschappen (Volume 4(1):140).
