= Hopea novoguineensis =

Conservation status
- Least Concern (IUCN 3.1)

Scientific classification
- Kingdom: Plantae
- Clade: Embryophytes
- Clade: Tracheophytes
- Clade: Angiosperms
- Clade: Eudicots
- Clade: Rosids
- Order: Malvales
- Family: Dipterocarpaceae
- Genus: Hopea
- Species: H. novoguineensis

Binomial name
- Hopea novoguineensis Slooten

Species of tree from New Guinea and Halmahera

Hopea novoguineensis is a rainforest tree species in the Dipterocarpaceae family. It is found in New Guinea and on Halmahera, Maluku Province, Indonesia. The tree produces good timber.

== Description ==
The species is a medium-sized tree with tall buttresses. Leaves are variable in shape (particularly in cordate base), papery with a pale and dull undersurface, laminar service highly variable in lustrousness, the margin may be revolute (rolled towards lower surface), variable size, some 10-28 x 3.5-10 cm. Panicles (the branched inflorescence), bracts (specialised leaves), stipules and parts of the petals that are exposed in the buds, are all covered in dense persistent buff-coloured hairs (Trichomes). There are 15 stamens in three subequal verticils (whorls), they are shorter than the style. The panicle is up to 9 cm long, can be arranged 3-axillary or be terminal, one branch. The ovary is small and tapers to a distinct subcylindrical stylopodium, equally long, and short style.

It is distinguished from other Malesian Hopea species by the following traits: evenly pubescent (hairy) young parts; lower part of the leaf is smooth (glabrous) and when dry is dull greyish.

== Distribution ==
The tree grows on the island of New Guinea and in the Indonesian province of Maluku. It has been observed in the Western Province (Papua New Guinea), Sorong Regency and southern parts of West Papua (Indonesian New Guinea), and on Halmahera in North Maluku Province.

== Habitat, ecology ==
Surrounding the village of Kwerba, in the Foja Mountains, West Papua, is a species-rich rainforest. The forest is not tall, even emergents are only some 25 m (82 ft) tall, this in line with many forests of New Guinea, but is unusual for rainforests elsewhere in the world. Hopea novoguineensis is one of the most abundant trees, usually in the second-highest stratum of the canopy, but occasionally an emergent.

On the island of Salawati of the Raja Ampat Islands, West Papua, the lowland forest canopy is dominated by Intsia bijuga, I. palembanica, Artocarpus altilis, Pometia pinnata, Vatica rassak, Koordersiodendron pinnatum, Celtis philippensis, Semecarpus sp., and Hopea novoguineensis.

The tallest, most impressive forests on Waigeo of the Raja Ampat Islands, eastern Indonesia, contain the species as a co-dominant, along with Spathiostemon javensis, Homalium foetidum, Mallotus floribundus, Pimelodendron amboinicum, and Vatica rassak, with Elatostema and Piper quite common in the understorey. This forest grows on alluvial and residual sandstone and volcanic soils.

Galls with wiry appendages have been observed on the leaves of this species, associated with Coccoid scale insects.

In the Aketajawe-Lolobata National Park of Halmahera, Indonesia, the species is one of a number of large-diameter trees, vulnerable to illegal logging.

== Uses ==
The tree is a good timber species.

== History ==
The species was described by Dirk Fok van Slooten (nl) (1891-1953), a Nederlanders botanist, in 1924 in the periodical Nova Guinea; a Journal of Botany, Zoology, Anthropology, Ethnography, Geology and Palaeontology of the Papuan Region. Leiden.
