= Spathiostemon javensis =

Conservation status
- Least Concern (IUCN 3.1)

Scientific classification
- Kingdom: Plantae
- Clade: Embryophytes
- Clade: Tracheophytes
- Clade: Angiosperms
- Clade: Eudicots
- Clade: Rosids
- Order: Malpighiales
- Family: Euphorbiaceae
- Genus: Spathiostemon
- Species: S. javensis

Binomial name
- Spathiostemon javensis Blume

Synonyms
- Adelia javanica Miq.; Homonoia javensis (Blume) Müll.Arg.; Mallotus calvus Pax & K.Hoffm.; Mallotus eglandulosus Elmer; Polydragma mallotiformis Hook.f.; Spathiostemon javensis var. nimae Airy Shaw

Species of plant

Spathiostemon javensis is a plant that can grow as a shrub or a tree in the tribe Acalypheae of the family Euphorbiaceae. It is native to the region from the Bismarck Archipelago to New Guinea, Wallacea and into Southeast Asia. It is often common in the understorey of forests. The wood is used in construction.

== Description ==
The species can grow as a shrub up to a tree some 20m high, with a diameter at breast height up to 45 cm, seldom with buttresses up to a metre high and long, some 30 cm thick. The bark is smooth and fluted, peels off in scales and strips, its colour varies through white, grey, white mottled, dark red, pale brown, dark brown to black. The wood varies from soft but is usually hard, the sapwood is white to brownish, while the heartwood is brownish. The leaves are elliptic to somewhat obovate in shape, about 4.3-24 x 1.7-11 cm in size, smooth and glabrous, though perhaps some hairs on the lower side midrib. Flower colour from green, white, yellow to brown. Fruit is some 1-1.2 x 0.6-0.7 cm in size, and pink-brownish to reddish and yellow, with hairs. Flowering and fruiting occur all year round.

Spathiostemon javensis is distinguished from its only sister species (Spathiostemon moniliformis) by having: subhirsute petioles; hair tuft domatia usually on leaves; the inflorescences are subhirsute, while the staminate inflorescences are up to 7.3 cm long; there are 5 sepals of pistillate flowers; and the ovary and fruit are echinate (have spines).

== Habitat, ecology ==
The tree is often common in the understorey of primary and secondary forests in shrublands, on cliffs, river-edges and even in and alongside plantations of rubber and cocoa. It favours flat to undulating country, with ability to grow in sediments that are dry to periodically inundated. Often grows in limestone soils but also alluvial, black/brown clay, clay-loam and sand. Occurs from sea level up to 670m elevation. In the Buol Regency, central Sulawesi, the tree occurs in both undisturbed and disturbed forest. In the south of West Papua, on the border with Papua Niugini, small Spathistemon javensis trees are positively associated with Pometia pinnata, a targeted logging species. At Aipiri, Manokwari, West Papua, the tree did not grow on the coast, but dominated the forest 600m inland, along with Horsfieldia irya and Myristica fatua. At another site in Manokwari, the species was highly associated with natural Intsia bijuga stands.

The tallest, most impressive forests on Waigeo of the Raja Ampat Islands, eastern Indonesia, contain the species as a co-dominant, along with Hopea novoguineensis, Homalium foetidum, Mallotus floribundus, Pimelodendron amboinicum, and Vatica rassak, with Elatostema and Piper quite common in the understorey. This forest grows on alluvial and residual sandstone and volcanic soils.

The plants are spread by fruit-eating birds and mammals.

== Distribution ==
The tree/shrub is endemic to Malesia, and is found from the Bismarck Archipelago across to parts of Southeast Asia. Countries and regions that it is found in are: Papua New Guinea (Bismarck Archipelago, mainland); Indonesia (Maluku, Nusa Tenggara, Sulawesi, Kalimantan; Jawa, not present in Sumatera); Philippines (except Luzon); and Malaysia (Sabah where it is particularly common, Sarawak, and Perak).

== Conservation ==
As stated above the IUCN regards the conservation this taxa as of least concern. This is because there is a large population of the trees over a very wide distribution, with no obvious current or future threats.

== Vernacular names ==
The plant, with a wide and common distribution, has many names: Papua New Guinea: ali'es, baulai, kalikal, konos, kulis, o, oluai, on'as, sanam, uk, unase, yehaye (Amele); gale, galud, keka, kisos, menag, ninegsi, niniki (Biliau); asoadzim (Bogia); bisip, dzumpiam, kala, malamamoi, mempong, pasip, sarenki, singas, tumpahop, wasirip (Dumpu); bulim, dabe, gwandere, mai, orare, sariri, tukai, unai, wime (Faita); sarr (Jal); West Papua: batogara (Kemtuik/Kemtoek); pole (Sentani); megwe (Berik); darmor (Biak); samakjor (Numfor/Numfur); hoekane (Iria/Irian?); boeboekwa, kegboi, sorohok (Sougb/Manikiong); djangere (Irarutu/Iraroetoe); anan (Wain); boeboeika, menom; Halmahera: obadinga mabedeka (Tabaru/Tobaro); Philippines: oyagingon (Manobo); apanang (Waray/Waray-waray); Sabah: kubur (Bonggi/Dusun Banggi); ansalapan, mengkig, toto (Eastern Kadazan/Dusun Kinabatangan); kilas (Lun Bawang/Murud); sengulpid (Sungai/Sungei); lengkan (K.); Sarawak: bantas (Iban); Kalimantan: wajan koreng.

== Uses ==
The wood of this species is used for constructions in sea-water in Halmahera, Indonesia, and in the Philippines for general construction.

Indonesian sources describe the wood as being heavy, of strength class II (fairly strong), durability class V {high durability}, and traditionally used for house pillars and bridges.tionally used as house pillars and bridges. It was identified as having a high potential as a shade-tree in merbau (Intsia bijuga, an important global commercial timber) plantations.

== History ==
The Braunschweig born botanist Carl Ludwig Blume (1796–1862), described this species in 1826 in his publication Bijdragen tot de Flora van Nederlandsch Indie.
