= Mallotus floribundus =

Conservation status
- Least Concern (IUCN 3.1)

Scientific classification
- Kingdom: Plantae
- Clade: Tracheophytes
- Clade: Angiosperms
- Clade: Eudicots
- Clade: Rosids
- Order: Malpighiales
- Family: Euphorbiaceae
- Genus: Mallotus
- Species: M. floribundus

Binomial name
- Mallotus floribundus (Blume) Müll.Arg.

Synonyms
- Adisca floribunda Blume; Coelodiscus annamiticus (Kuntze) Gagnep.; Mallotus amentiformis Müll.Arg.; Mallotus annamiticus Kuntze; Mappa floribunda (Blume) Zoll. & Moritzi; Ricinus floribundus Reinw. ex Müll.Arg.; Rottlera floribunda (Blume) Hassk.

Species of tree

Mallotus floribundus is a tree in the family Euphorbiaceae, in the Stylanthus section, native to Southeast Asia, Wallaceae, New Guinea and the Solomon Islands.

== Description ==
The species grows a small tree, up to 18m, occasionally 25m, tall. It has a mostly straight trunk with a many branching bush crown. Its bark can occur as smooth to fissured, with lenticels. The leaves are (sometimes ovate) to broadly ovate to orbicular, with an irregular margin (sometimes slightly dentate to crenate. The staminate (male) flowers are white to yellowish, while the pistillate (female) flowers are pale green to whitish.

Features used to distinguish the species include: the shape of the leaf blade (see above), their length-width ratio (0.7-1.9), the shape of the margins, an acute to acuminate apex, and two or three conspicuously large hair tufts at the petiole insertion of the lower surface (except in the Solomon Islands and East Papua New Guinea), domatia (rarely hairy) are present higher along the midrib, leaves are often glaucouse, with occasionally sparse to densely gland-dotted and venation ending in the margin.

In Cambodia and Vietnam, the plant tends to grow as a shrub, some 2-10m tall.

The specific density of the stem and of the wood is 0.62 g/cm^{3}.

== Distribution ==
The species is native to Southeast Asia, Wallacea, New Guinea and the Solomon Islands. Countries and regions that it grows in are: Solomon Islands; Papua New Guinea (Bismarck Archipelago, mainland); Indonesia (Papua, Nusa Tenggara, Maluku, Sulawesi, Kalimantan, Bali, Jawa, Sumatera); Philippines; Malaysia (Sabah, Sarawak, Peninsular Malaysia); Brunei Darussalam; Thailand; Cambodia; Vietnam; Laos; and Myanmar.

== Habitat, ecology ==
Mallotus floribundus is locally common in both primary and secondary forests, it grows mainly in open areas, such as river banks, alongside roads, in gaps and clearings, and in open fields. It can handle a range of soil moisture, from dry to badly-drained, even swampy areas, with most soil types tolerated, from sand to loam to clay to limestone. It grows in altitudes up 500m (rarely up to 933m).

The tallest, most impressive forests on Waigeo of the Raja Ampat Islands, eastern Indonesia, contain the species as a co-dominant, along with Spathiostemon javensis, Hopea novoguineensis, Homalium foetidum, Pimelodendron amboinicum, and Vatica rassak, with Elatostema and Piper quite common in the understorey. This forest grows on alluvial and residual sandstone and volcanic soils.

In Cambodia, the species favours flooded forests, while it is most common in secondary formations in Vietnam.

== Conservation status ==
The IUCN status Least Concern, given above, is because the tree has a large population very widely distributed and is, at the moment and in the foreseeable future, not threatened.

== Vernacular names ==
In Cambodia the shrub is known as kabahs prèi rôniëm (Khmer).

== Uses ==
In Sumatera the wood is used to make small objects, while the tree is grown as an ornamental in Myanmar. The leaves are used in an infusion that is drunk as a tea in Cambodia, where they also use the twigs of the plant for firewood.

In Jawa the male flowers, described as "rather aromatic" are mixed with rice flour to make powders used in traditional medicine. A decoction of the root is used in Peninsular Malaysia to treat fever, stomachache and cholera, and is given after child birth.

Extracts from the species have been shown to have a high antioxidant activity.

== History ==
The Swiss botanist Johann Müller (also known as Jean Müller) described this species in 1864. Müller published under the name of Johannes Müller Argoviensis (botanical abbreviation = Müll.Arg.) to distinguish himself from other botanists of the time. The publication occurred in the journal Flora; oder, (allgemeine) botanische Zeitung published in Regensburg and Jena
