= Ficus bernaysii =

Conservation status
- Least Concern (IUCN 3.1)

Scientific classification
- Kingdom: Plantae
- Clade: Tracheophytes
- Clade: Angiosperms
- Clade: Eudicots
- Clade: Rosids
- Order: Rosales
- Family: Moraceae
- Genus: Ficus
- Subgenus: F. subg. Sycomorus
- Species: F. bernaysii

Binomial name
- Ficus bernaysii King

Synonyms
- none

Species of flowering plant

Ficus bernaysii is a lowland rainforest tree in the family Moraceae, native to New Guinea, the Bismarck Archipelago, and the Solomon Islands. It is dioecious, and grows cauliflorous fruit. It is fed on by a wide range of animals.

== Taxonomy ==
Ficus bernaysii is in the section Sycocarpus of the dioecious fig subgenus Sycomorus.

The species was described by the Scottish botanist George King (1840-1909), who worked in India from 1866 to 1898. He was important in the cultivation of Cinchona and in distributing quinine. The formal description of F. bernaysii is held to be in the periodical Journal of The Asiatic Society of Bengal (Part 2: Natural History) in 1887. In his 1886/7 publication On Some New Species of Ficus from New Guinea, he states that the species is named after Mr. L. Bernays, of Brisbane, "whose efforts for the exploration of New Guinea, and for the development of his own colony of Queensland are so well-known." See Lewis Adolphus Bernays (1831-1908), public servant, for comparison.

== Description ==
Ficus bernaysii is a tree growing up to 15m tall. The leaves range from (sub)distichous to supopposite. The white to brown stipules are 0.5 to 2 cm long. The tree has abundant cauliflorous fruit growing the length of the trunk.

== Distribution ==
Ficus bernaysii is native to New Guinea, the Bismarck Archipelago and the Solomon Islands.

== Habitat and ecology ==
Ficus bernaysii often occurs in secondary regrowth patches in high densities, but also occurs in primary forest.

In the primary and old secondary forest amongst the lowland rainforest near Baitabag, Ohu and Mis villages, Madang Province, PNG., the most frequent trees were Macaranga novoguineensis, Pimelodendron amboinicum, Ficus bernaysii, Ficus phaeosyce and Ficus wassa.

The taxa is a source of food for Dobsonia minor (lesser bare-backed fruit bat) and is parasitized by the wasps Apocrypta meromassa Ulenberg 1985, and Ceratosolenm hooglandi

Ficus species have a specialised pollination system involving wasps of the Agaonidae family. In the Madang province of PNG the main pollinator is the Ceratosolen hooglandii wasp. This species of wasp also pollinates Ficus hahliana. Two other Ceratosolen species were observed pollinating F. bernaysii, though both species tended to concentrate other separate species of Ficus, Ceratosolen dentifer (who preferred Ficus hispida and Ceratosolen sp. ex Ficus morobensis (which mainly pollinated Ficus morobensis). The concentration by wasp pollinators on separate species might explain the high rates of speciation in the closely related sections, subgenera and genus of Ficus.

In the Madang area, the tree is a hotspot for the fruit bat Syconycteris australis (common blossom bat) which tends to feed on the fruit of this tree and those of Piper aduncum.

The caterpillars of the generalist moth Homona mermerodes feed on the leaves of F. bernaysii, though they favour many other taxa.

The moths Talanga sexpunctalis complex and Glyphodes margaritaria feed on the tree among other Ficus species, these are both parasitised by the wasp Colastomion masalaii, which frequents F. bernaysii.

A range of Chrysomelid beetles, from generalist to specialist to rare feeders, are associated with the plant.

Various guilds of herbivourous insects have been observed eating this taxa, including adult leaf-chewers, fruit-chewers, larval leaf-chewers, leaf-miners, phloem-suckers and xylem-suckers.
