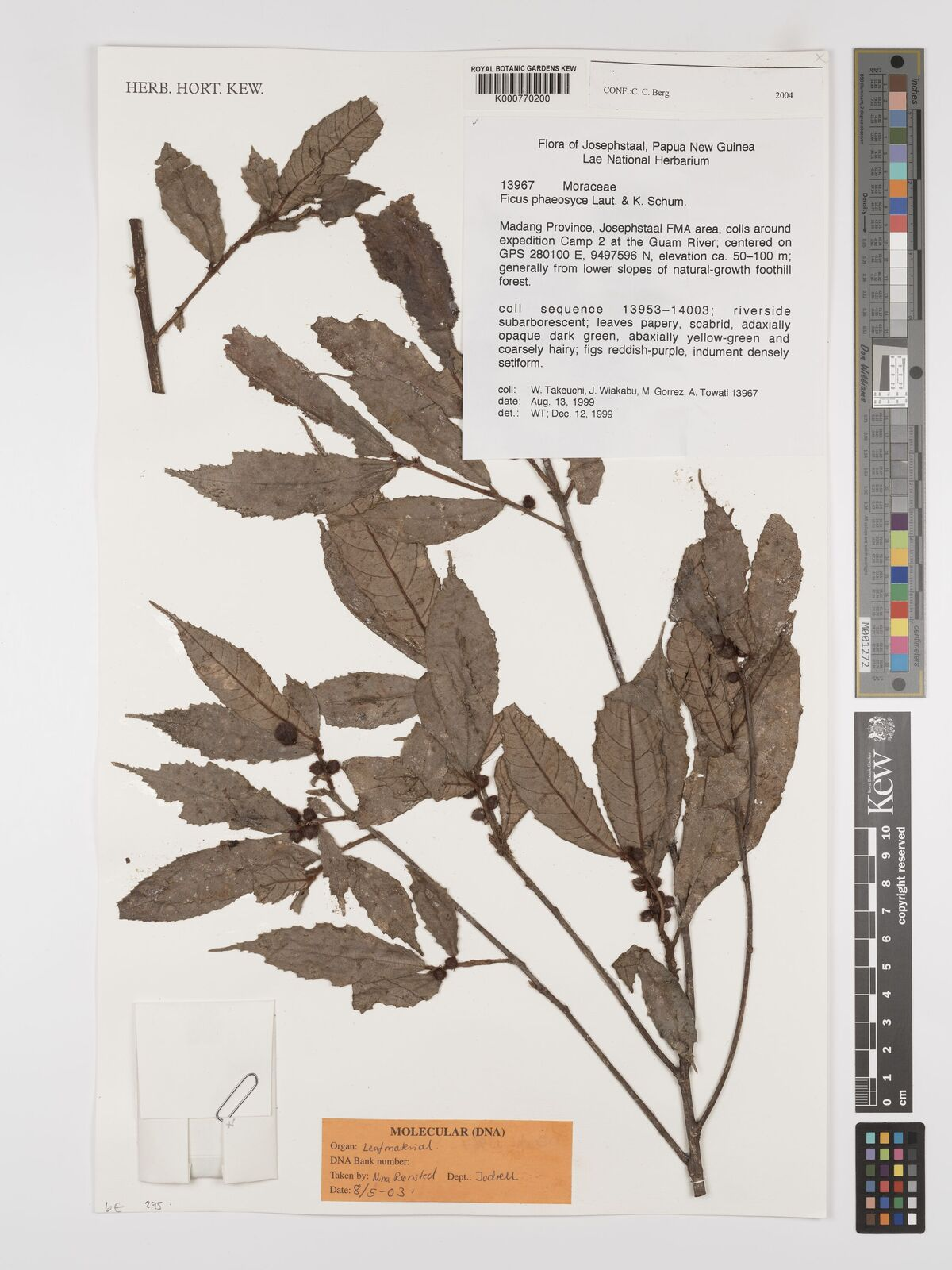

Conservation status
- Least Concern (IUCN 3.1)

Scientific classification
- Kingdom: Plantae
- Clade: Tracheophytes
- Clade: Angiosperms
- Clade: Eudicots
- Clade: Rosids
- Order: Rosales
- Family: Moraceae
- Genus: Ficus
- Subgenus: F. subg. Sycidium
- Species: F. phaeosyce

Binomial name
- Ficus phaeosyce K.Schum. & Lauterb.

Synonyms
- none

= Ficus phaeosyce =

Species of tree endemic to Papua New Guinea

Ficus phaeosyce is a species of tree in the Moraceae family. F. phaeosyce grows in eastern New Guinea, endemic to the nation of Papua Niugini. It is a shade tolerant understorey species, locally very abundant. A range of insect herbivores feed on the plant.

== Taxonomy ==
The species was described by the German botanist Karl Moritz Schumann (1851–1904), who was first chair of the Deutsche Kakteen-Gesellschaft (German Cactus Society), and the German explorer and botanist Carl Adolf Georg Lauterbach (1864–1937), who had visited Kaiser-Wilhelmsland (part of German New Guinea). They published the description in the book Flora der deutschen Schutzgebiete in der Südsee in 1900.

== Description ==
A small tree or shrub with smooth leaves.

== Distribution ==
Native to the eastern parts of the island of New Guinea, it is endemic to the nation of Papua Niugini.

== Habitat and ecology ==
It is a shade tolerant understorey species growing up to 2,000 m (6,600 ft) elevation. The taxa grows in both tropical moist lowland and montane forests. In primary and old secondary forest plots examined in Madang Province, PNG, this tree was co-dominant along with Macaranga novoguineensis, Pimelodendron sp., Ficus bernaysii, and Ficus wassa. It favours late successional stages, but is found occasionally in early successional stages. A single Choreutis sp. of moth made up over 30% of invertebrate herbivores hosted on the species. This is a relatively high host specialization for the area.

In a survey of 191 individuals of the tree in Madang province found 427 insect herbivores from 73 species, it was one of the 3 species that had the most sap-sucking insect species (the two others being Ficus conocephalifolia and Ficus wassa). In this area it is one of the most abundant understorey taxa, alongside F. conocephalifolia and F. wassa, F. phaeosyce had some 4552 individuals per square kilometre. Leaf expansion took on average 33 days, higher that the average leaf expansion time (24 days), but typical of shade tolerant species slowness. Latex outflow was relatively low

Guilds of insect herbivores that have been found on the species include adult leaf-chewers, larval leaf-chewers, leaf-miners, leaf-suckers, phloem-suckers, and xylem-suckers.

The generalist moth Homona mermerodes is one of the species of Homona that feed on the plant, though it is not very favoured by H. mermerodes.

The micromoth Niveas kone, in the metalmark moth family Choreutidae feeds on the tree.

== Conservation ==
The plant has a conservation rating of Least Concern from the IUCN, because it is a widespread common species with a stable population. However it is not found in protected areas and its habitat is under threat from a continuing decline in area, extent and/or quality, and the population of the tree is severely fragmented and experiencing continuing decline of mature individuals.
