= Macaranga novoguineensis =

Scientific classification
- Kingdom: Plantae
- Clade: Tracheophytes
- Clade: Angiosperms
- Clade: Eudicots
- Clade: Rosids
- Order: Malpighiales
- Family: Euphorbiaceae
- Genus: Macaranga
- Species: M. novoguineensis

Binomial name
- Macaranga novoguineensis J.J.Sm.

Synonyms
- Macaranga novoguineensis var. glabra Whitmore

Species of plant in the family Euphorbiaceae from New Britain and New Guinea

Macaranga novoguineensis is a species of tree in the Euphorbiaceae family. It is native to New Britain and New Guinea. It is a late succession plant, and supports a variety of insect herbivores, including caterpillars from the moth Homona mermerodes.

== Distribution ==
This species is only found in New Britain and New Guinea. Countries in which it occurs are Papua Niugini (PNG) and Indonesia.

== Habitat and ecology ==
The species is a late succession plant, most common in primary forest, but also in old secondary growth. In primary and old secondary forest plots examined in Madang Province, PNG, this tree was co-dominant along with Pimelodendron sp., Ficus bernaysii, Ficus phaeosyce and Ficus wassa. This species, along with other Macaranga species, were more palatable (had more insects feeding on them) than Ficus species, and this tree was unusual amongst late succession plants in having a wide range of herbivores hosted.

The plant is a host for a variety of insect herbivores, that include adult and larvae leaf-chewers and leaf-miners.

== History ==
This species was first described by the Nederlander botanist Johannes Jacobus Smith (1867–1947), who spent 33 year in Jawa, the last 11 years of which was as curator of the then Buitenzorg Botanical Gardens (now Bogor B.G.). Smith primarily worked on orchids, but described many other plants, including Euphorbiaceae. His description of M. novoguineensis was in 1912 in the publication Nova Guinea; a Journal of Botany, Zoology, Anthropology, Ethnography, Geology and Palaeontology of the Papuan Region (Leiden).
