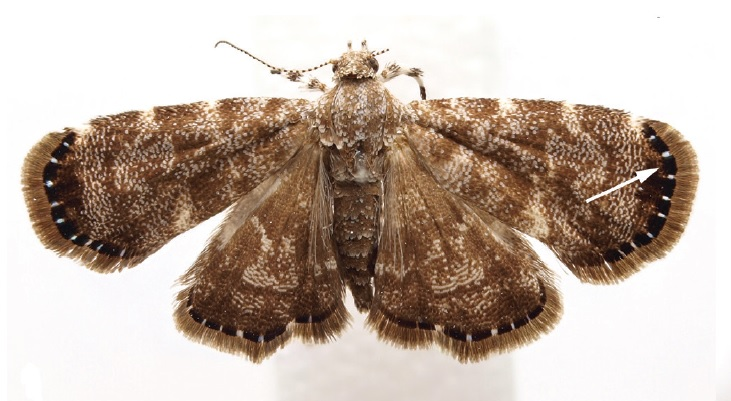

Scientific classification
- Domain: Eukaryota
- Kingdom: Animalia
- Phylum: Arthropoda
- Class: Insecta
- Order: Lepidoptera
- Family: Choreutidae
- Genus: Niveas
- Species: N. kone

Binomial name
- Niveas kone Rota, 2013

= Niveas kone =

Species of moth

Niveas kone is a moth of the family Choreutidae. It is found in Papua New Guinea and on the Solomon Islands.

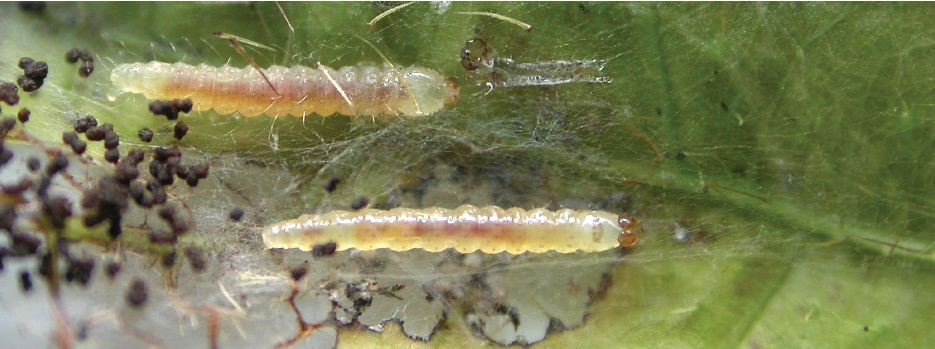
Larvae

The fore- and hindwings have a brown background colour, speckled with white-tipped scales in an irregular pattern. There is a distinct black band along the termen of both wings, within which are more or less equidistant white spots.

The larvae have been recorded feeding on Ficus botryocarpa, Ficus nodosa, Ficus phaeosyce, Ficus pungens, Ficus variegata and Ficus wassa.

== Etymology ==
The species is named after the Finnish Kone Foundation.
