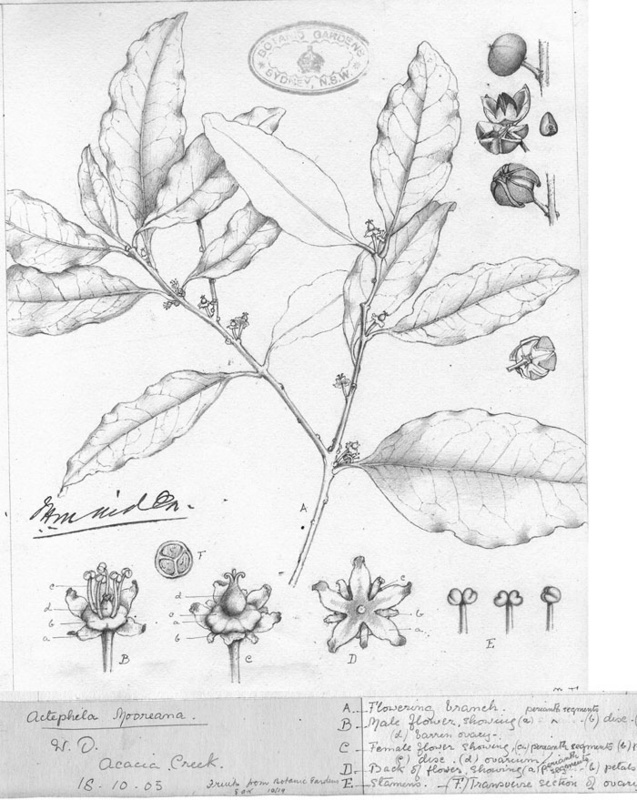
- drawing by Margaret Flockton

Conservation status
- Least Concern (IUCN 3.1)

Scientific classification
- Kingdom: Plantae
- Clade: Tracheophytes
- Clade: Angiosperms
- Clade: Eudicots
- Clade: Rosids
- Order: Malpighiales
- Family: Phyllanthaceae
- Genus: Actephila
- Species: A. lindleyi

Binomial name
- Actephila lindleyi (Steud.) Airy Shaw

Synonyms
- Actephila mooreana Baill.; Actephila nitida (Müll.Arg.) Benth. & Hook.f. ex Drake; Lithoxylon lindleyi Steud.; Lithoxylon nitidum Müll.Arg.; Securinega nitida W.T.Aiton

= Actephila lindleyi =

Species of flowering plant

Actephila lindleyi is a species of plant in the family Phyllanthaceae. It is a shrub or small tree that can grow up to 12 metres tall. Found in tropical, subtropical and dry rainforest in coastal areas north from Shoalhaven Gorge in New South Wales to Papua New Guinea and adjacent islands in the north. In New South Wales this species grows on a variety of different soils, such as andesites, basalts or metamorphics from elevations of 40 to 500 metres above sea level. A rare species in the Illawarra region at the southern part of its range.

== Description ==
=== Trunk and branchlets ===
The trunk is crooked, mostly cylindrical though occasionally angled or buttressed. Bark is reddish black with vertical rows of lenticles. The timber is suited to turnery, the wood being fairly hard and close grained. Branchlets are thick smooth and brown, with pale lenticles. Leaf scars may be present.

=== Leaves ===
Alternate on the stem, not toothed. Lance shaped, sometimes broad lance shape. Drawn out to a point at the tip. Thick, glossy green above, paler below. 7 to 18 cm long, 2.5 to 4 cm wide. Leaf stalks are channelled above, 6 to 25 mm long. Only the midrib is prominent. Other veins less obvious, but raised on both sides of the leaf. 6 to 10 lateral veins mostly straight, though curved near the leaf margin.

=== Flowers and fruit ===
Creamy flowers form from leaf axils from August to November. Stalks are from 6 to 25 mm long. Petals are particularly small. The red brown capsule is mostly globular in shape and three lobed. Ripening from April to September, eaten by the brown cuckoo-dove. Horticultural regeneration of this species is advisable by cuttings, which strike easily. Fresh seeds germinate after 10 to 31 days, with an 80% success rate.

== Taxonomy & naming ==
Specimens described by Airy Shaw were variable and collections identified as this species are now included under different taxa. Such as A. grandifolia (in New South Wales), A. flavescens, A. traceyi, A. venusta and A. vernicosa in Queensland.

Actephila means fond of the sea shore, derived from the Greek language "acte" meaning the sea shore and "philos" fond. The specific epithet is in honour of the botanist John Lindley. The type specimen for the synonym Actephila mooreana was collected by Charles Moore at the Richmond River and Mount Lindesay in 1861. This plant first appeared in botanic literature as Lithoxylon lindleyi, in the Nomenclator Botanicus, second edition of 1841. Published by the German doctor Ernst Gottlieb von Steudel.
