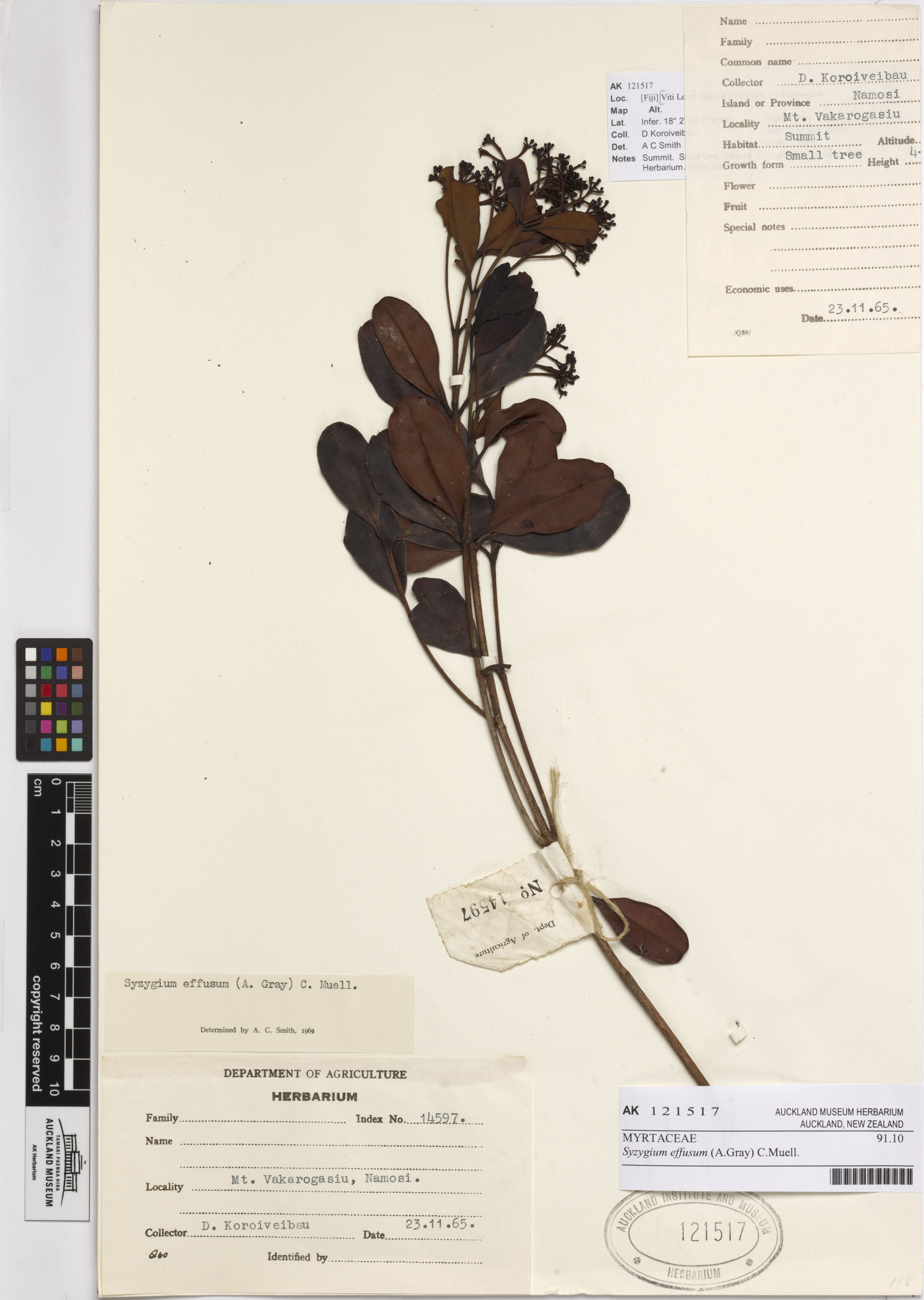

Conservation status
- Least Concern (IUCN 3.1)

Scientific classification
- Kingdom: Plantae
- Clade: Embryophytes
- Clade: Tracheophytes
- Clade: Angiosperms
- Clade: Eudicots
- Clade: Rosids
- Order: Myrtales
- Family: Myrtaceae
- Genus: Syzygium
- Species: S. effusum

Binomial name
- Syzygium effusum (A.Gray) Müll.Berol. (1858)

Synonyms
- Eugenia effusa A.Gray (1854); Eugenia nivifera Greves (1923); Eugenia sylvana Ridl. (1916); Jambosa arfakensis Gibbs (1917); Syzygium doctersii Merr. & L.M.Perry (1942); Syzygium leucoderme Diels (1922); Syzygium niviferum (Greves) Merr. & L.M.Perry (1942); Syzygium obtusum Merr. & L.M.Perry (1942); Syzygium sylvanum (Ridl.) Merr. & L.M.Perry (1942)

= Syzygium effusum =

Species of flowering plant

Syzygium effusum is a species of flowering plant in the myrtle family, Myrtaceae. It is a tree native to Fiji, New Guinea, the Santa Cruz Islands, and the Solomon Islands.

In New Guinea Syzygium effusum grows in both lowland and montane forests, from sea level up to 2,800 meters elevation. the upper Ok Tedi watershed in the highlands of New Guinea Syzygium effusum is, with Syzygium versteegii, the most common canopy species in primary lower montane rain forest above 1000 meters elevation, accompanied by the trees Buchanania macrocarpa, Campnosperma brevipetiolatum, Caldcluvia nymannii, Pimeleodendron amboinicum, Planchonella and Calophyllum species.
