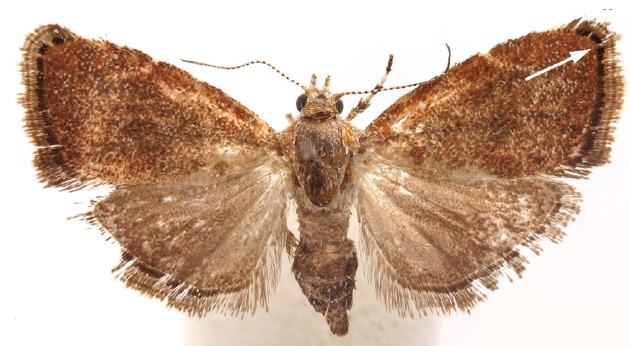
- Niveas agassizi

Scientific classification
- Domain: Eukaryota
- Kingdom: Animalia
- Phylum: Arthropoda
- Class: Insecta
- Order: Lepidoptera
- Family: Choreutidae
- Subfamily: Choreutinae
- Genus: Niveas; Rota, 2013

= Niveas =

Genus of moths

Niveas is a genus of moths in the family Choreutidae.

== Distribution ==
The genus is known from Kenya, Papua New Guinea and the Solomon Islands.

== Species ==
- Niveas agassizi Rota, 2013
- Niveas kone Rota, 2013

== Etymology ==
The generic name is derived from Latin niveum (meaning snowy) and refers to the speckles of white-tipped scales on the wings of the type species.
