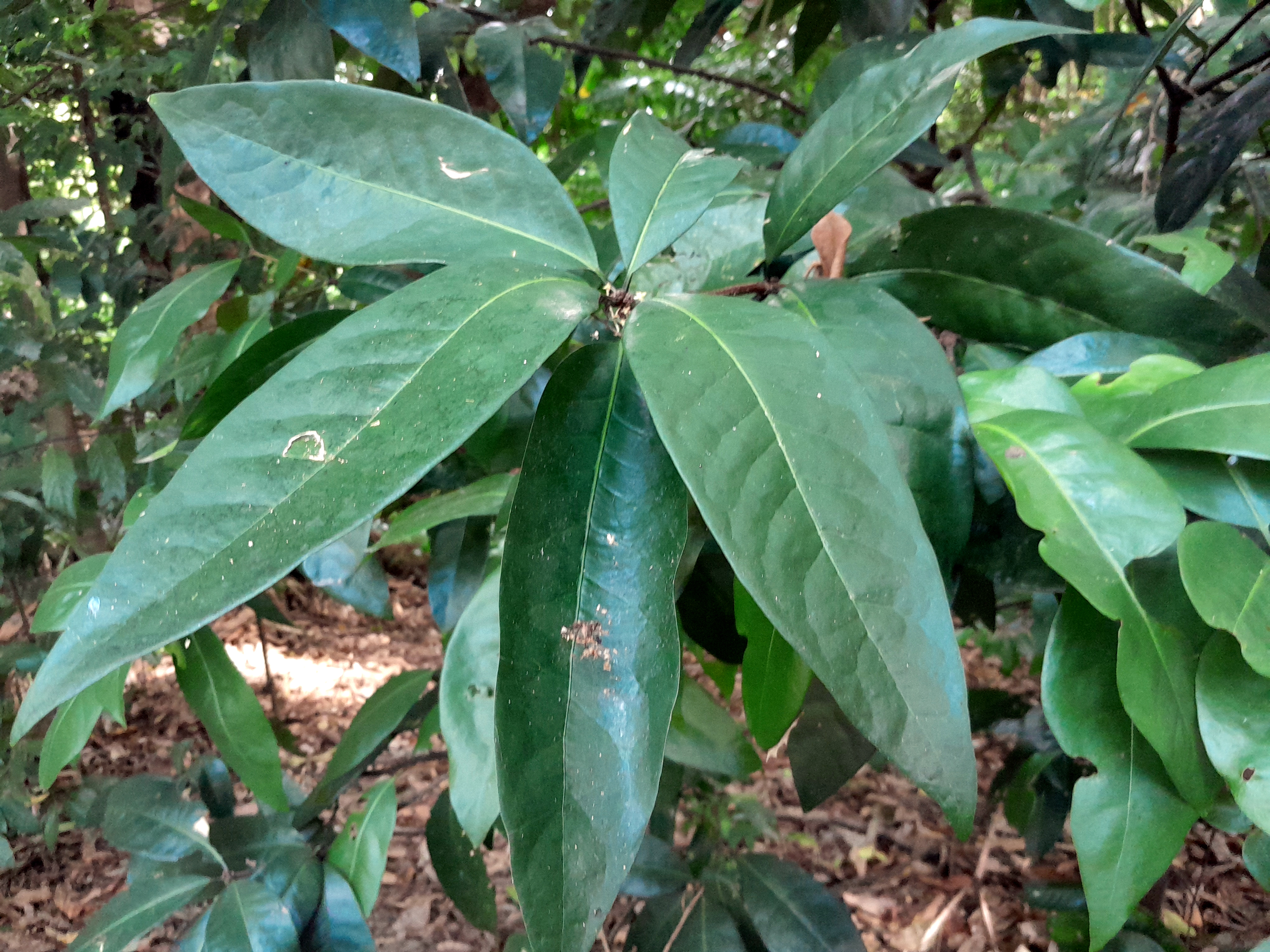
- In Cairns Botanic Gardens, November 2023

Conservation status
- Vulnerable (NCA)

Scientific classification
- Kingdom: Plantae
- Clade: Tracheophytes
- Clade: Angiosperms
- Clade: Eudicots
- Clade: Rosids
- Order: Malpighiales
- Family: Phyllanthaceae
- Genus: Actephila
- Species: A. foetida

Binomial name
- Actephila foetida Domin

= Actephila foetida =

Species of flowering plant

Actephila foetida is a plant in the family Phyllanthaceae that is found only in a very restricted range within the Wet Tropics bioregion of Queensland, Australia. It was first described in 1927.

== Description ==
Actephila foetida is an evergreen shrub growing to about 2 to 3 m (6 ft 7 in to 9 ft 10 in) tall. The large fleshy leaves can reach 40 cm (16 in) long and 22 cm (8.7 in) wide, with a petiole about 8–9 cm (3.1–3.5 in) long. they are dark green above and paler below, and the lateral veins are distinct on both surfaces.

Flowers are about 4 mm (0.16 in) diameter and produced from wart-like growths on the twigs. Male flowers have five sepals about 2.5 mm (0.10 in) long and no petals, the stamens emerge from a white, irregularly five-lobed disc. Female flowers have a bi-lobed stigma emerging from the centre of the disc. The fruit is a capsule about 13 mm (0.51 in) long and 20 mm (0.79 in) diameter.

=== Phenology ===
This species flowers and fruits from November to March.

== Taxonomy ==
This species was first described by the Czech botanist Karel Domin in 1927, based on material he collected himself in 1909 at Harvey's Creek, about 50 km (31 mi) south of Cairns.

=== Etymology ===
The generic name Actephila comes from the Greek aktḗ, coast, and phileo, to love. The species epithet foetida comes from Latin and means evil-smelling. It is a reference to the odour produced by the male flowers.

== Distribution and habitat ==
Actephila foetida is found in two widely separated populations, one each to the north and south of Cairns. The northern population occurs in the Cow Bay area between the Daintree River and Cape Tribulation, and the southern population occurs between Harvey Creek and Babinda. The species' total area of occupancy is just 28 km^{2} (11 sq mi). (Note: For a definition of Area of Occupancy see this page at the Atlas of Living Australia) The plant grows in undisturbed rainforest as an understorey shrub, at altitudes from sea level to about 100 m (330 ft).

== Conservation ==
This species is listed by the Queensland Government's Department of Environment, Science and Innovation as vulnerable. As of 20 March 2024, it has not been assessed by the International Union for Conservation of Nature (IUCN).

== Gallery ==
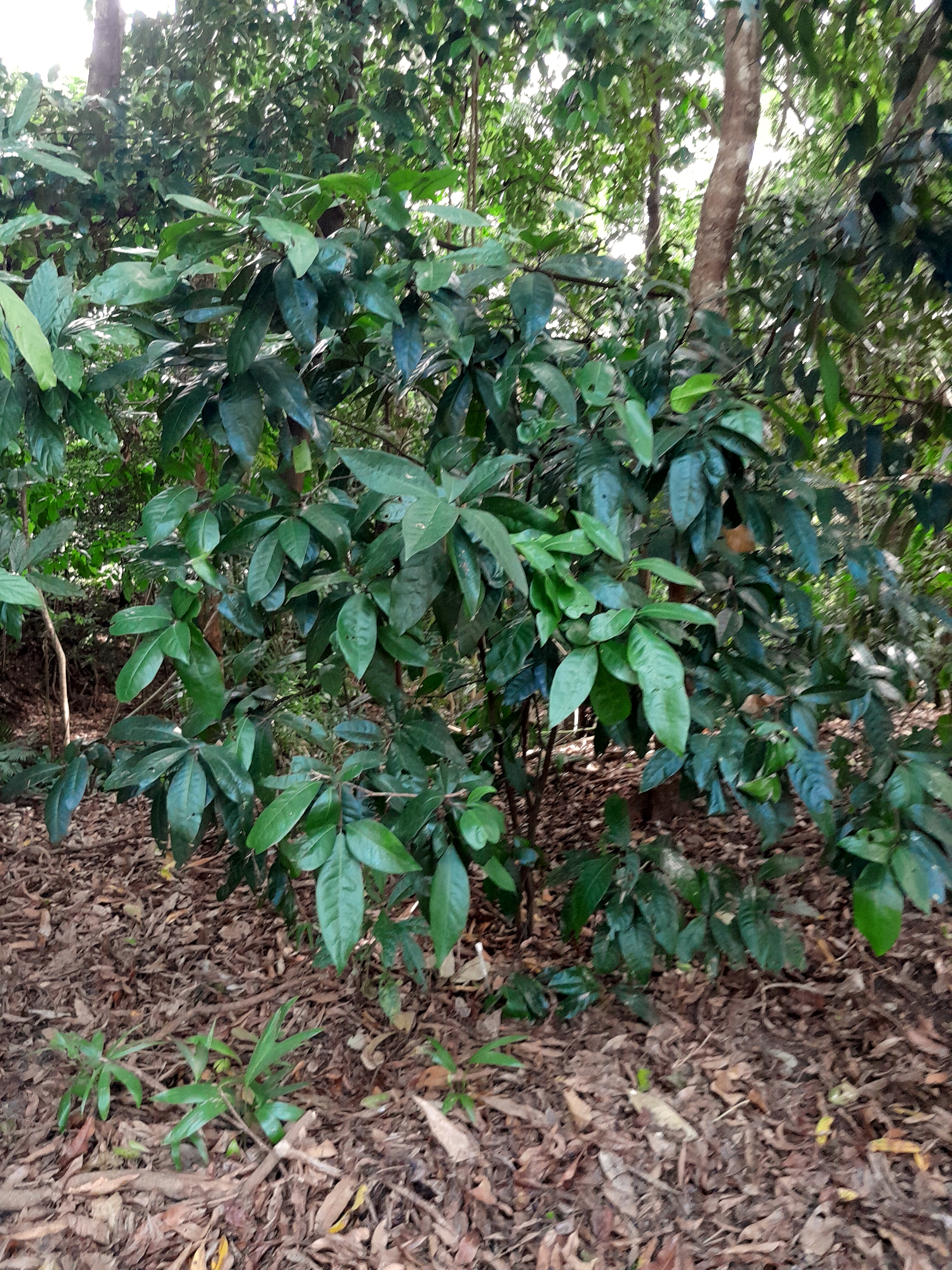
Habit

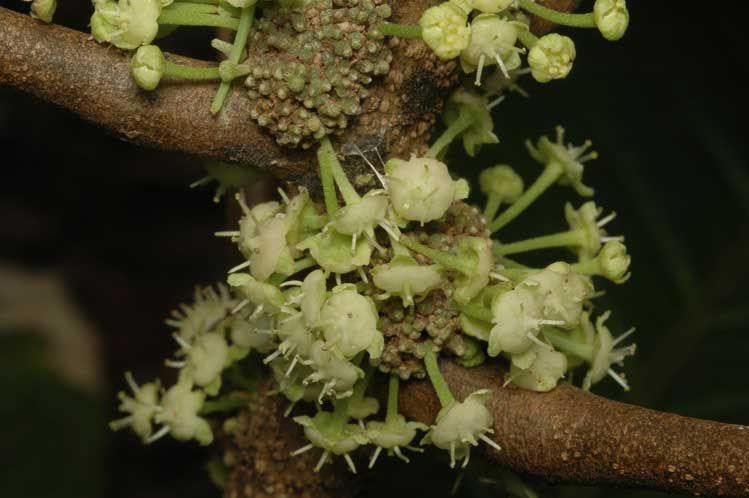
Male flowers

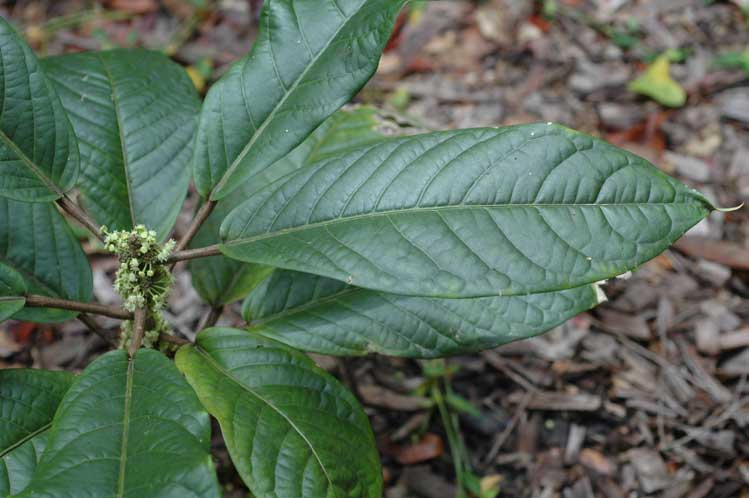
Foliage and flowers

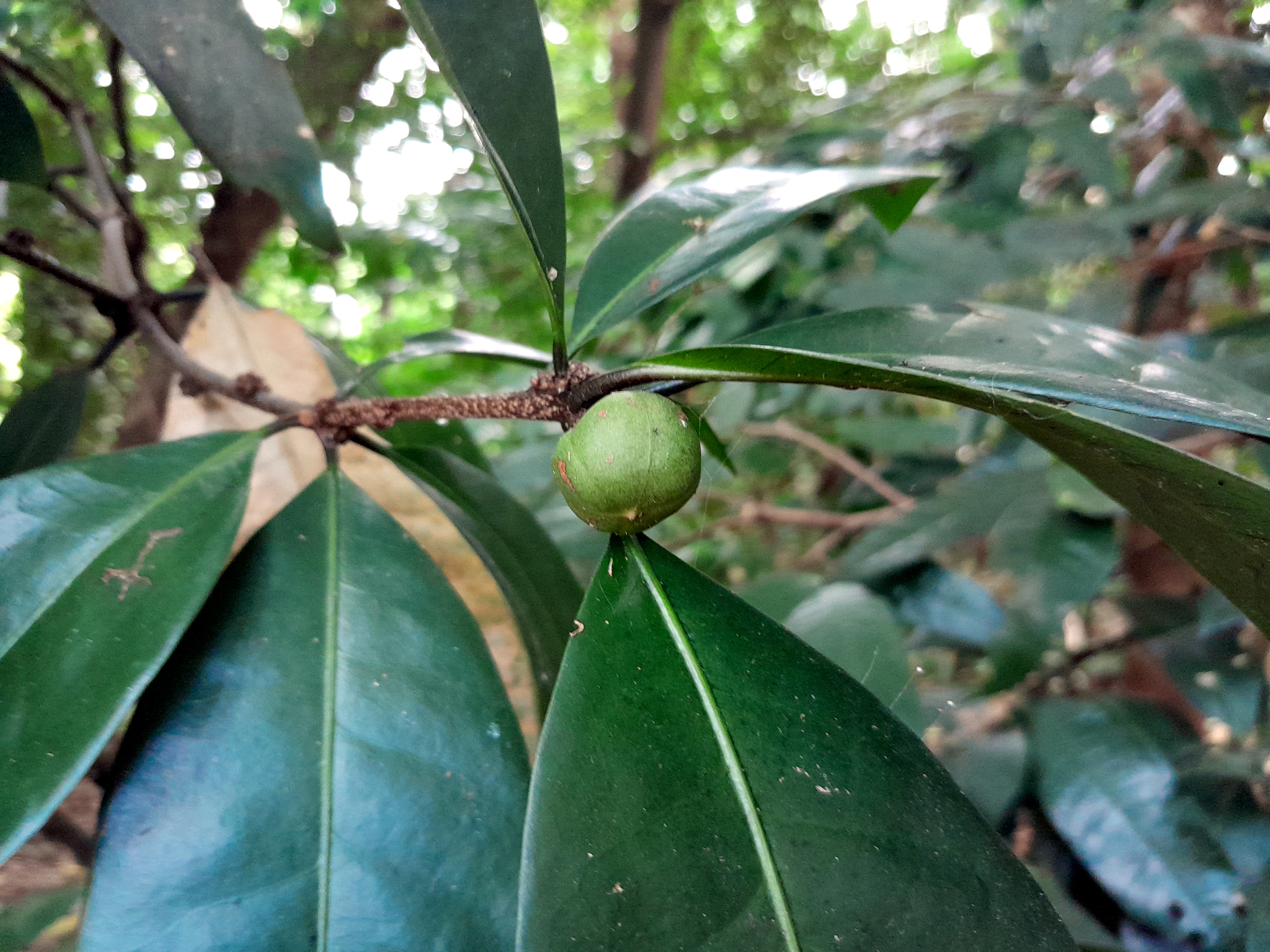
Fruit

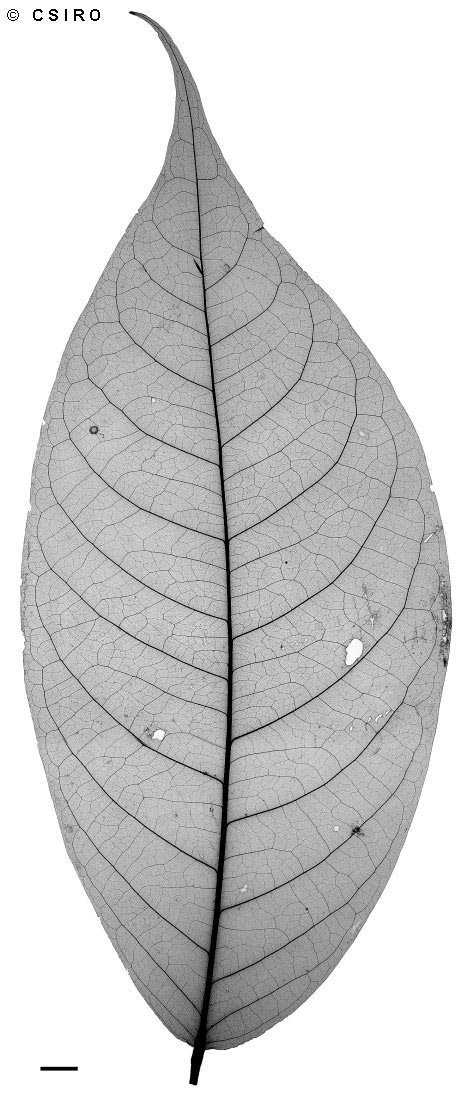
X-ray of leaf
