= Actephila mooreana =

- near Wauchope, New South Wales

Scientific classification
- Kingdom: Plantae
- Clade: Tracheophytes
- Clade: Angiosperms
- Clade: Eudicots
- Clade: Rosids
- Order: Malpighiales
- Family: Phyllanthaceae
- Genus: Actephila
- Species: A. mooreana

Binomial name
- Actephila mooreana Baill.

Synonyms
- Acetephila lindleyi

Species of plant

Actephila mooreana is a species of plant in the family Phyllanthaceae. A shrub to small tree, from two metres to six metres tall, found in Australia in eastern New South Wales to eastern Queensland. The plant was first collected for botanical science by Charles Moore at Mount Lindesay, on the border of the states of Queensland and New South Wales.
