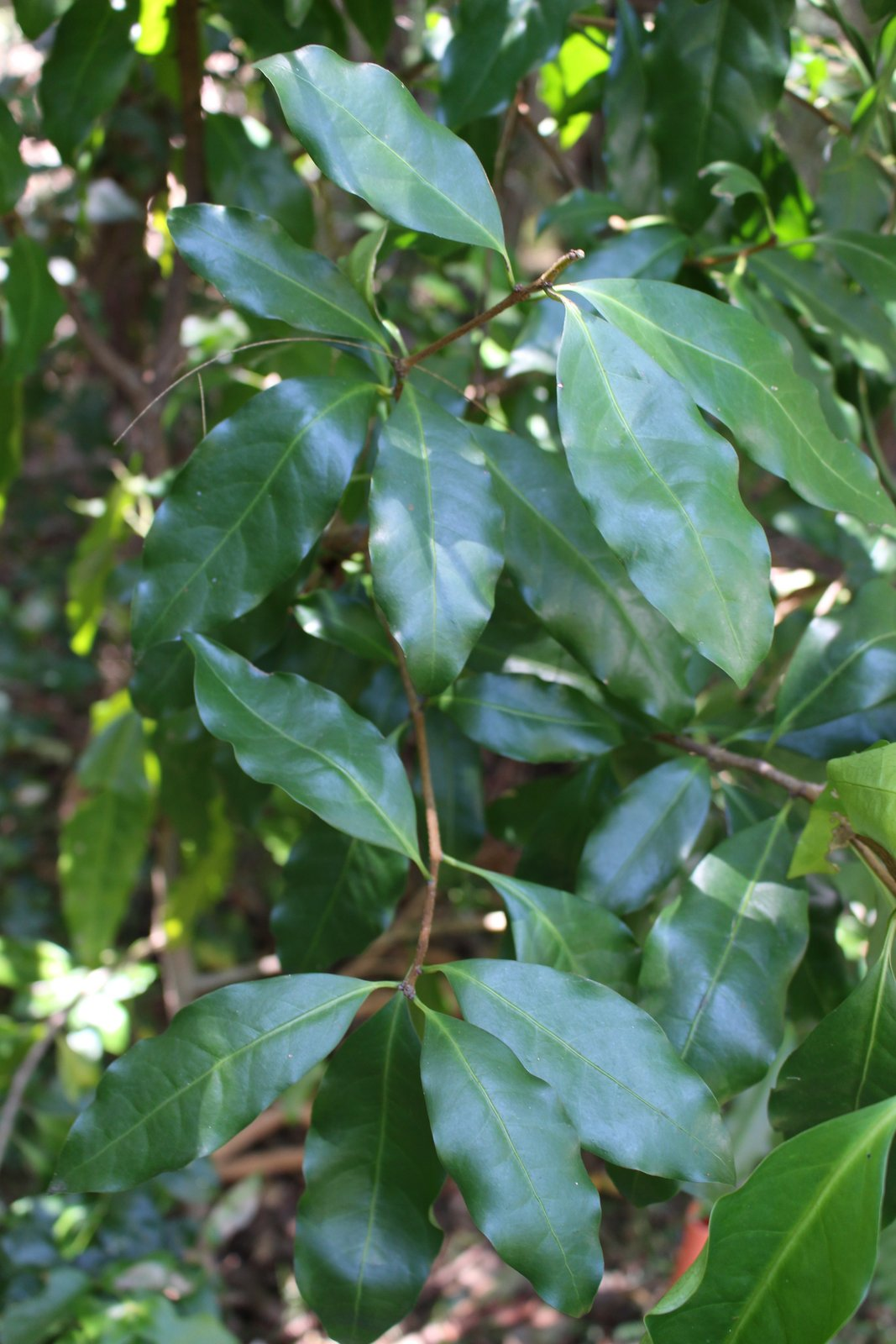

Scientific classification
- Kingdom: Plantae
- Clade: Embryophytes
- Clade: Tracheophytes
- Clade: Spermatophytes
- Clade: Angiosperms
- Clade: Eudicots
- Clade: Rosids
- Order: Malpighiales
- Family: Phyllanthaceae
- Genus: Actephila
- Species: A. grandifolia

Binomial name
- Actephila grandifolia (Müll.Arg.) Baill.

= Actephila grandifolia =

Species of plant

Actephila grandifolia is a species of plant in the family Phyllanthaceae. A shrub to 3 metres tall, found in Australia in north eastern New South Wales to south eastern Queensland. The habitat is the understorey of sub tropical rainforest or moist eucalyptus forest on basalt soils.
