= Elatostema grande =

Scientific classification
- Kingdom: Plantae
- Clade: Tracheophytes
- Clade: Angiosperms
- Clade: Eudicots
- Clade: Rosids
- Order: Rosales
- Family: Urticaceae
- Genus: Elatostema
- Species: E. grande

Binomial name
- Elatostema grande (Wedd.) P.S.Green (1990)

Synonyms
- Elatostema sessile var. grande Wedd. 295 (1856); Elatostema reticulatum var. grande (Wedd.) Benth. (1873)

Species of flowering plant

Elatostema grande is a flowering plant in the nettle family. The specific epithet alludes to the relatively large leaves and inflorescences.

== Description ==
It is a fleshy, perennial herb straggling to 50 cm (20 in). The broadly and obliquely oblanceolate-elliptic leaves are usually 80–180 cm (31–71 in) long and 35–90 mm (1.4–3.5 in) wide. The male inflorescences are 15–25 mm (0.59–0.98 in) in diameter, on 10–60 mm (0.39–2.36 in) peduncles; the female inflorescences are 10–15 mm (0.39–0.59 in) in diameter

== Distribution and habitat ==
The species is endemic to Australia’s subtropical Lord Howe Island in the Tasman Sea. It is uncommon but widespread in the southern forests of the island, with a preference for mesic habitats.
