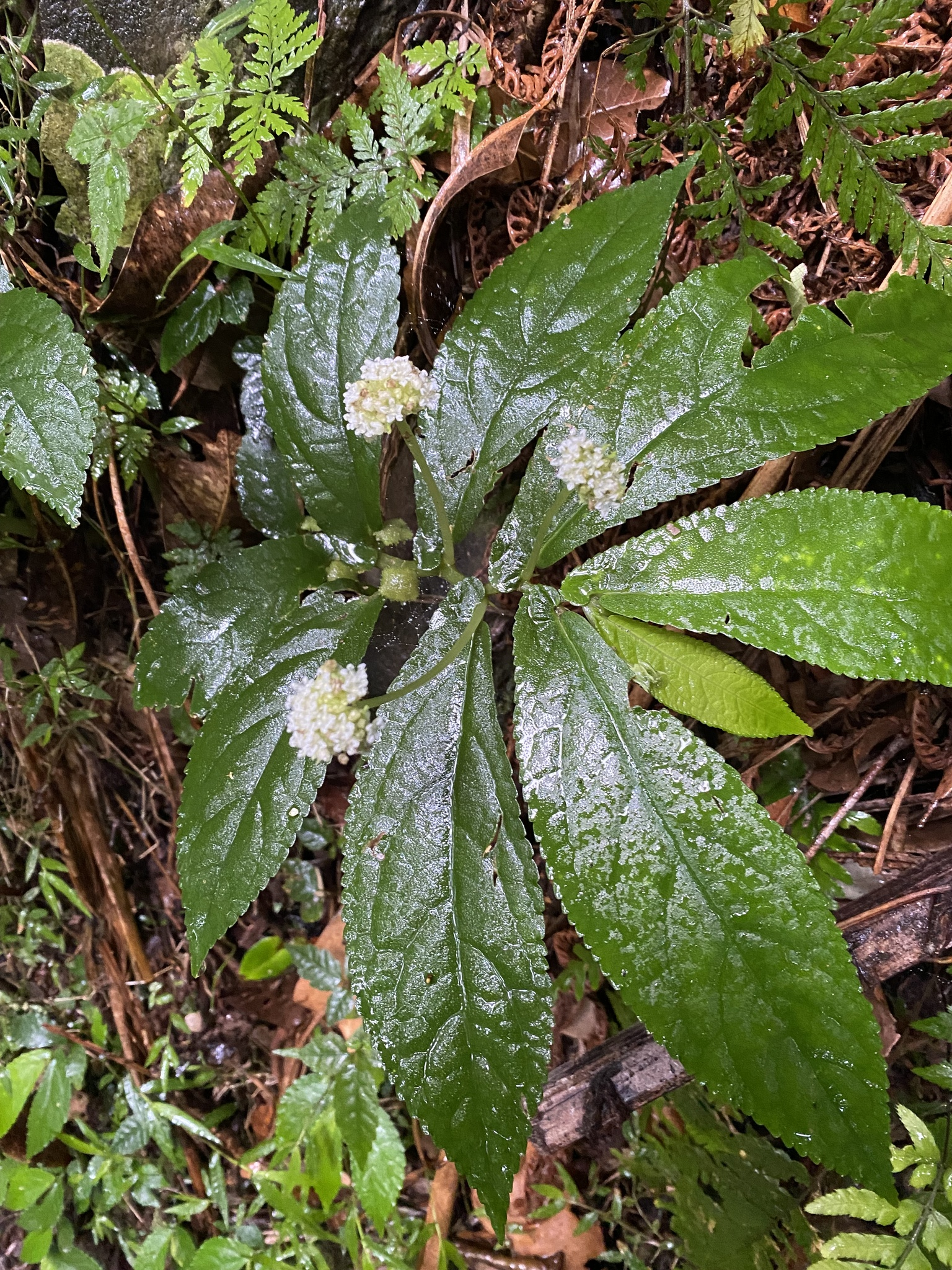
- Main Range National Park

Conservation status
- Least Concern (NCA)

Scientific classification
- Kingdom: Plantae
- Clade: Tracheophytes
- Clade: Angiosperms
- Clade: Eudicots
- Clade: Rosids
- Order: Rosales
- Family: Urticaceae
- Genus: Elatostema
- Species: E. reticulatum

Binomial name
- Elatostema reticulatum Wedd.

Synonyms
- Elatostema reticulatum var. glabrum Domin; Elatostema reticulatum var. minus Domin; Elatostema reticulatum var. sessile Benth.

= Elatostema reticulatum =

Rainforest spinach

Species of plant in the family Urticaceae

Elatostema reticulatum, commonly known as rainforest spinach, is a plant in the nettle family Urticaceae endemic to eastern areas of Queensland and New South Wales. It is a course straggly herb growing to 50–100 cm (20–39 in) high, and may form dense mats on the forest floor. It prefers wet shaded areas in rainforest and wet sclerophyll forest, and is often found in and beside streams as well as on wet rock faces. The natural range of the plant is from near Batemans Bay in the south to the ranges and tablelands near Cairns in the north.

This species was first described in 1854 by the English-French botanist Hugh Algernon Weddell, who published his paper in the journal Annales des Sciences Naturelles. The specific epithet reticulatum is a reference to the prominent reticulate venation of the leaves.

Joan Cribb suggests the stems and young leaves are edible, and taste better than spinach.

== Gallery ==
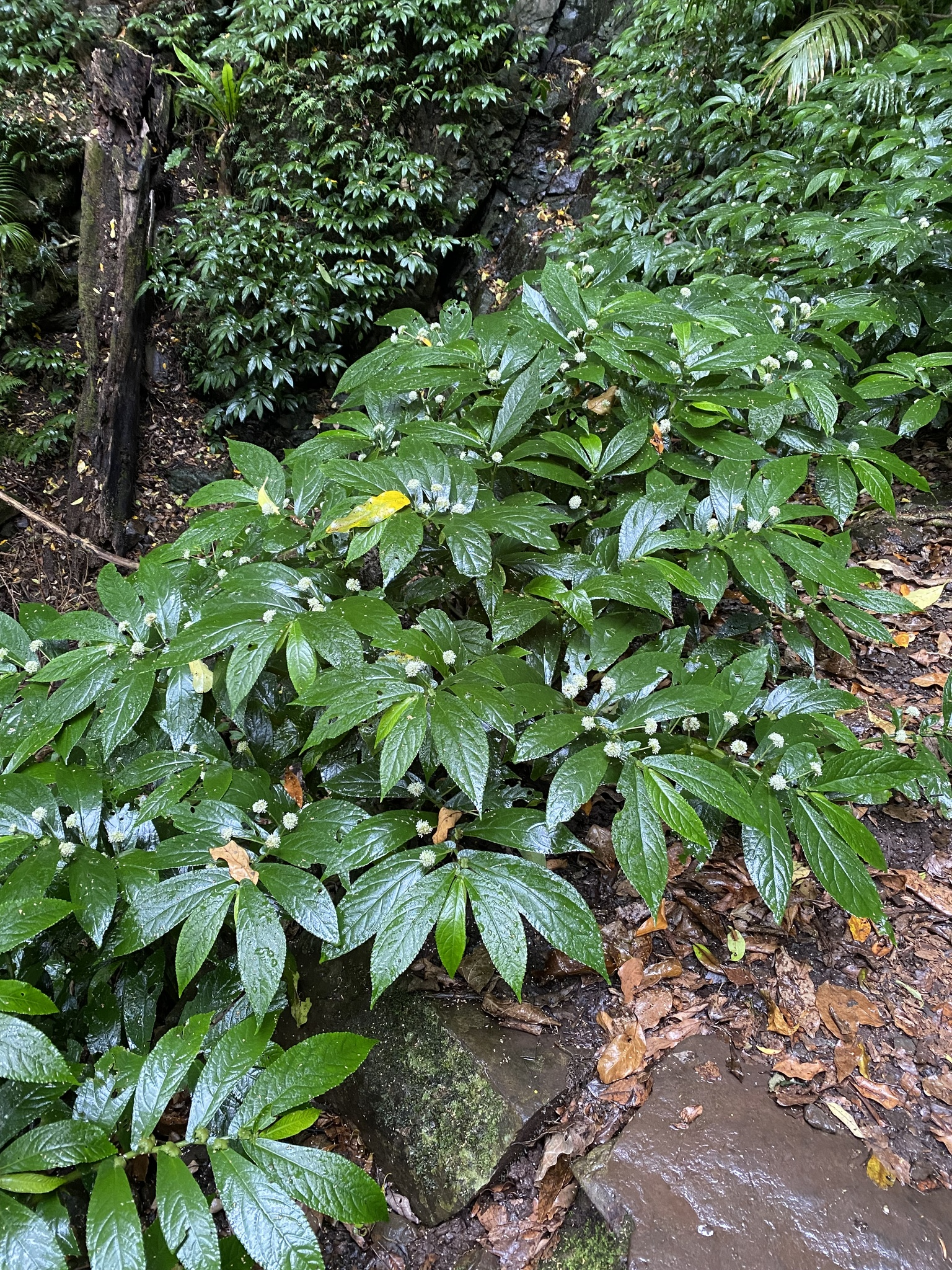
Habit

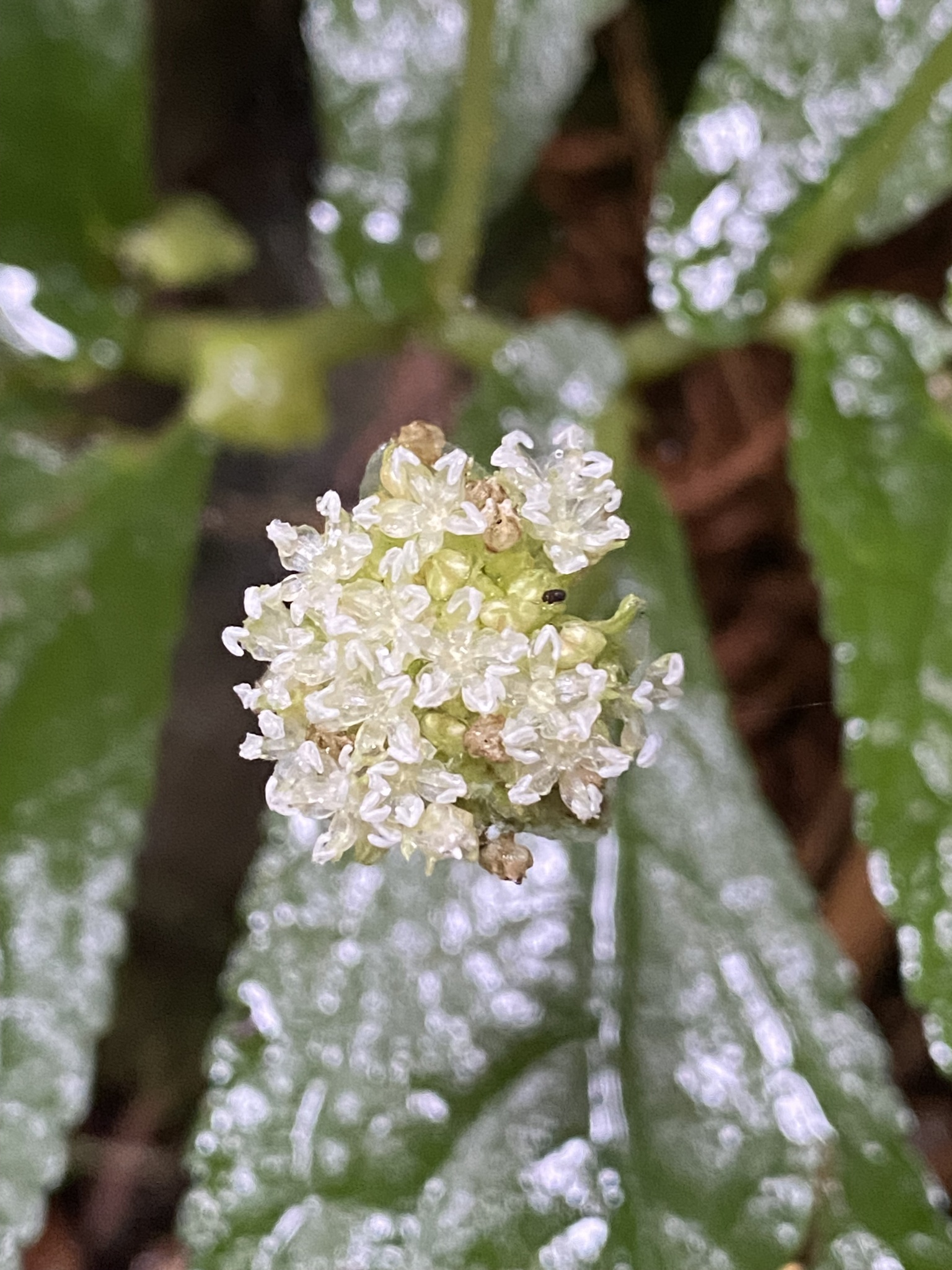
Flowers

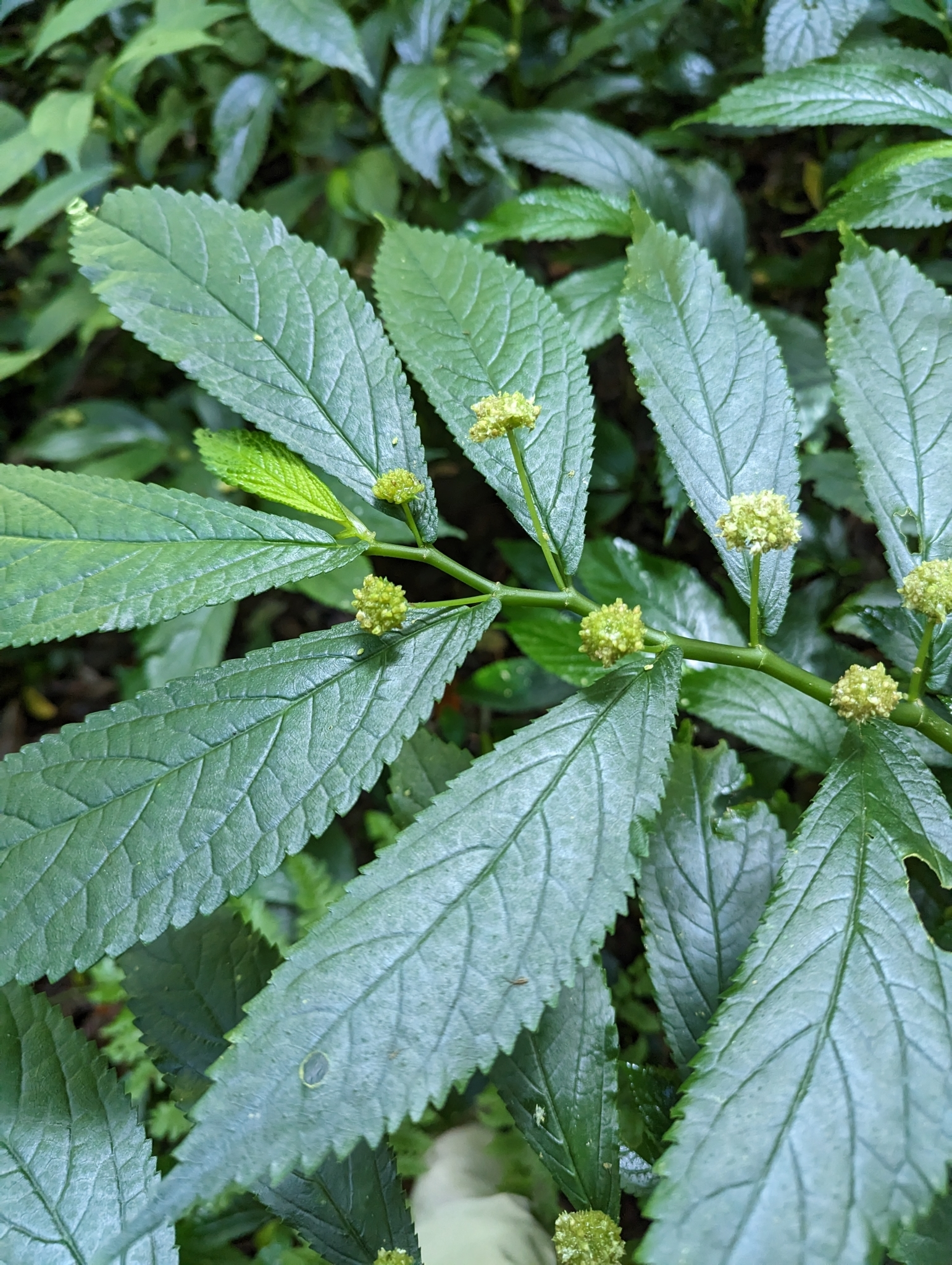
Foliage and flowers
