= Elatostema montanum =

Conservation status
- Critically endangered (EPBC Act)

Scientific classification
- Kingdom: Plantae
- Clade: Embryophytes
- Clade: Tracheophytes
- Clade: Spermatophytes
- Clade: Angiosperms
- Clade: Eudicots
- Clade: Rosids
- Order: Rosales
- Family: Urticaceae
- Genus: Elatostema
- Species: E. montanum

Binomial name
- Elatostema montanum Endl.

Synonyms
- Procris montana (Endl.) Steud., 1841

Species of flowering plant in the nettle family

Elatostema montanum, also known as the mountain procris, is a flowering plant in the nettle family. It is endemic to the Australian external territory of Norfolk Island in the south-west Pacific Ocean. It was originally described in 1833 by Austrian botanist Stephan Endlicher.

== Description ==
The species is a fleshy, perennial herb or low shrub, growing up to 1 m in height, with a straggling habit.

== Distribution and habitat ==
Plants are found within the Norfolk Island National Park in the Mount Pitt area, growing in damp shade in moist locations in palm valley forest. It was formerly more common; its conservation status has been assessed as Critically Endangered, and it is threatened by competition with invasive weeds.
