= Buchanania macrocarpa =

Conservation status
- Least Concern (IUCN 3.1)

Scientific classification
- Kingdom: Plantae
- Clade: Tracheophytes
- Clade: Angiosperms
- Clade: Eudicots
- Clade: Rosids
- Order: Sapindales
- Family: Anacardiaceae
- Genus: Buchanania
- Species: B. macrocarpa

Binomial name
- Buchanania macrocarpa Lauterb.

Synonyms
- Buchanania mollis Lauterb.; Buchanania montana Lauterb.

Species of tree in the Anacardiaceae family

A tree in the Anacardiaceae family, Buchanania macrocarpa is native to an area in the southwest Pacific from the Solomon Islands to the northern Maluku Islands.

== Description ==
The tree has greyish-black, quite thick, scaly dead bark, while the living bark is red when a cut is made. There is a large drooping crown with horizontal branches.

== Distribution ==
The plant is native to an area from the Solomon Islands to the northern Maluku islands. Countries and regions that it occurs in are: Solomon Islands; Papua Niugini (PNG, including Bismarck Archipelago); Indonesia (West Papua, northern Maluku Islands).

== Habitat and ecology ==
The species favours wet or marshy places.

In the forests around the Hindenberg Wall, PNG, this tree is common in the primary lower montane forest at 1495–1770m altitude. This type of forest has a canopy dominated by Syzygium versteegii and S. effusum, with other common canopy taxa being B. macrocarpa, Campnosperma brevipetiolatum, Opocunonia nymanii, Pimelodendron amboinicum, Planchonella and Calophyllum trees while scattered individuals of Pandanus are another characteristic of the forest type.

In the Crater Mountain Wildlife Management Area, Eastern Highlands Province, PNG, within hill forest, the species provides food for the cockatoo Probosciger aterrimus, (Palm cockatoo).

In the village forests of Negeri Saleman, north Seram Island, Indonesia, the tree occurs as a shade tree in Theobroma cacao/cacoa and coffee plantations and in forest harvested for resin. It also grows in the secondary forest of the area.

== Vernacular names ==
- top, Yachai people of Mappi Regency, West Papua.
- ketapang hutan (Indonesian language, Negeri Saleman, north Seram Island)

== Uses ==
The Yachai people of Mappi Regency, West Papua, use the good quality wood to make medium-sized boats.

The people of Negeri Saleman, north Seram Island, Indonesia use the wood for a variety of house construction elements, including the framework, roof supports and frames, ridges and doors, as well as a shade tree in plantations.

== History ==
The species was first described by the German botanist and explorer Carl Adolf Georg Lauterbach (1864–1937), who explored at the end of the Nineteenth Century the area then known as Kaiser-Wilhelmsland (part of German New Guinea, now part of Papua Niugini). He described the taxa in 1920 in the periodical Botanische Jahrbücher für Systematik, Pflanzengeschichte und Pflanzengeographie (Leipzig).

== Taxonomic note ==
There is a similarly named taxa Buchanania macrocarpa Merr. ex Setch., which this is not, the Merrill taxa is now a synonym for Buchanania merrillii Christoph.
