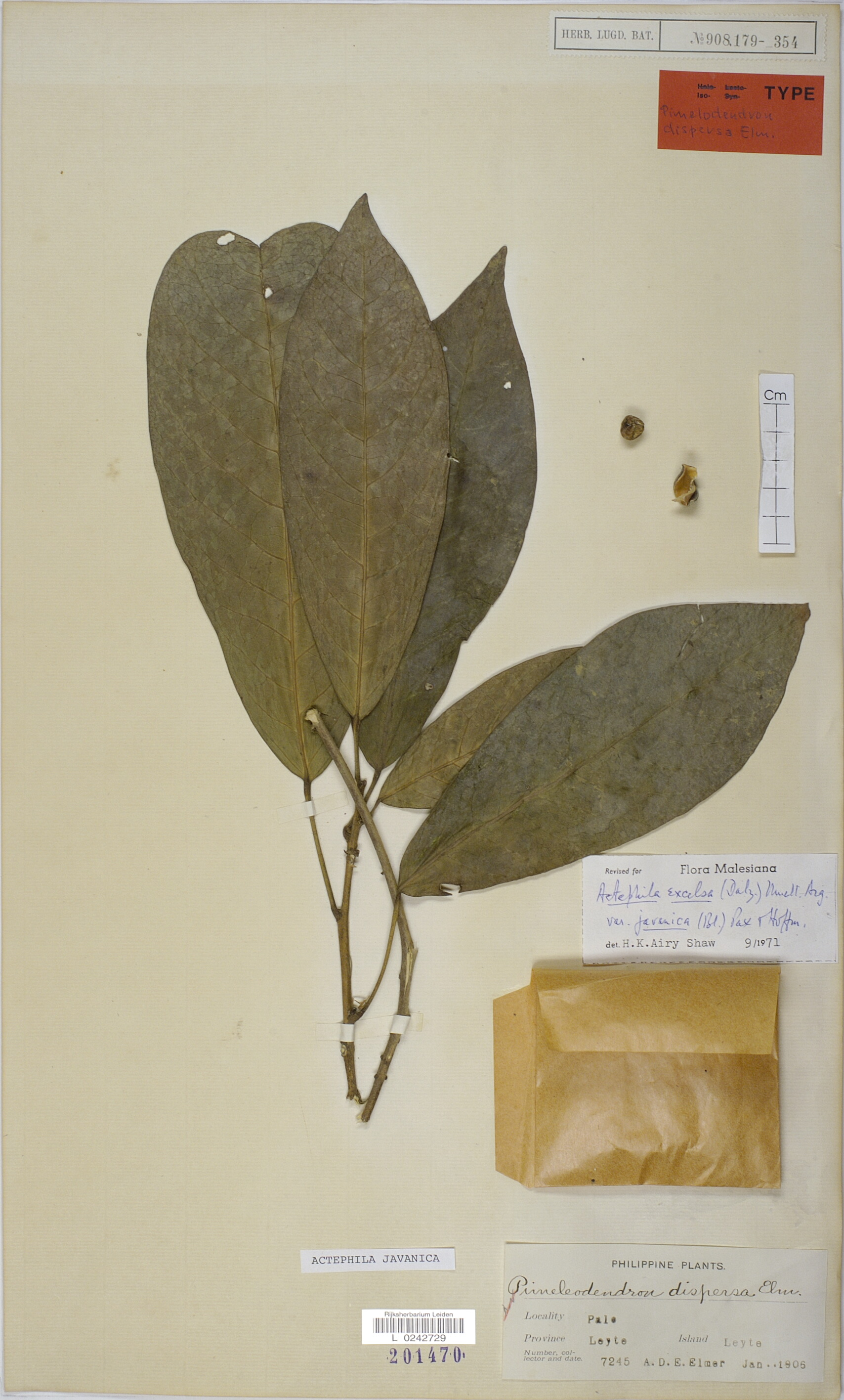
- Herbarium specimen of Actephila excelsa v. javanica

Scientific classification
- Kingdom: Plantae
- Clade: Tracheophytes
- Clade: Angiosperms
- Clade: Eudicots
- Clade: Rosids
- Order: Malpighiales
- Family: Phyllanthaceae
- Subfamily: Phyllanthoideae
- Tribe: Poranthereae
- Genus: Actephila; Blume

Synonyms
- Lithoxylon Endl.; Anomospermum Dalzell

= Actephila =

Genus of flowering plants

Actephila is a genus of about 36 species of flowering plants in the family Phyllanthaceae native to Southeast Asia, China, the Himalayas, Papuasia and Australia. Plants in the genus Actephila are monoecious trees or shrubs with entire leaves that are usually arranged alternately along the branches, flowers arranged singly or in clusters in leaf axils usually with 5 sepals and petals.

== Description ==
Plants in the genus Actephila are monoecious, evergreen trees, shrubs or subshrubs. Their leaves are simple and usually entire, with pinnate veins. The flowers are arranged singly or in clusters in leaf axils with separate male and female flowers, or sometimes male and female flowers on separate plants. The flowers have 4 to 6 overlapping sepals and usually 2 to 6 petals, male flowers with 3 to 6 stamens, and female flowers with a 3 locular ovary. The fruit is a lobed capsule.

== Taxonomy ==
The genus Actephila was first formally described in 1826 by Carl Ludwig Blume in his Bijdragen tot de Flora van Nederlandsch Indie. The name of the genus is derived from two Greek words, akte, "the seashore", and philos, "loving", referring to a coastal habitat.

=== Species list ===
The following is a list of Actephila species accepted by Plants of the World Online as at July 2024:

- Actephila alanbakeri Welzen & Ent
- Actephila albidula Gagnep.
- Actephila anthelminthica Gagnep.
- Actephila bella P.I.Forst.
- Actephila championiae P.I.Forst.
- Actephila collinsiae W.Hunter ex Craib
- Actephila daii Yhin
- Actephila discoides Heijkoop & Welzen
- Actephila dolichopoda Airy Shaw
- Actephila emarginata Heijkoop & Welzen
- Actephila excelsa (Dalzell) Müll.Arg.
- Actephila flavescens P.I.Forst.
- Actephila foetida Domin
- Actephila forsteri B.J.Conn
- Actephila grandifolia (Müll.Arg.) Baill.
- Actephila latifolia Benth.
- Actephila lindleyi (Steud.) Airy Shaw
- Actephila longipedicellata (Merr.) Croizat
- Actephila macrantha Gagnep.
- Actephila merrilliana Chun
- Actephila mooreana Baill.
- Actephila nitidula Gagnep.
- Actephila ovalis (Ridl.) Gage
- Actephila petiolaris Benth.
- Actephila pierrei Gagnep.
- Actephila platysepala Gagnep.
- Actephila plicata P.I.Forst.
- Actephila puberula Kurz
- Actephila saccata Welzen & Heijkoop
- Actephila sessilifolia Benth.
- Actephila stipularis Welzen & Heijkoop
- Actephila subsessilis Gagnep.
- Actephila traceyi P.I.Forst.
- Actephila trichogyna Airy Shaw
- Actephila venusta P.I.Forst.
- Actephila vernicosa P.I.Forst.
