= Gustav Heynhold =

German botanist

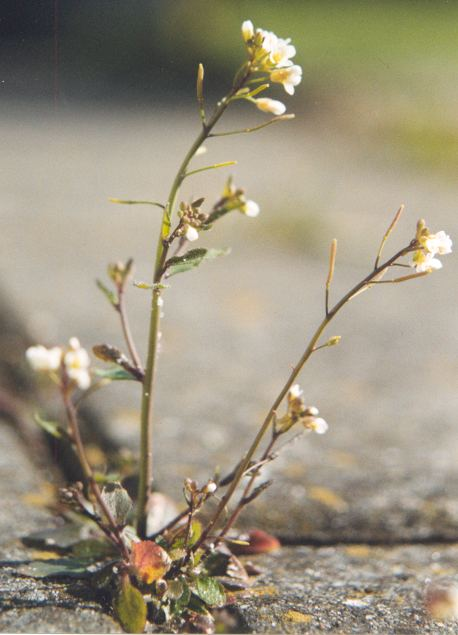
Arabidopsis thaliana

Gustav Heynhold (or Gustav Heinhold; 1800–1860) was a German botanist who worked at the botanic gardens of Dresden and Frankfurt.

In 1828 he was in Trieste where he carried out mapping and published "Uebersicht der Vegetation in den Umgebungen Triest's; von Hrn. Gustav Heynhold zu Dresden." His best-known work was the Nomenclator Botanicus Hortensis, an index of the botanical names of garden plants. It is not certain whether he had an academic degree or title. In 1846 the "Botanischen Centralblatt für Deutschland" listed him as a private scholar in Dresden. In total he was responsible for naming some 426 plant species.

In 1841, he renamed Arabis thaliana as Arabidopsis thaliana (L.) Heynh. Arabidopsis was the first plant to have its genome sequenced, and is frequently used as a model for understanding the molecular biology of many plant traits, including flower development and light sensing.

== Works ==
- Das natürliche Pflanzensystem : ein Versuch, die gegenseitigen Verwandtschaften der Pflanzen aufzufinden ... : mit Berücksichtigung der arzneilichen und überhaupt anwendbaren Gewächse, nebst einer historischen Einleitung, Publisher : Dresden; Leipzig : in der Arnoldischen Buchhandlung, 1840.
- Nomenclator Botanicus Hortensis in 2 parts
- Flora von Sachsen ...wildwachsenden und allgemein angebauten Pflanzen Dresden; Verlag: J. Naumann 1842
- Flora oder Botanische Zeitung. Nro. 42. Regensburg, 1829 - Uebersicht der Vegetation in den Umgebungen Triest's; von Hrn. Gustav Heynhold zu Dresden.
- Flora von Sachsen : Clavis generum : eine synoptische Darstellung der zu diesem Florengebiet gehörigen Gattungen der ersten Abtheilung (der Phanerogamen), zum erleichterten Bestimmen, nebst einem deutschen Register derselben
- Die Rhodoraceae oder Rhododendreae : eine Anleitung zur Cultur dieser Pflanzenfamilie, Traugott Jakob Seidel (1833- 1896) und Gustav Haynhold, Arnoldische Buchhandlung; erste Auflage 1843; zweite Auflage 1846
- Kryptogamie, Heinrich David August Ficinus; Gustav Heynhold; C Schubert - Arnoldsche Buchh. 1823
