= Pimelodendron =

Scientific classification
- Kingdom: Plantae
- Clade: Embryophytes
- Clade: Tracheophytes
- Clade: Spermatophytes
- Clade: Angiosperms
- Clade: Eudicots
- Clade: Rosids
- Order: Malpighiales
- Family: Euphorbiaceae
- Subfamily: Euphorbioideae
- Tribe: Stomatocalyceae
- Subtribe: Stomatocalycinae
- Genus: Pimelodendron; Hassk.

Synonyms
- Stomatocalyx Müll.Arg.

Genus of flowering plants

Pimelodendron is a plant genus in the family Euphorbiaceae first described as a genus in 1855. It is native to insular Southeast Asia, Thailand, Papuasia, and Queensland.

These are small and large trees, with red to brown bark. The tree has white or yellow, spotty exudate and also contains some latex. The leaves are in general tightly bunched at the end of twigs.

Species

1. Pimelodendron amboinicum Hassk. - Lesser Sunda Is, Sulawesi, Maluku, New Guinea, Bismarks, Solomons, Queensland
2. Pimelodendron griffithianum (Müll.Arg.) Benth. ex Hook.f. - S Thailand, W Malaysia, Borneo, Sumatra
3. Pimelodendron macrocarpum J.J.Sm. - W Malaysia, Borneo, Sumatra
4. Pimelodendron zoanthogyne J.J.Sm. - W Malaysia, Borneo, Sumatra

Formerly included

moved to Actephila

- Pimelodendron dispersum - Actephila excelsa var. javanica
