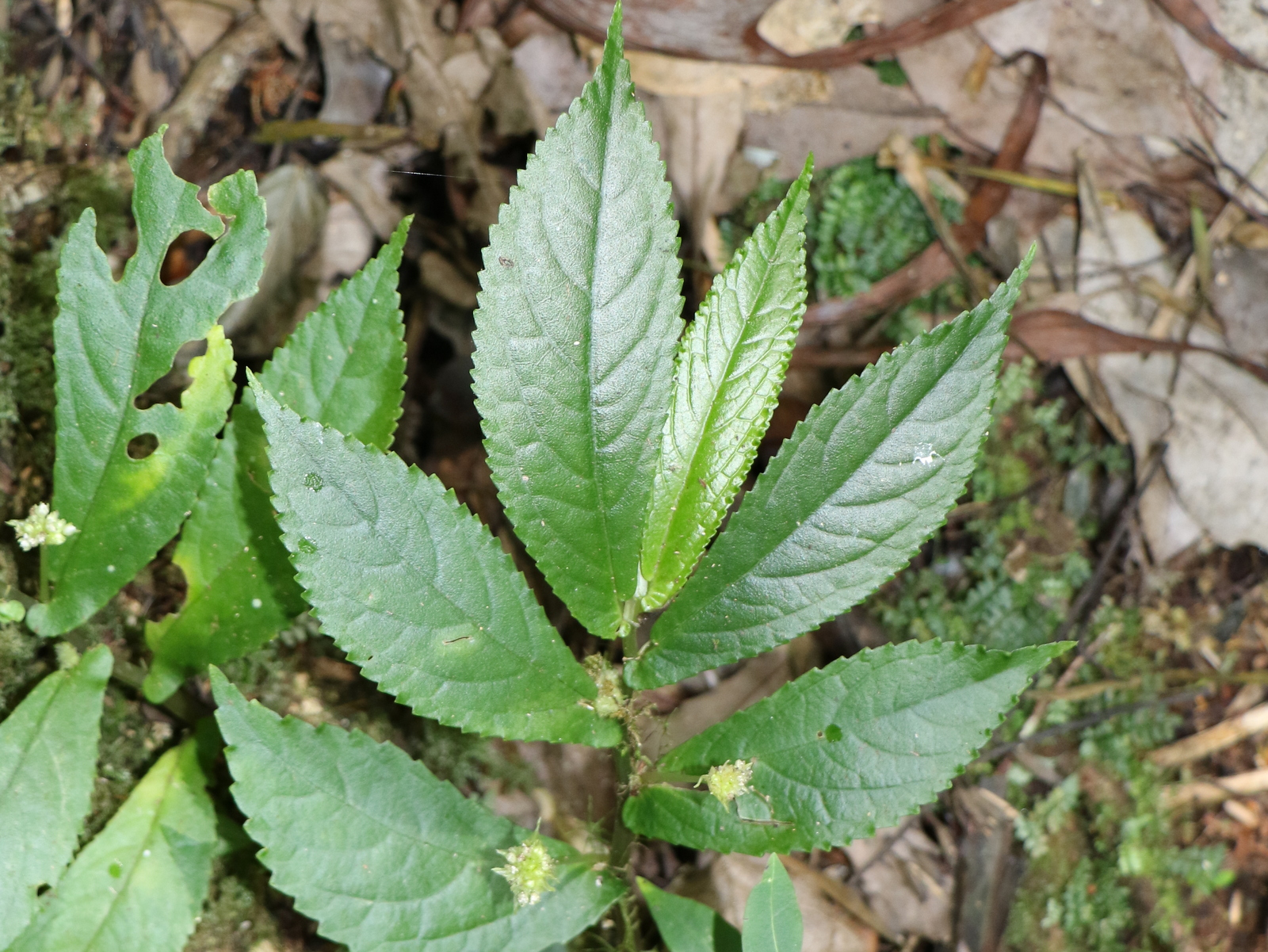
- Border Ranges National Park

Scientific classification
- Kingdom: Plantae
- Clade: Tracheophytes
- Clade: Angiosperms
- Clade: Eudicots
- Clade: Rosids
- Order: Rosales
- Family: Urticaceae
- Genus: Elatostema
- Species: E. stipitatum

Binomial name
- Elatostema stipitatum Wedd.

= Elatostema stipitatum =

Species of flowering plant

Elatostema stipitatum is a flowering plant in the nettle family. Often seen along rainforest streams or moist areas in eastern Australia, north from the Comboyne area of New South Wales to the Sunshine Coast area of Queensland. Leaves 1 to 6 cm long, 1 to 2.5 cm wide with a point, the base of the leaf may be asymmetric, leaves hairy with a toothed edge, the leaf stem may be absent, or 2 mm long. The plant can form mats and cover a large area.
