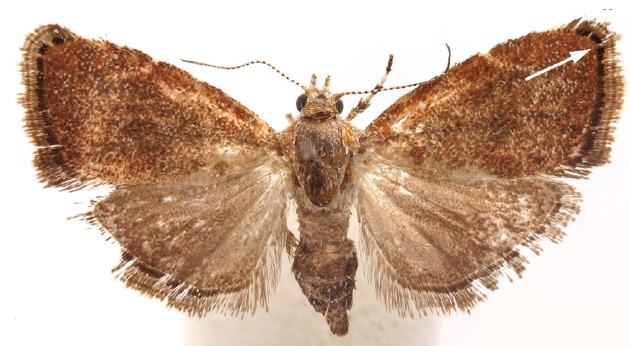

Scientific classification
- Domain: Eukaryota
- Kingdom: Animalia
- Phylum: Arthropoda
- Class: Insecta
- Order: Lepidoptera
- Family: Choreutidae
- Genus: Niveas
- Species: N. agassizi

Binomial name
- Niveas agassizi Rota, 2013

= Niveas agassizi =

Species of moth

Niveas agassizi is a moth of the family Choreutidae. It is found in Kenya.

The forewings are bronze-brown with speckled white-tipped scales over most of the surface. There is a distinct dark brown to black band along the termen with two small white spots at the apex. The hindwings are light brown.

== Etymology ==
The species is named in honour of David Agassiz, who collected all the known specimens and made many significant contributions to the knowledge of African micro-moths.
