= William Hunter (Asiatic Society) =

British botanist (1755–1812)

William Hunter (1755 in Montrose, Angus – 1812) was an official and minister in India, then secretary to the Asiatic Society in Calcutta, Bengal. He made one of the first Bible translations into Hindi.

He studied at the University of Aberdeen and went to India in 1781. He succeeded John Borthwick Gilchrist as the secretary of the Asiatic Society in 1804 and in 1805 was made the Secretary of the college.

== Publications ==
William Hunter; "Observations on Nauclea gambin, : the plant producing the drug called gutta gambeer with characters of two other species" communicated by the president; read June 16, 1807. in: Transactions of the Linnean society Vol. 9 (1808), p. 218-224 (reprinted here)
