= Nomenclator Botanicus Hortensis =

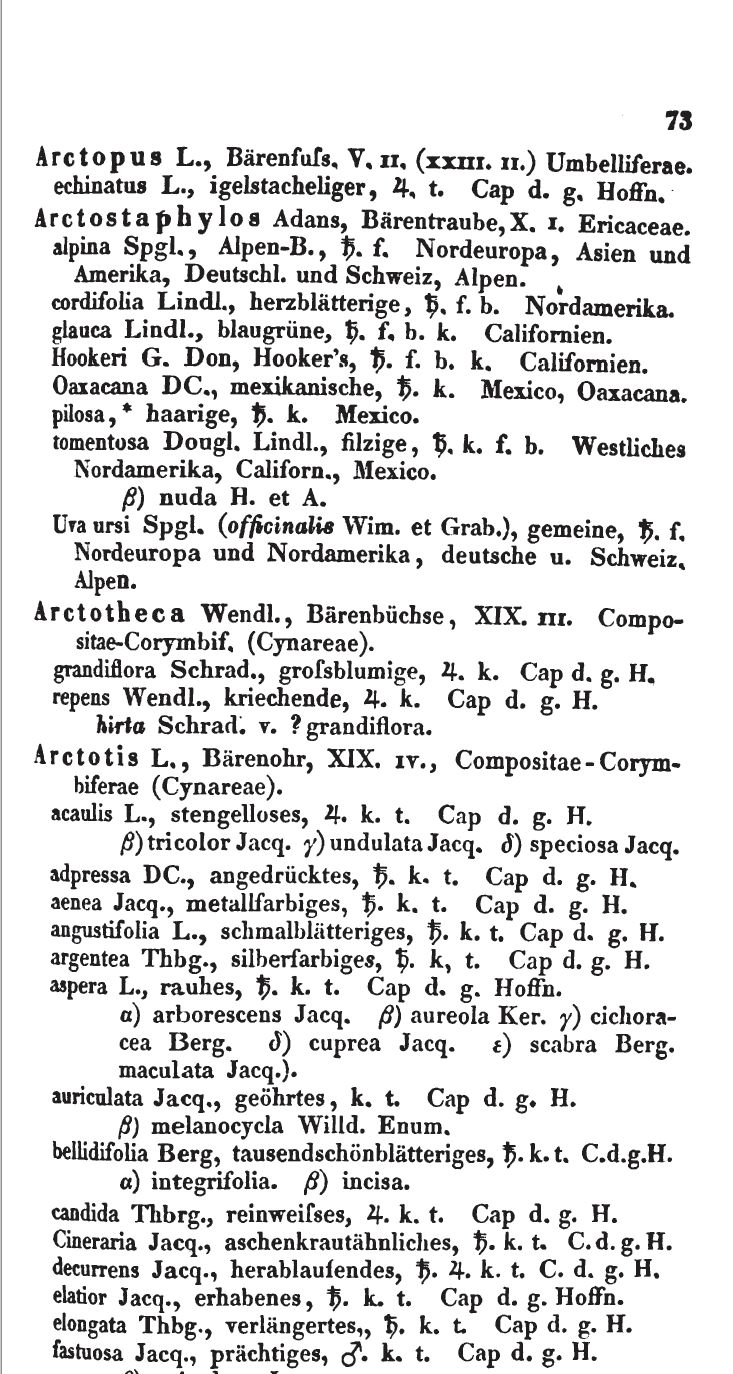
Page from Nomenclator Botanicus Hortensis

Nomenclator Botanicus Hortensis a.k.a. Nomencl. Bot. Hort. is an 1840-46 alphabetic index of cultivated plants from the gardens of Europe by the German botanist Gustav Heynhold. It includes synonyms, botanical authors, countries of origin and cultivation. It was published in Dresden and Leipzig by the firm Arnoldischen Buchhandlung with an introduction by Ludwig Reichenbach.

'Nomenclator' is one who bestows names or draws up a classified system of names, and by extension the term has become used for a book setting out such a system. The word 'nomenclature' is derived from 'nomenclator'. Well-known nomenclators have been the 1821 Nomenclator Botanicus of Ernst Gottlieb von Steudel, the 1826 Hortus Britannicus of Robert Sweet and John Claudius Loudon's 1830 Hortus Britannicus. Sweet's Hortus Britannicus is described as a 'Catalogue of Plants cultivated in the Gardens of Great Britain' and 'Arranged in Natural Orders with the addition of the Linnean Classes and Orders to which they belong, Reference to the Books where they are described, their Native Places of Growth, when introduced, Time of Flowering, Duration, and Reference to Figures with numerous synonyms'.
