= Campnosperma brevipetiolatum =

Conservation status
- Least Concern (IUCN 3.1)

Scientific classification
- Kingdom: Plantae
- Clade: Embryophytes
- Clade: Tracheophytes
- Clade: Angiosperms
- Clade: Eudicots
- Clade: Rosids
- Order: Sapindales
- Family: Anacardiaceae
- Genus: Campnosperma
- Species: C. brevipetiolatum

Binomial name
- Campnosperma brevipetiolatum Volkens

Synonyms
- Campnosperma brassii Merr. & L.M.Perry

Species of tree

Campnosperma brevipetiolatum is a species of tree in the Anacardiaceae family. It is native to an area in the west Pacific and Malesia from the Santa Cruz Islands to the Caroline Islands and Sulawesi. It is commonly used for its timber, including for canoe making, but also for oil-production and medicine. It has been used as an indicator species to identify 19th century sites of indigenous occupation in the Solomon Islands.

== Taxonomy ==
This species was named by the German botanist Georg Volkens, who carried out research in the Caroline and Mariana Islands and at the then Buitenzorg Botanical Gardens in Jawa. He described the species in 1901 in the article 'Die Vegetation der Karolinen, mit besonderer Berücksichtigung der von Yap' in the periodical Botanische Jahrbücher für Systematik, Pflanzengeschichte und Pflanzengeographie (Leipzig).

== Description ==
The tree grows up to 50 m tall. The trunk can be up to 100 cm diameter at breast height. The trunk is often tapered, with a roughly flat crown supported by large upward limbs. The fruit is magenta coloured and about 5mm in diameter. In the Solomon Islands it is sometimes found growing in pure stands.

== Distribution ==
The species is native to an area in the west Pacific and eastern Malesia, from the Santa Cruz Islands to the Caroline Islands and Sulawesi. Countries and regions in which the taxa occurs are: Solomon Islands (including Santa Cruz Islands); Federated States of Micronesia (Caroline Islands); Palau); Papua Niugini (PNG, including Bougainville, Bismarck Archipelago, eastern New Guinea); Indonesia (West Papua, Maluku Islands, Sulawesi).

== Habitat and ecology ==
The plant usually grows in lowland forests, up to 500 meters elevation. It is at times dominant or co-dominant, and can successfully regenerate in cleared or logged lands.

In the vicinity of the Hindenberg Wall, PNG, the tree is found growing at some 1495-770 meters elevation, in a forest with characterised by the following arboreal species: Syzygium species, Buchanania macrocarpa, C. brevipetiolatum, Opucunonia nymannii, Pimelodendron amboinicum, Planchonella and Calophyllum species with scattered Pandanus.

In the Mappi Regency in West Papua, the species grows abundantly in swamp forest and to a lesser extent in secondary dryland forest. It occurs as solitary trees, as opposed to clumps/clusters of the same taxa.

== Conservation ==
While the species has a wide distribution, large population and there are no current and future major threats, there is pressure from logging and deforestation and this results in a precautionary rating of Least Concern.

== Vernacular names ==
- gwart, East Sepik Province, PNG
- terentang, Malay/Indonesian

== Uses ==
The taxa is predominantly used for timber, with logging occurring for local and national purposes. The timber is used in construction, and furniture and musical instrument making. Plywood, veneers and novelties have also been produced. Locally, canoe making and oil extraction occurs from the tree. Diumi-oil and tigaso-oil are used for veterinary and medicinal uses. The tree is used for reforestation in the Solomon Islands, readily growing.

The Yachai people of the Mappi Regency, West Papua, use the tree for canoe-making, but the supply has been much reduced by logging.

The tree has been used as an indicator of century-old disturbance on New Georgia, Solomons. 19th Century areas of settlement, swiddens and taro field terraces are marked by forest stands with the species, recognisable in aerial photography.

People living in Bangus and Mariawai villages, East Sepik Province, PNG use the raw sap of the plant administered topically to treat ulcers.
