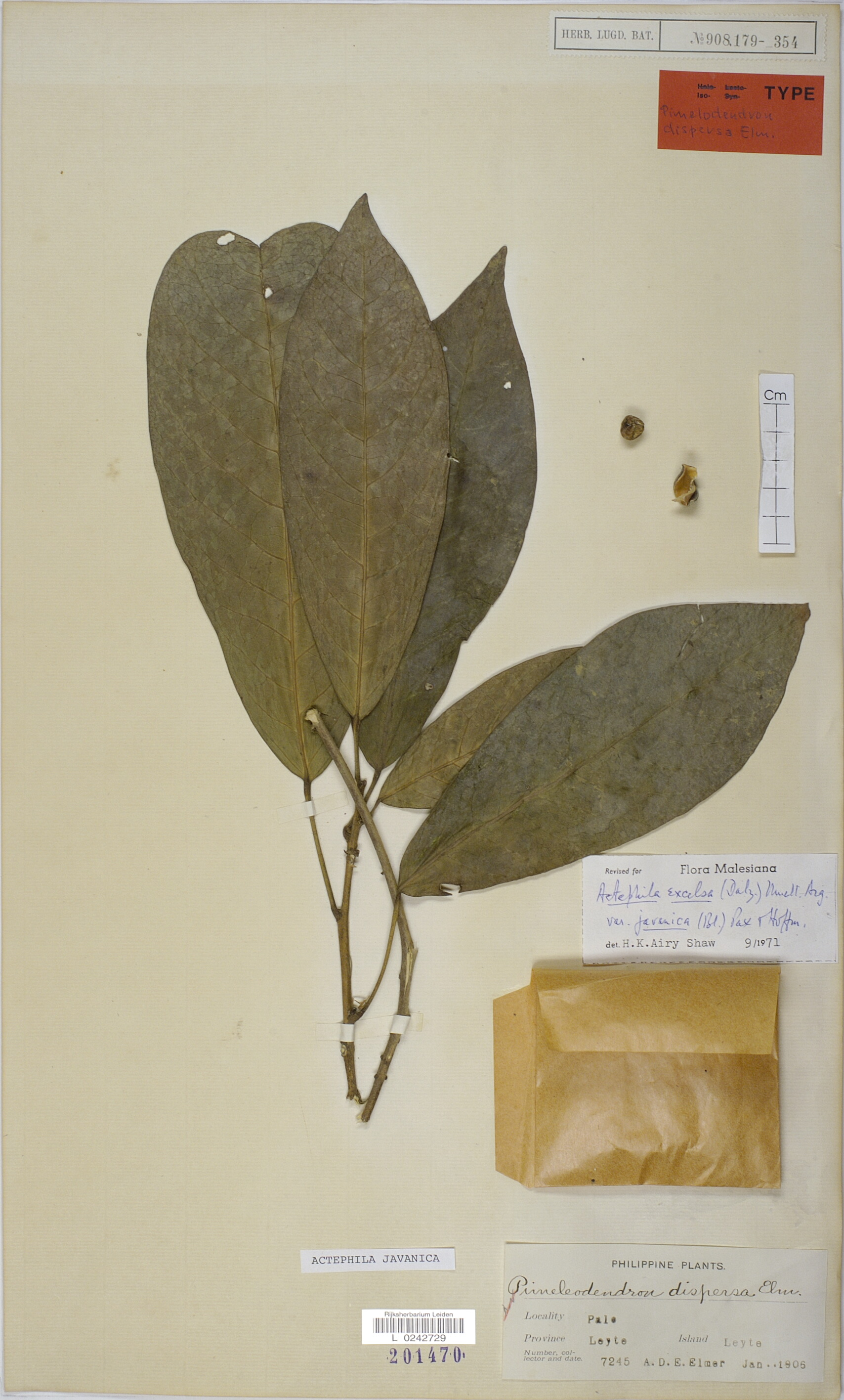
- Herbarium specimen of Actephila excelsa var. javanica

Scientific classification
- Kingdom: Plantae
- Clade: Embryophytes
- Clade: Tracheophytes
- Clade: Spermatophytes
- Clade: Angiosperms
- Clade: Eudicots
- Clade: Rosids
- Order: Malpighiales
- Family: Phyllanthaceae
- Genus: Actephila
- Species: A. excelsa

Binomial name
- Actephila excelsa (Dalzell) Müll.Arg.

Synonyms
- Actephila bantamensis Miq.; Actephila dispersa (Elmer) Merr.; Actephila dolichantha Croizat; Actephila excelsa var. brevifolia N.Balach., Mahesw. & Chakrab.; Actephila gigantifolia Koord.; Actephila gitingensis Elmer; Actephila javanica Miq.; Actephila magnifolia Elmer; Actephila major Müll.Arg.; Actephila minahassae Koord.; Actephila neilgherrensis Wight; Actephila thomsonii Müll.Arg.; Actephila zeylanica Müll.Arg.; Anomospermum excelsum Dalzell; Savia actephila Hassk.; Savia zeylanica Baill.

= Actephila excelsa =

Species of plant

Actephila excelsa is a species of shrub in the family Phyllanthaceae. It is native to an area in Tropical Asia and Zhōngguó/China, from Sulawesi to India and Guangxi. It is a highly variable species and leaf forms vary across adjacent ecozones. The plant is used in building houses and as a vegetable. Grey-shanked douc langurs eat the leaves.

== Description ==
It is noted that this is a highly variable species.

The taxa grows as a shrub or tree from 1 to 10 m (3.3 to 32.8 ft), rarely 15 m (49 ft), tall with a trunk that is up to 30 cm (12 in) in diameter. The outer bark is pale-tan to greyish, greenish-yellow and reddish in colour, and from smooth to possessing fine vertical fissures to scaly. Leaves are alternate, though subopposite at the end of branches, smooth to slightly to completely covered in hairs, with an elliptic (sometimes more or less obovate) blade some (4-)5.5–35.5 x (1.1–)1.9–13.5(–15.9) cm in size; an acute to obtuse base, flat margin, cuspidate apex (sometimes to acuminate or even rarely acute); light to dark-green glossy upper, paler-green lower which is sometimes hairy on midrib and veins. Solitary to bundled flowers, white to greenish-white. The fruit capsule is oblate, some 1.5 by 2-2.5 cm in diameter with a brown skin and yellowish-white inside. Three-angled seeds about 10 by 0.9 cm in size. Distinguishing features of this species of Actephila include 5-95 mm long petioles; elliptic (to more or less obovate) leaf blades; dimensions of leaf blades (see above); white to greenish pistillate flowers; knobbly-surfaced fruit-wall with venation not raised; 5-8 mm long columella which are somewhat thickened basally but do not completely cover disc and base of sepals. In most of its habitat it will flower and fruit the whole year round.

Flowering in Zhōngguó/China occurs from February to September, fruit from July to October. Distinguishing characteristics for this species of Actephila in Zhōngguó/China include the long acuminate leaf blade which is puberulent abaxially (hairs on lower); the female sepals are about 2mm long and the female petals about 1.5 mm long,

== Distribution ==
The taxa is native to an area in Tropical Asia and Zhōngguó/China. Countries and regions in which it occurs are: Indonesia (Sulawesi, Kalimantan, Jawa, Sumatera); Philippines; Malaysia (Sabah, Sarawak, Peninsular Malaysia); Thailand; Vietnam; Zhōngguó/China (Yunnan, Guangxi); Myanmar; India (including Nicobar Islands, Andaman Islands, Assam; Bangladesh; East Himalaya; Sri Lanka.

== Habitat & ecology ==
The shrub/tree grows in a range of habitats from primary mixed lowland dipterocarp rainforest to evergreen-, deciduous-, secondary-, hill-, kerangas-forests, as well as in gallery situations such as along rocky seashores, rivers and roads. It grows on limestone, loam, sandy, ultrabasic, sandy-clay, granite-derived and basalt soils. The altitudinal range is usually from sealeave up to 500 m (1,600 ft), though sometimes found up to 1,350 m (4,430 ft).

The taxa grows in Zhōngguó/China on sparsely forested slopes and in thickets on limestone bedrock, at altitudes from 100 to 1,500 m (330 to 4,920 ft).

In the hills of Tirunelveli district, Tamil Nadu, India, part of the southern Western Ghats, the plant grows in partial shade in the deciduous to semi-evergreen forest, full shade in the evergreen forest and in partial shade of the highly wind-blown montane forest. The species exhibits anatomical differences in its leaves in these different ecologies.

The langurs, Pygathrix cinerea (grey-shanked douc langur), in Kon Ka Kinh National Park, central Vietnam, eat the leaves of the shrub/tree.

The symbiotic fungus Meliola actephilae grows on the leaves of the species in Wayanad district, Kerala, south India.

It is a food plant for the moth Chloroclystis actephilae.

== Vernacular Names ==
- lambonan (Filipino language)
- manikusan (Philippines)
- baner etem, pehailgei, toetoeg getah (Sumatra)
- kelapa tupai (Malay Peninsula)
- 毛喜光花, mao xi guang hua (Standard Chinese)
- kamtar-oying (Adi people, Siang district, Arunachal Pradesh, northeast India)

== Uses ==
The Shompen people of Great Nicobar Island, use the stems and branches in house construction, specifically as posts, roof beams, thatching rods and as wall-sticks.

Adi people living in the Arunachal Pradesh, India, harvest the tender shoots of the plant to eat as a vegetable.

The plant is recorded as being used as a stimulant.

== History ==
The species was named in 1863 by the Swiss botanist Johann Müller (1828–1896), who used the name Johannes Müller Argoviensis when publishing (his name is relatively common). He published the description in the journal Linnaea; Ein Journal für die Botanik in ihrem ganzen Umfange (Berlin). Müller focused on lichens, but described thousands of plants. In his naming of A. excelsa, he superseded the taxa name Anomospermum excelsum than had been put forward by the Scots botanish Nicol Alexander Dalzell (1817–1877), who described that taxa in 1851. Dalzell had worked in India, and was notable for connecting decreasing rainfall with deforestation.
