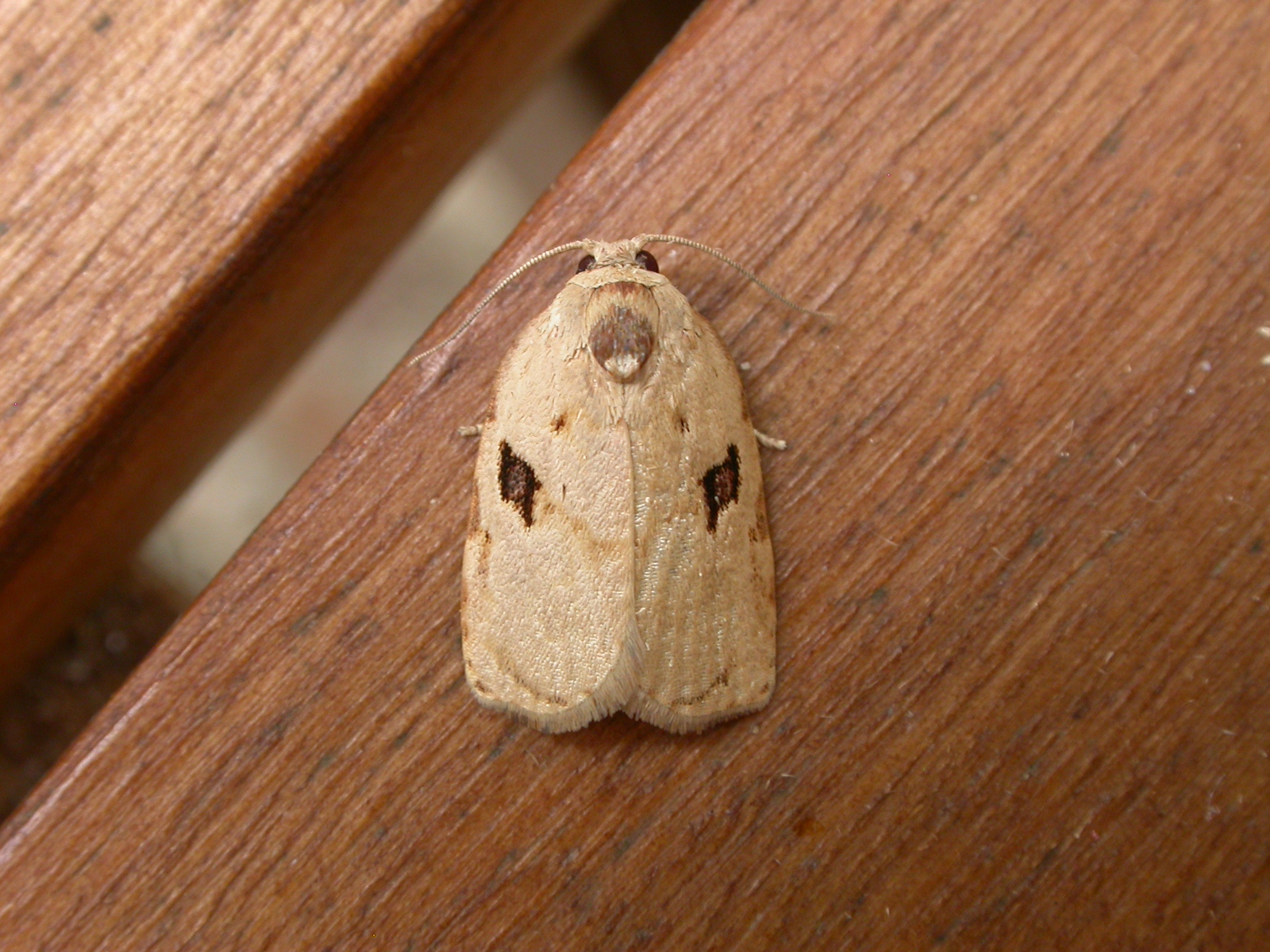

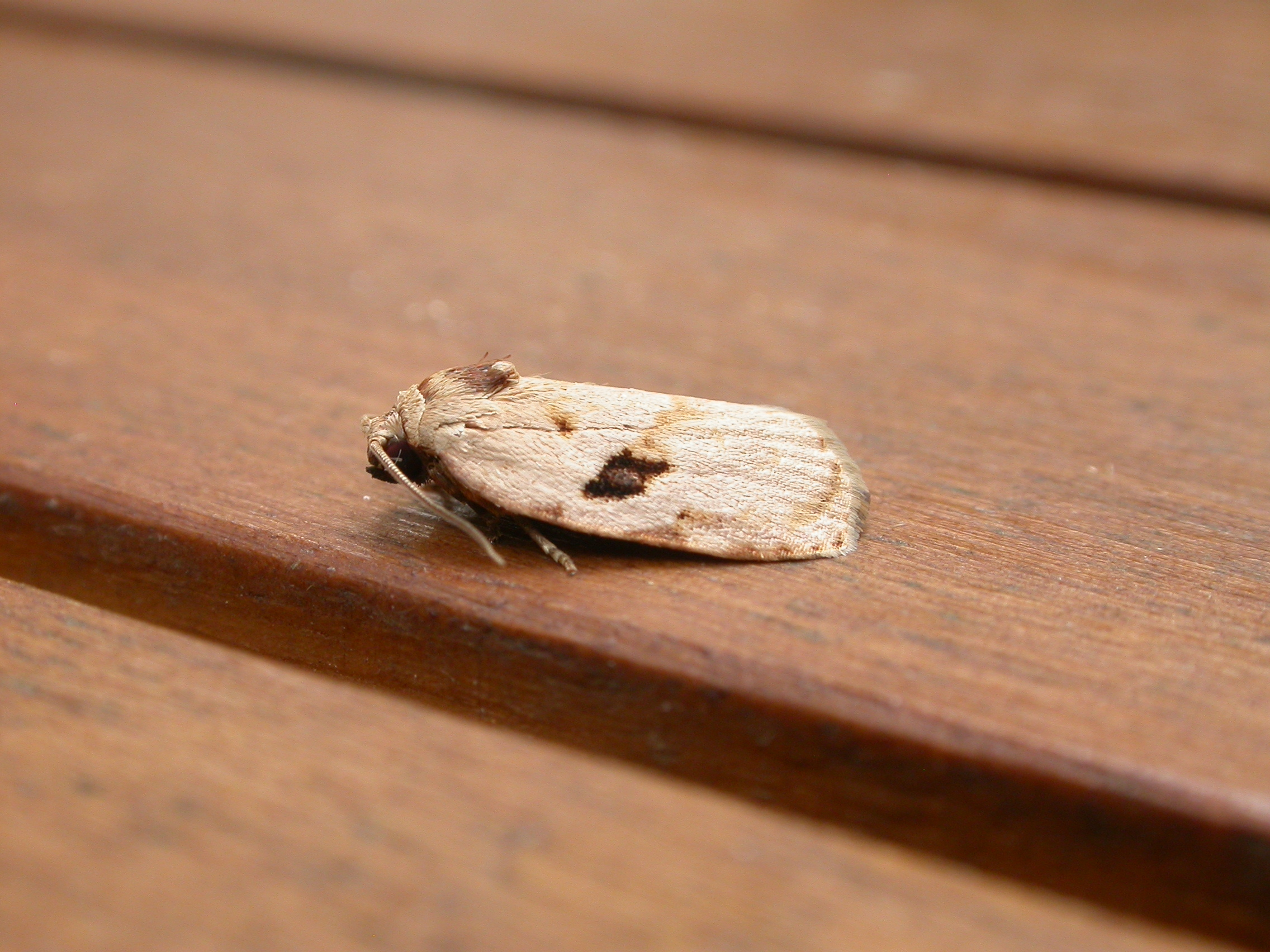

Scientific classification
- Kingdom: Animalia
- Phylum: Arthropoda
- Class: Insecta
- Order: Lepidoptera
- Family: Tortricidae
- Genus: Homona
- Species: H. mermerodes

Binomial name
- Homona mermerodes Meyrick, 1910

Synonyms
- Capua myopolia Turner, 1945; Anathamna psathyra Turner, 1946

= Homona mermerodes =

Species of moth

Homona mermerodes is a species of moth of the family Tortricidae first described by Edward Meyrick in 1910. It was described from the Solomon Islands, but is also found in Australia (Queensland), New Guinea and Seram. The habitat consists of bamboo, secondary forests and alluvial forests.

The larvae are highly polyphagous. When full grown, they reach a length of about 15 mm.
