= Homalium foetidum =

Conservation status
- Least Concern (IUCN 3.1)

Scientific classification
- Kingdom: Plantae
- Clade: Tracheophytes
- Clade: Angiosperms
- Clade: Eudicots
- Clade: Rosids
- Order: Malpighiales
- Family: Salicaceae
- Genus: Homalium
- Species: H. foetidum

Binomial name
- Homalium foetidum (Roxb.) Benth.

Species of flowering plant

Homalium foetidum is a species of plant in the family Salicaceae. It is found in Indonesia, Malaysia, Papua New Guinea, and the Philippines.
