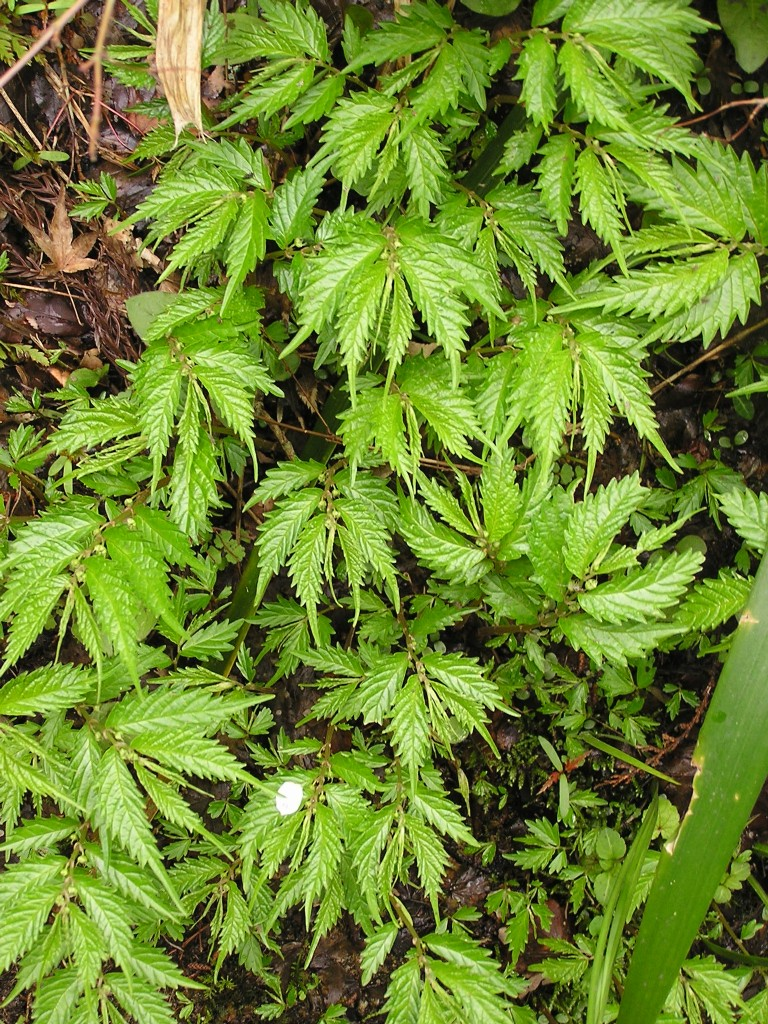
- Elatostema involucratum

Scientific classification
- Kingdom: Plantae
- Clade: Tracheophytes
- Clade: Angiosperms
- Clade: Eudicots
- Clade: Rosids
- Order: Rosales
- Family: Urticaceae
- Tribe: Elatostemateae
- Genus: Elatostema; J.R.Forst. & G.Forst.

Species
- See text

= Elatostema =

Genus of flowering plants

Elatostema is a genus of flowering plants containing approximately 350 known species in the nettle family Urticaceae, native to tropical forest clearings throughout Australasia, Asia and Africa. There may be as many as 1,000 species of this little-known genus, which is susceptible to deforestation and other forms of human exploitation. Some species, for instance the recently discovered E. fengshanense, show unusual adaptations to growing in deep shade in caves. DNA analysis suggests that the three genera Elastostema, Pellionia, and Pilea be grouped together as one.

Elatostema repens and E. pulchra are cultivated as houseplants in temperate regions. E. repens and E. repens var. pulchrum have gained the Royal Horticultural Society's Award of Garden Merit.

== Selected species ==
- Elatostema backeri
- Elatostema fengshanense
- Elatostema grande (Wedd.) P.S.Green – Lord Howe Island
- Elatostema lineolatum
- Elatostema malipoense
- Elatostema montanum Endl. – Norfolk Island
- Elatostema pleiophlebium
- Elatostema pulchra
- Elatostema repens
- Elatostema reticulatum Wedd. – Qld, NSW, Australia
- Elatostema rugosum
- Elatostema stipitatum Wedd. – Qld, NSW, Australia
- Elatostema umbellatum
