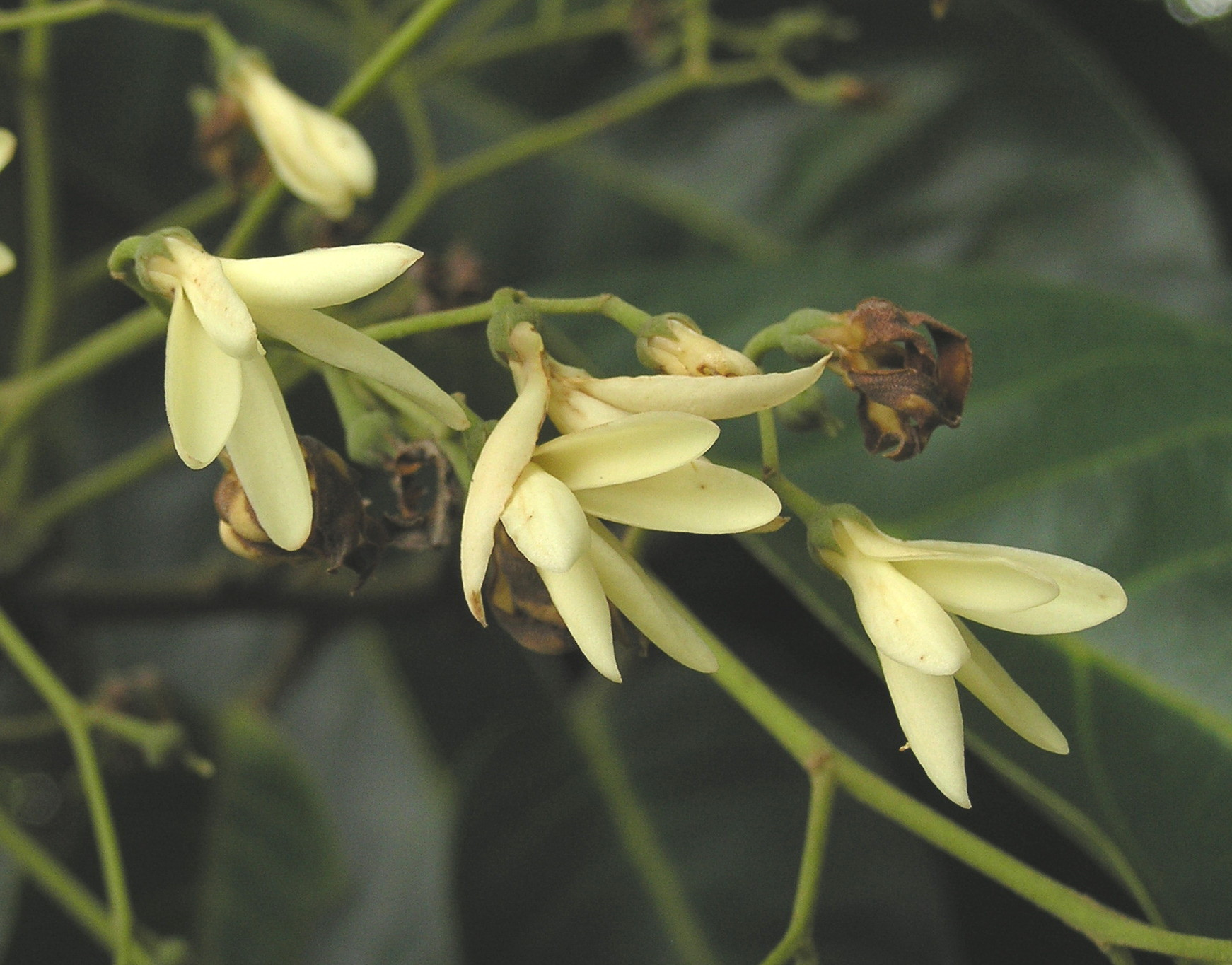
- At Singapore Botanic Gardens

Conservation status
- Least Concern (IUCN 3.1)

Scientific classification
- Kingdom: Plantae
- Clade: Embryophytes
- Clade: Tracheophytes
- Clade: Spermatophytes
- Clade: Angiosperms
- Clade: Eudicots
- Clade: Rosids
- Order: Malvales
- Family: Dipterocarpaceae
- Genus: Vatica
- Species: V. rassak

Binomial name
- Vatica rassak (Korth.) Blume

Synonyms
- Retinodendron moluccanum (Burck) F.Heim; Retinodendron rassak Korth.; Vateria papuana (Dyer) Dyer ex Hemsl.; Vateria rassak (Korth.) Walp.; Vatica celebensis Brandis; Vatica celebica Slooten; Vatica moluccana Burck; Vatica papuana Dyer; Vatica papuana K.Schum.; Vatica schumanniana Gilg; Vatica subcordata Hallier f.

= Vatica rassak =

Species of tree

Vatica rassak is a tree in the family Dipterocarpaceae, native to Maritime Southeast Asia. The specific epithet rassak is from resak, the species' Malay common name.

== Description ==
Vatica rassak grows up to 30 metres (100 ft) tall, with a trunk diameter of up to 70 cm (28 in). Its coriaceous leaves are elliptic to oblong and measure up to 32 cm (13 in) long. The inflorescences bear cream flowers. In Borneo, a newly discovered, unnamed special caterpillar makes use of the poisonous resin from this tree to build a cocoon.

== Distribution and habitat ==
Vatica rassak is native to Borneo, the Maluku Islands, Sulawesi, New Guinea and the Philippines. Its habitat is along rivers and in lowland dipterocarp forest, at elevations to 400 m (1,300 ft).
