= Ficus wassa =

Conservation status
- Least Concern (IUCN 3.1)

Scientific classification
- Kingdom: Plantae
- Clade: Tracheophytes
- Clade: Angiosperms
- Clade: Eudicots
- Clade: Rosids
- Order: Rosales
- Family: Moraceae
- Genus: Ficus
- Subgenus: F. subg. Sycidium
- Species: F. wassa

Binomial name
- Ficus wassa Roxb.

Synonyms
- Ficus ampelos var. obversifolia Miq.; Ficus anggica Diels; Ficus aruensis King; Ficus carolii Diels; Ficus duriuscula King; Ficus eulampra K.Schum. & Lauterb.; Ficus laciniata Roxb.; Ficus lamprophylla K.Schum. & Lauterb.; Ficus nubigena Diels; Ficus portus-finschii Warb.; Ficus reticulatissima S.Moore; Ficus rhodocarpa Summerh.; Ficus teregam Pennant, nom. rej. prop.; Ficus wassa var. nubigena (Diels) Corner; Ficus wassa var. obversifolia (Miq.) Corner

Species of fig

Ficus wassa is a species of fig in the family Moraceae. It is a shrub or tree native to the Lesser Sunda Islands, Maluku Islands, New Guinea, Bismarck Archipelago, Solomon Islands, and Vanuatu. It grows up to 15 metres tall in lowland and montane tropical moist forest from sea level to 3,000 metres elevation. It is often grown in villages.
