= List of Macaranga species =

Macaranga is a genus of plants in the family Euphorbiaceae. As of September 2025, Plants of the World Online accepted 308 species.

== A ==
- Macaranga acerifolia Airy Shaw
- Macaranga advena Pax & K.Hoffm.
- Macaranga aenigmatica Whitmore
- Macaranga aetheadenia Airy Shaw
- Macaranga albescens L.M.Perry
- Macaranga alchorneifolia Baker
- Macaranga alchorneoides Pax & Lingelsh.
- Macaranga aleuritoides F.Muell.
- Macaranga allorobinsonii Whitmore
- Macaranga alnifolia Baker
- Macaranga amentifera Whitmore
- Macaranga amissa Airy Shaw
- Macaranga amplifolia Merr.
- Macaranga anceps Airy Shaw
- Macaranga andamanica Kurz
- Macaranga angolensis (Müll.Arg.) Müll.Arg.
- Macaranga angulata S.J.Davies
- Macaranga angustifolia K.Schum. & Lauterb.
- Macaranga ashtonii S.J.Davies
- Macaranga assas Amougou
- Macaranga astrolabica Pax & K.Hoffm.
- Macaranga attenuata J.W.Moore
- Macaranga auctoris Whitmore

== B ==
- Macaranga baccaureifolia Airy Shaw
- Macaranga bailloniana Müll.Arg.
- Macaranga balabacensis Pax & K.Hoffm.
- Macaranga bancana (Miq.) Müll.Arg.
- Macaranga barkeriana Whitmore
- Macaranga barteri Müll.Arg.
- Macaranga beccariana Merr.
- Macaranga beillei Prain
- Macaranga belensis L.M.Perry
- Macaranga bicolor Müll.Arg.
- Macaranga bifoveata J.J.Sm.
- Macaranga boutonioides Baill.
- Macaranga brachythyrsa Pax & K.Hoffm.
- Macaranga brachytricha Airy Shaw
- Macaranga brevipetiolata Airy Shaw
- Macaranga brooksii Ridl.
- Macaranga brunneofloccosa Pax & K.Hoffm.
- Macaranga bullata Pax & K.Hoffm.

== C ==
- Macaranga caesariata A.C.Sm.
- Macaranga caladiifolia Becc.
- Macaranga calcicola Airy Shaw
- Macaranga capensis (Baill.) Sim
- Macaranga carolinensis Volkens
- Macaranga carrii L.M.Perry
- Macaranga cassandrae Whitmore
- Macaranga caudata Pax & K.Hoffm.
- Macaranga caudatifolia Elmer
- Macaranga celebica Koord.
- Macaranga chlorolepis Airy Shaw
- Macaranga choiseuliana Airy Shaw
- Macaranga chrysotricha K.Schum. & Lauterb.
- Macaranga cissifolia (Zoll. & Rchb.f.) Müll.Arg.
- Macaranga clavata Warb.
- Macaranga clemensiae L.M.Perry
- Macaranga coggygria Airy Shaw
- Macaranga congestiflora Merr.
- Macaranga conglomerata Brenan
- Macaranga conifera (Rchb.f. & Zoll.) Müll.Arg.
- Macaranga constricta Whitmore & Airy Shaw
- Macaranga cordifolia (Roxb.) Müll.Arg.
- Macaranga coriacea (Baill.) Müll.Arg.
- Macaranga corymbosa (Müll.Arg.) Müll.Arg.
- Macaranga costulata Pax & K.Hoffm.
- Macaranga crassistipulosa Pax & K.Hoffm.
- Macaranga cucullata J.J.Sm.
- Macaranga cuernosensis Elmer
- Macaranga cumingii (Baill.) Müll.Arg.
- Macaranga cuneifolia (Rchb.f. & Zoll.) Müll.Arg.
- Macaranga cupularis Müll.Arg.
- Macaranga cuspidata Boivin ex Baill.

== D ==
- Macaranga dallachyana (Baill.) Airy Shaw
- Macaranga darbyshirei Airy Shaw
- Macaranga daviesii W.N.Takeuchi
- Macaranga decaryana Leandri
- Macaranga decipiens L.M.Perry
- Macaranga densiflora Warb.
- Macaranga denticulata (Blume) Müll.Arg.
- Macaranga depressa (Müll.Arg.) Müll.Arg.
- Macaranga dibeleensis De Wild.
- Macaranga didymocarpa Whitmore
- Macaranga diepenhorstii (Miq.) Müll.Arg.
- Macaranga digyna (Wight) Müll.Arg.
- Macaranga dioica (G.Forst.) Müll.Arg.
- Macaranga domatiosa Airy Shaw
- Macaranga ducis Whitmore

== E ==
- Macaranga ebolowana Pax & K.Hoffm.
- Macaranga echinocarpa Baker
- Macaranga eloba Pax & K.Hoffm.
- Macaranga endertii Whitmore
- Macaranga esseriana W.N.Takeuchi
- Macaranga eymae L.M.Perry

== F ==
- Macaranga faiketo Whitmore
- Macaranga fallacina Pax & K.Hoffm.
- Macaranga ferruginea Baker
- Macaranga fragrans L.M.Perry
- Macaranga fulva Airy Shaw

== G ==
- Macaranga gabunica Prain
- Macaranga galorei Whitmore
- Macaranga gamblei Hook.f.
- Macaranga gigantea (Rchb.f. & Zoll.) Müll.Arg.
- Macaranga gigantifolia Merr.
- Macaranga glaberrima (Hassk.) Airy Shaw
- Macaranga glabra (Juss.) Pax & K.Hoffm.
- Macaranga glandibracteolata S.J.Davies
- Macaranga glandulifera L.M.Perry
- Macaranga gracilis Pax & K.Hoffm.
- Macaranga graeffeana Pax & K.Hoffm.
- Macaranga grallata McPherson
- Macaranga grandifolia (Blanco) Merr.
- Macaranga grayana Müll.Arg.
- Macaranga griffithiana Müll.Arg.

== H ==
- Macaranga hageniana Gilli
- Macaranga hartleyana Whitmore
- Macaranga harveyana (Müll.Arg.) Müll.Arg.
- Macaranga havilandii Airy Shaw
- Macaranga hengkyana Whitmore
- Macaranga henryi (Pax & K.Hoffm.) Rehder
- Macaranga herculis Whitmore
- Macaranga heterophylla (Müll.Arg.) Müll.Arg.
- Macaranga heudelotii Baill.
- Macaranga hexandra (Roxb.) Müll.Arg.
- Macaranga heynei I.M.Johnst.
- Macaranga hispida (Blume) Müll.Arg.
- Macaranga hoffmannii L.M.Perry
- Macaranga hosei King ex Hook.f.
- Macaranga huahineensis J.Florence
- Macaranga hullettii King ex Hook.f.
- Macaranga humbertii Leandri
- Macaranga hurifolia Beille
- Macaranga hypoleuca (Rchb.f. & Zoll.) Müll.Arg.
- Macaranga hystrichogyne Airy Shaw

== I ==
- Macaranga inamoena F.Muell. ex Benth.
- Macaranga indica Wight
- Macaranga indistincta Whitmore
- Macaranga induta L.M.Perry
- Macaranga inermis Pax & K.Hoffm.
- Macaranga intonsa Whitmore
- Macaranga involucrata (Roxb.) Baill. ex Müll.Arg.

== J ==
- Macaranga javanica (Blume) Müll.Arg.
- Macaranga johannium Whitmore

== K ==
- Macaranga kanehirae Hosok.
- Macaranga kilimandscharica Pax
- Macaranga kinabaluensis Airy Shaw
- Macaranga kingii Hook.f.
- Macaranga klaineana Pierre ex Prain
- Macaranga kostermansii L.M.Perry
- Macaranga kurzii (Kuntze) Pax & K.Hoffm.

== L ==
- Macaranga laciniata Whitmore & Airy Shaw
- Macaranga lamellata Whitmore
- Macaranga lanceolata Pax & K.Hoffm.
- Macaranga latebrosa Gâteblé & McPherson
- Macaranga letestui Pellegr.
- Macaranga leytensis Merr.
- Macaranga lineata Airy Shaw
- Macaranga loheri Elmer
- Macaranga longicaudata L.M.Perry
- Macaranga longipetiolata De Wild.
- Macaranga longistipulata (Kurz ex Teijsm. & Binn.) Müll.Arg.
- Macaranga lophostigma Chiov.
- Macaranga louisiadum Airy Shaw
- Macaranga lowii King ex Hook.f.
- Macaranga lugubris Whitmore
- Macaranga lumiensis Whitmore
- Macaranga lutescens (Pax & Lingelsh.) Pax

== M ==
- Macaranga macropoda Baker
- Macaranga magna Turrill
- Macaranga magnifolia L.M.Perry
- Macaranga magnistipulosa Pax
- Macaranga mappa (L.) Müll.Arg.
- Macaranga marikoensis A.C.Sm.
- Macaranga mauritiana Bojer ex Baill.
- Macaranga megacarpa Airy Shaw
- Macaranga meiophylla S.Moore
- Macaranga melanosticta Airy Shaw
- Macaranga mellifera Prain
- Macaranga membranacea Müll.Arg.
- Macaranga minahassae Whitmore
- Macaranga misimae Airy Shaw
- Macaranga mista S.Moore
- Macaranga modesta Pax & K.Hoffm.
- Macaranga monandra Müll.Arg.
- Macaranga monostyla Whistler
- Macaranga montana Merr.
- Macaranga motleyana (Müll.Arg.) Müll.Arg.
- Macaranga myriantha Müll.Arg.
- Macaranga myriolepida Baker

== N ==
- Macaranga necopina Whitmore
- Macaranga neobritannica Airy Shaw
- Macaranga neodenticulata Whitmore
- Macaranga nicobarica N.P.Balakr. & Chakr.
- Macaranga noblei Elmer
- Macaranga novoguineensis J.J.Sm.
- Macaranga nusatenggarensis Whitmore

== O ==
- Macaranga oblongifolia Baill.
- Macaranga obovata Boivin ex Baill.
- Macaranga occidentalis (Müll.Arg.) Müll.Arg.
- Macaranga ovatifolia Merr.

== P ==
- Macaranga pachyphylla Müll.Arg.
- Macaranga palustris Whitmore
- Macaranga papuana (J.J.Sm.) Pax & K.Hoffm.
- Macaranga parabicolor Whitmore
- Macaranga parvibracteata Pax & K.Hoffm.
- Macaranga paxii Prain
- Macaranga pearsonii Merr.
- Macaranga peltata (Roxb.) Müll.Arg.
- Macaranga pentaloba S.J.Davies
- Macaranga pepysiana Whitmore
- Macaranga petanostyla Airy Shaw
- Macaranga pierreana Prain
- Macaranga pilosula Airy Shaw
- Macaranga platyclada Pax & K.Hoffm.
- Macaranga pleioneura Airy Shaw
- Macaranga pleiostemon Pax & K.Hoffm.
- Macaranga pleytei L.M.Perry
- Macaranga poggei Pax
- Macaranga polyadenia Pax & K.Hoffm.
- Macaranga polyneura Gilli
- Macaranga praestans Airy Shaw
- Macaranga pruinosa (Miq.) Müll.Arg.
- Macaranga puberula Heine
- Macaranga punctata K.Schum.
- Macaranga puncticulata Gage

== Q ==
- Macaranga quadriglandulosa Warb.

== R ==
- Macaranga racemohispida Whitmore
- Macaranga racemosa Baker
- Macaranga raivavaeensis H.St.John
- Macaranga ramiflora Elmer
- Macaranga rarispina Whitmore
- Macaranga recurvata Gage
- Macaranga reiteriana Pax & K.Hoffm.
- Macaranga repandodentata Airy Shaw
- Macaranga rhizinoides (Blume) Müll.Arg.
- Macaranga rhodonema Airy Shaw
- Macaranga ribesioides Baker
- Macaranga robinsonii Merr.
- Macaranga rorokae Whitmore
- Macaranga rostrata Heine
- Macaranga rufescens S.J.Davies
- Macaranga rufibarbis Warb.

== S ==
- Macaranga saccifera Pax
- Macaranga salicifolia Airy Shaw
- Macaranga salomonensis L.M.Perry
- Macaranga sampsonii Hance
- Macaranga sandsii Whitmore
- Macaranga sarcocarpa Airy Shaw
- Macaranga savaiiensis Whistler
- Macaranga schweinfurthii Pax
- Macaranga secunda Müll.Arg.
- Macaranga seemannii (Müll.Arg.) Müll.Arg.
- Macaranga serratifolia Whitmore
- Macaranga setosa Gage
- Macaranga siamensis S.J.Davies
- Macaranga similis Pax & K.Hoffm.
- Macaranga sinensis (Baill.) Müll.Arg.
- Macaranga spathicalyx Whitmore & S.J.Davies
- Macaranga sphaerophylla Baker
- Macaranga spinosa Müll.Arg.
- Macaranga staudtii Pax
- Macaranga stellimontium Whitmore
- Macaranga stenophylla Pax & K.Hoffm.
- Macaranga sterrophylla L.M.Perry
- Macaranga stipulosa Müll.Arg.
- Macaranga stolonifera W.N.Takeuchi
- Macaranga stonei Whitmore
- Macaranga strigosa Pax & K.Hoffm.
- Macaranga strigosissima Airy Shaw
- Macaranga subdentata Benth.
- Macaranga subpeltata K.Schum. & Lauterb.
- Macaranga suleensis Whitmore
- Macaranga sumatrana Müll.Arg.
- Macaranga suwo Whitmore
- Macaranga sylvatica Elmer

== T ==
- Macaranga taitensis (Müll.Arg.) Müll.Arg.
- Macaranga tanarius (L.) Müll.Arg.
- Macaranga tchibangensis Pellegr.
- Macaranga tentaculata Airy Shaw
- Macaranga tessellata Gage
- Macaranga teysmannii (Zoll.) Müll.Arg.
- Macaranga thomasii Whitmore
- Macaranga thompsonii Merr.
- Macaranga thorelii Gagnep.
- Macaranga trachyphylla Airy Shaw
- Macaranga trichanthera L.M.Perry
- Macaranga trichocarpa (Zoll.) Müll.Arg.
- Macaranga triloba (Thunb.) Müll.Arg.
- Macaranga truncata J.Florence
- Macaranga tsonane Whitmore

== U ==
- Macaranga umbrosa S.J.Davies
- Macaranga uxoris Whitmore

== V ==
- Macaranga vanderystii De Wild.
- Macaranga vedeliana (Baill.) Müll.Arg.
- Macaranga velutina (Rchb.f. & Zoll.) Müll.Arg.
- Macaranga velutiniflora S.J.Davies
- Macaranga venosa J.W.Moore
- Macaranga vermoesenii De Wild.
- Macaranga versteeghii L.M.Perry
- Macaranga vieillardii (Müll.Arg.) Müll.Arg.
- Macaranga villosula Pax & K.Hoffm.
- Macaranga vitiensis Pax & K.Hoffm.

== W ==
- Macaranga warburgiana Pax & K.Hoffm.
- Macaranga waturandangii Whitmore
- Macaranga whitmorei Airy Shaw
- Macaranga winkleri Pax & K.Hoffm.
- Macaranga winkleriella Whitmore

== Y ==
- Macaranga yakasii Airy Shaw
