= Bingabing =

Bingabing is a common name for several plants and may refer to:

- Macaranga grandifolia, endemic to the Philippines
- Macaranga mappa
