= Dichomeris microdoxa =

Scientific classification
- Kingdom: Animalia
- Phylum: Arthropoda
- Class: Insecta
- Order: Lepidoptera
- Family: Gelechiidae
- Genus: Dichomeris
- Species: D. microdoxa

Binomial name
- Dichomeris microdoxa (Meyrick, 1932)

Synonyms
- Gaesa microdoxa Meyrick, 1932

Species of moth

Dichomeris microdoxa is a moth in the family Gelechiidae. It was described by Edward Meyrick in 1932. It is found on Java in Indonesia.

The larvae feed on Macaranga species.
