= Heartleaf =

Heartleaf or heart leaf is a common name for several plants and may refer to:

- Hexastylis, a genus native to North America
- Macaranga tanarius, a species native to southeast Asia and Australia
