= Macaranga puncticulata =

Scientific classification
- Kingdom: Plantae
- Clade: Tracheophytes
- Clade: Angiosperms
- Clade: Eudicots
- Clade: Rosids
- Order: Malpighiales
- Family: Euphorbiaceae
- Genus: Macaranga
- Species: M. puncticulata

Binomial name
- Macaranga puncticulata Gage

Species of tree

Macaranga puncticulata is a tree in the family Euphorbiaceae. It is endemic to the tropical peat swamp forests of South East Asia.
