= Macaranga huahineensis =

Conservation status
- Vulnerable (IUCN 3.1)

Scientific classification
- Kingdom: Plantae
- Clade: Embryophytes
- Clade: Tracheophytes
- Clade: Angiosperms
- Clade: Eudicots
- Clade: Rosids
- Order: Malpighiales
- Family: Euphorbiaceae
- Genus: Macaranga
- Species: M. huahineensis

Binomial name
- Macaranga huahineensis J.Florence (1996)

Species of flowering plant

Macaranga huahineensis is a species of flowering plant in the family Euphorbiaceae. It is a tree endemic to the island of Huahine in the Society Islands of French Polynesia.
