= Macaranga bicolor =

Conservation status
- Least Concern (IUCN 3.1)

Scientific classification
- Kingdom: Plantae
- Clade: Tracheophytes
- Clade: Angiosperms
- Clade: Eudicots
- Clade: Rosids
- Order: Malpighiales
- Family: Euphorbiaceae
- Genus: Macaranga
- Species: M. bicolor

Binomial name
- Macaranga bicolor Muell.-Arg.

Species of flowering plant

Macaranga bicolor is a species of plant in the family Euphorbiaceae. It is endemic to the Philippines.
