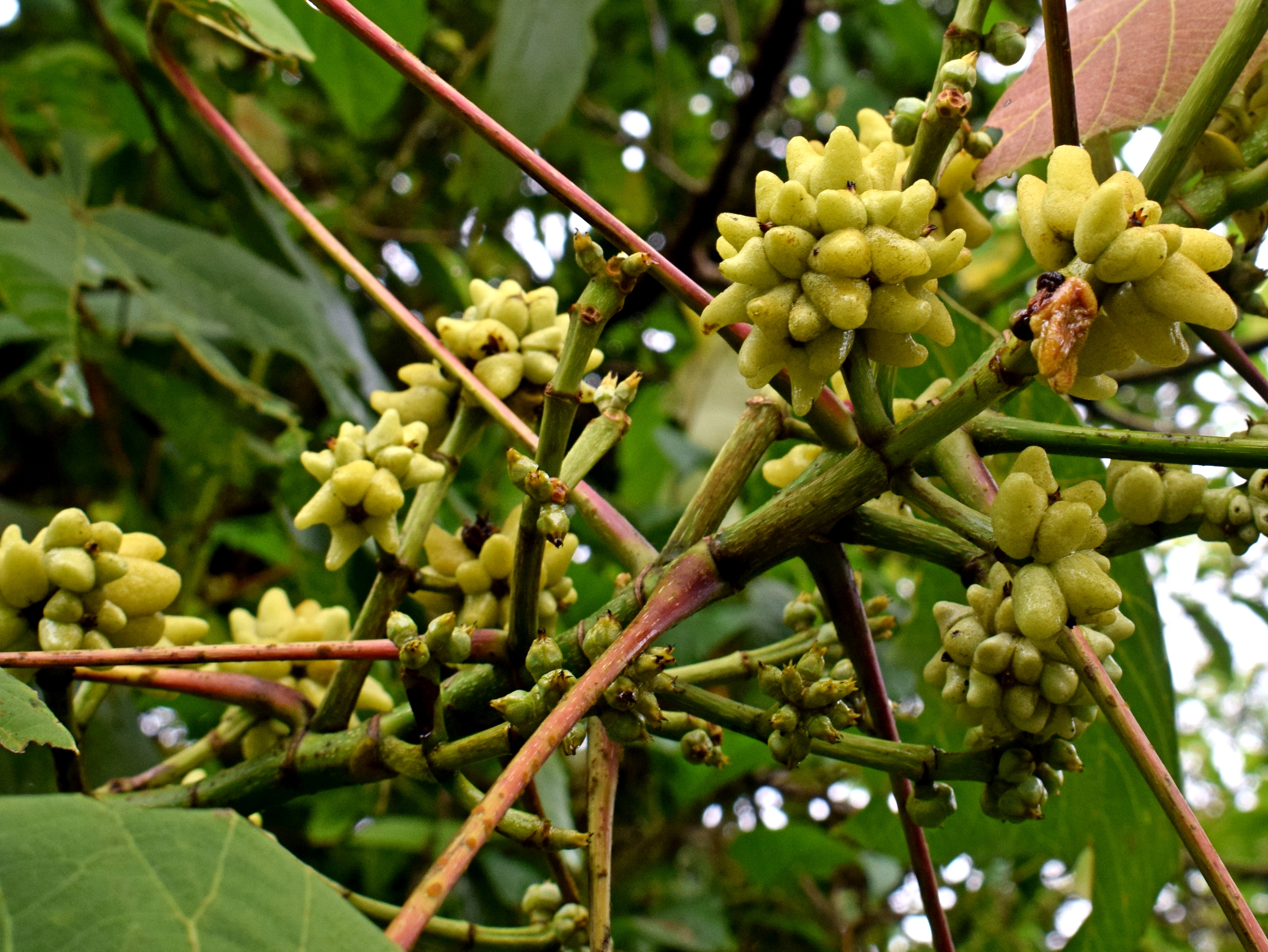
- M. triloba Bogor, Indonesia

Scientific classification
- Kingdom: Plantae
- Clade: Tracheophytes
- Clade: Angiosperms
- Clade: Eudicots
- Clade: Rosids
- Order: Malpighiales
- Family: Euphorbiaceae
- Subfamily: Acalyphoideae
- Tribe: Acalypheae
- Subtribe: Macaranginae
- Genus: Macaranga
- Species: M. triloba

Binomial name
- Macaranga triloba (Thunb.) Müll.Arg.

Synonyms
- Macaranga cornuta Müll.Arg.; Macaranga quadricornis Ridl.; Pachystemon trilobus (Thunb.) Blume; Rininus trilobus Thunb.; Tanarius cornutus (Müll.Arg.) Kuntze; Tanarius trilobus (Thunb.) Kuntze

= Macaranga triloba =

Southeastern Asian forest tree

Macaranga triloba is a species of plant in the family Euphorbiaceae. It is native to the tropical forests of southeastern Asia. It is a pioneer species, colonising recently cleared or burnt areas of the forest.

== Description ==
A small, spreading tree, M. triloba grows to a height of about 20 m (66 ft). The trunk is a light greyish-brown with smooth bark, and the twigs and shoots are largely devoid of hairs. The leaves are tri-lobed and peltate, with toothed margins. Each leaf has two erect, leathery stipules that are ovate, slightly recurved and do not encircle the stem. The inflorescence is a panicle with minute reddish-brown flowers. The fruits are rounded, sticky and yellow when ripe, the carpels developing long, horn-like processes. The fruits are about 12 mm (0.5 in) long and 7 mm (0.3 in) wide.

== Distribution and habitat ==
Macaranga triloba occurs in Indo-China, the Malay Peninsula, Singapore, Sumatra, Java and the Philippines. It grows in a range of habitats including the edges of swamp forests and dry dipterocarp forests, at altitudes up to about 1,400 m (4,600 ft).

== Ecology ==
Along with other members of its genus, M. triloba is a pioneer species. In 1982 and 1983, fires devastated the Bukit Soeharto Education Forest, in East Kalimantan, Indonesia. By 1988, the canopy was dominated by a number of tall dipterocarps up to 55 m (180 ft) tall which had survived the blaze, and elsewhere by shorter Macaranga species including Macaranga triloba which had sprung up since the fires and formed a canopy at about 11 m (36 ft). In a section of forest regenerating after slash-and-burn forest clearances, Macaranga species predominated after fifteen years, but by thirty years were being replaced by Shorea parvifolia and Pentace laxiflora.

This plant has a mutualistic relationship with predatory ants of the Crematogaster genus. The tree has hollow twigs in which the ants make their nest and provides the ants with food bodies located on the leaf stipules; the ants feed on these and defend the tree against herbivorous insects. Many fewer food bodies are produced by trees that have no ants inhabiting them than are produced by those where ants are present.

== Gallery ==
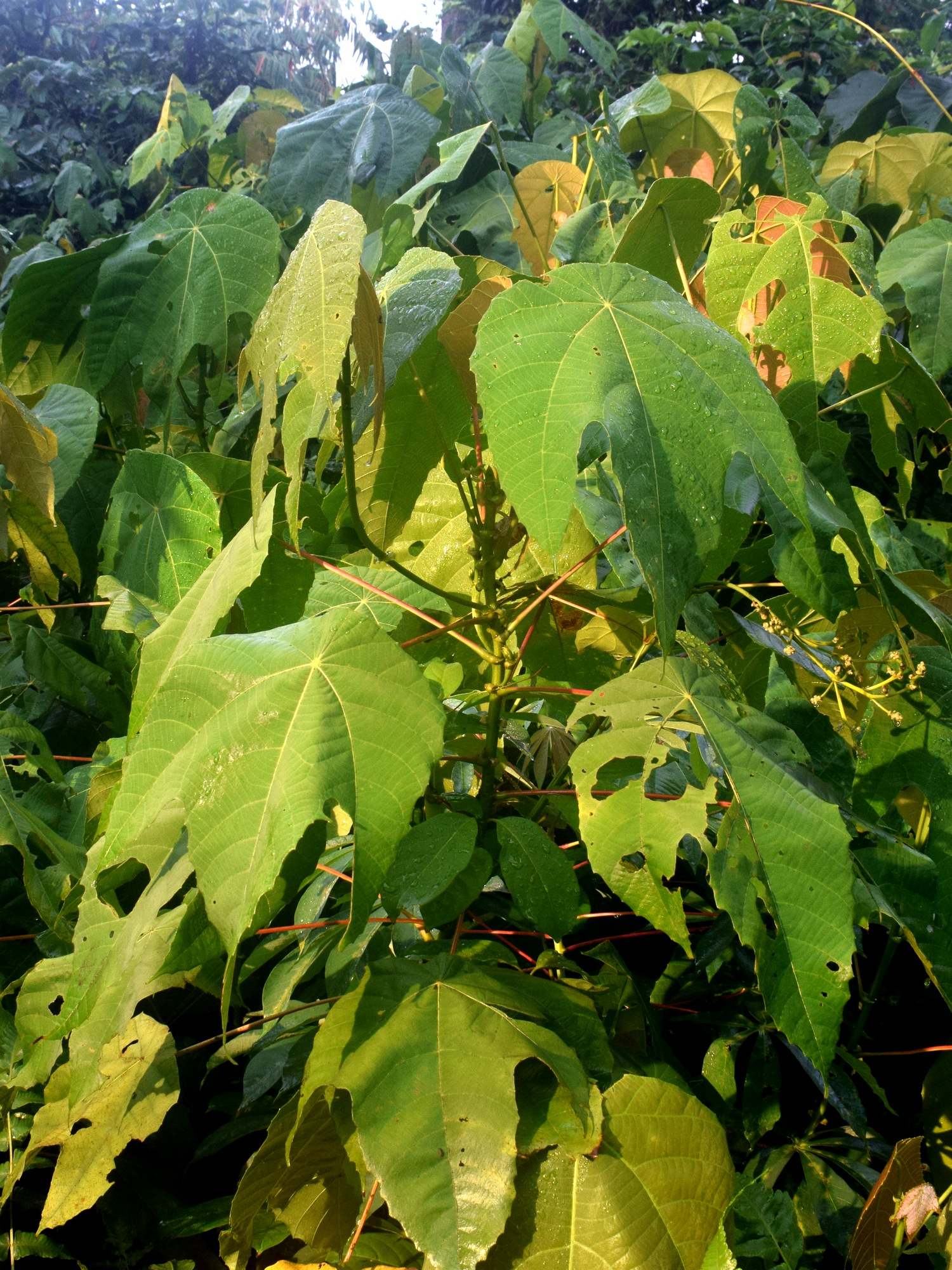

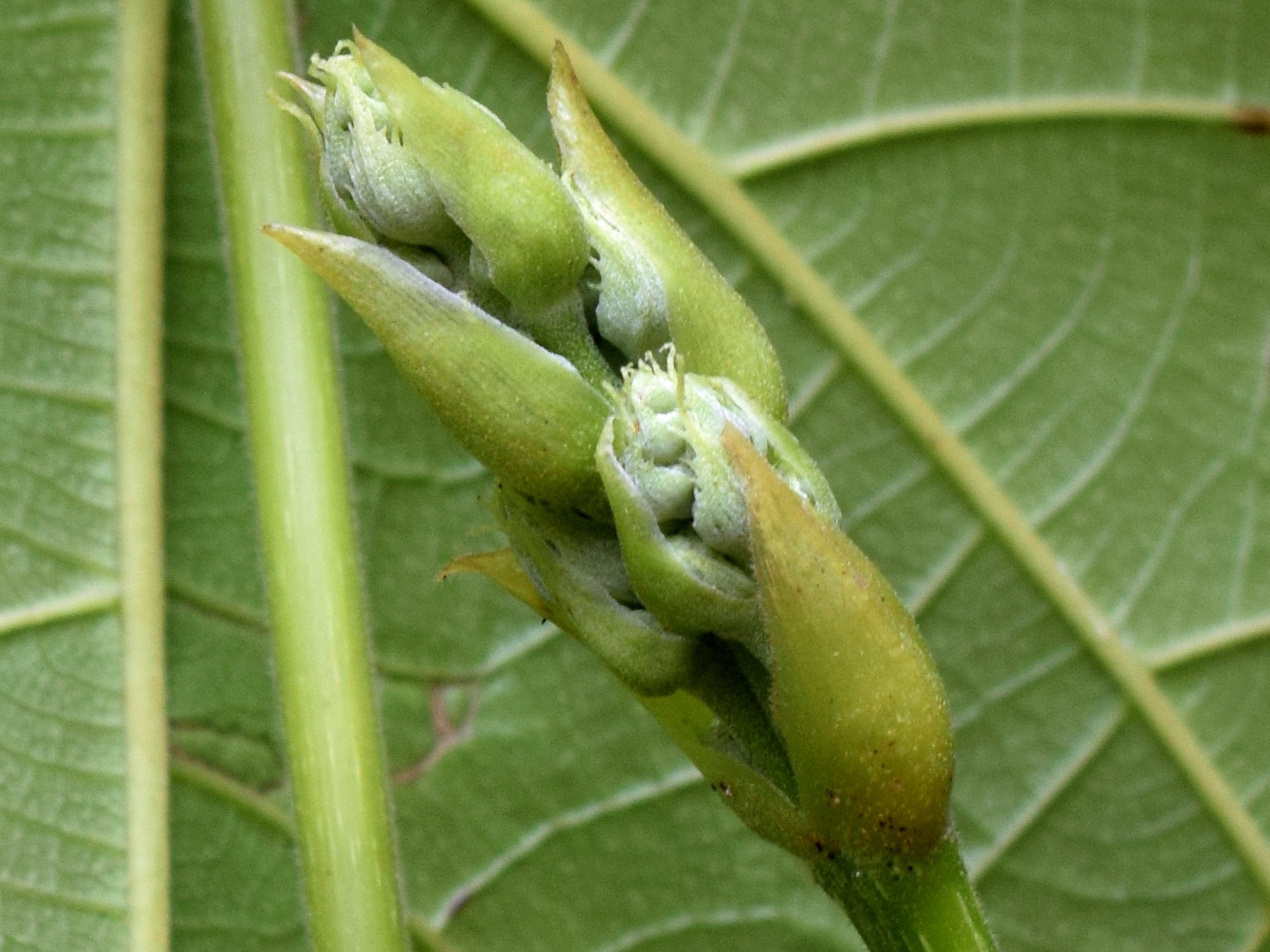

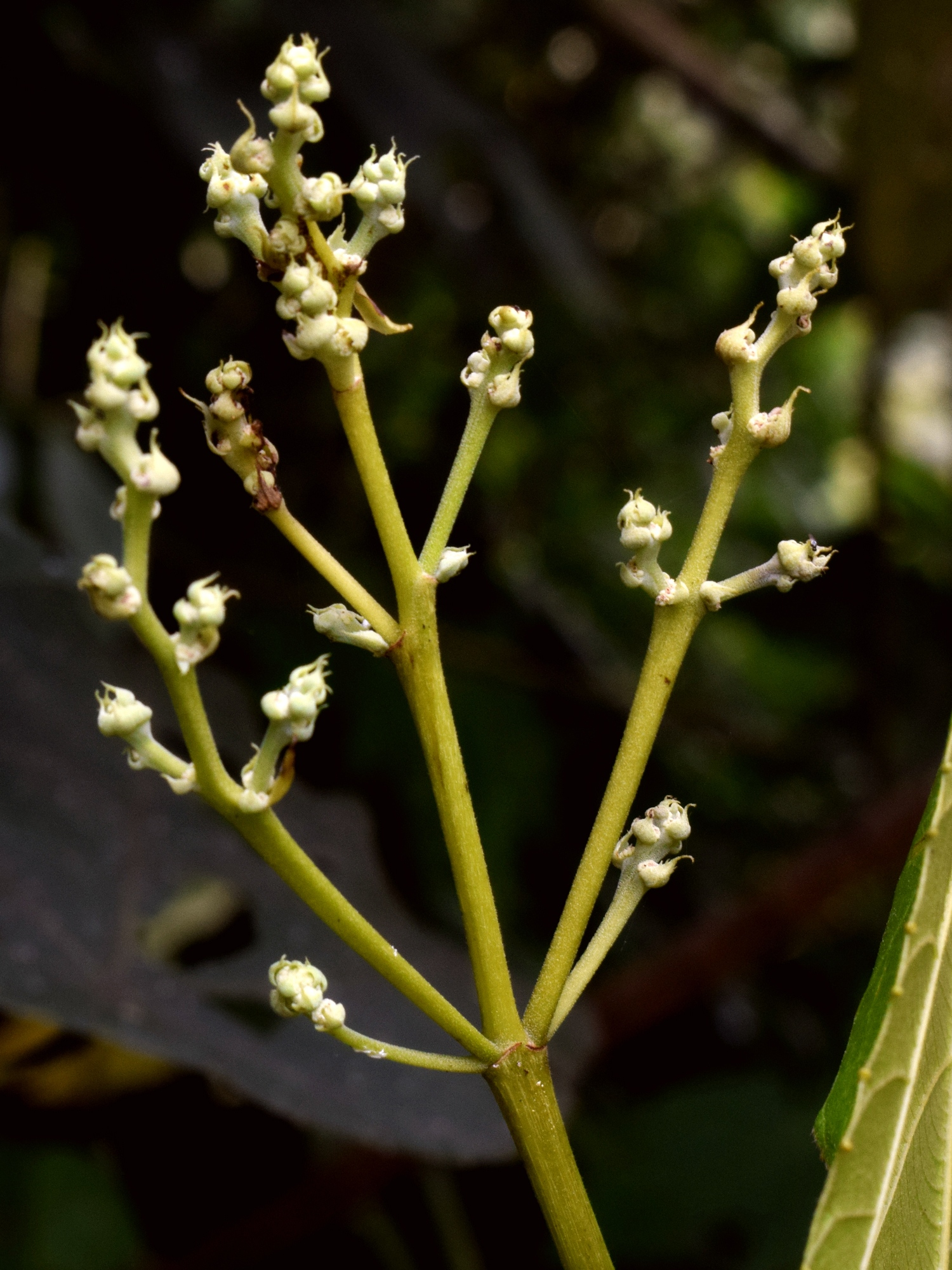

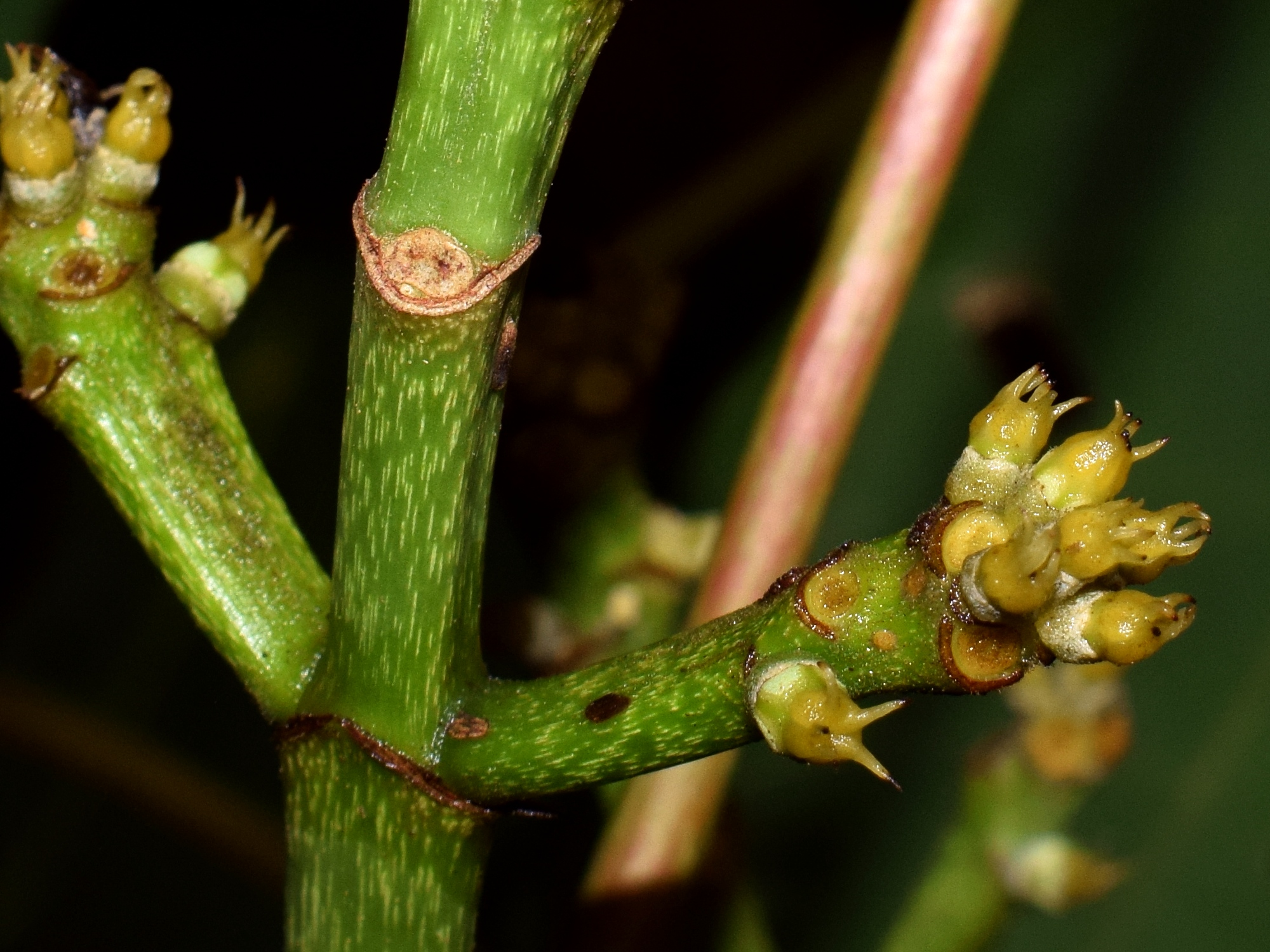

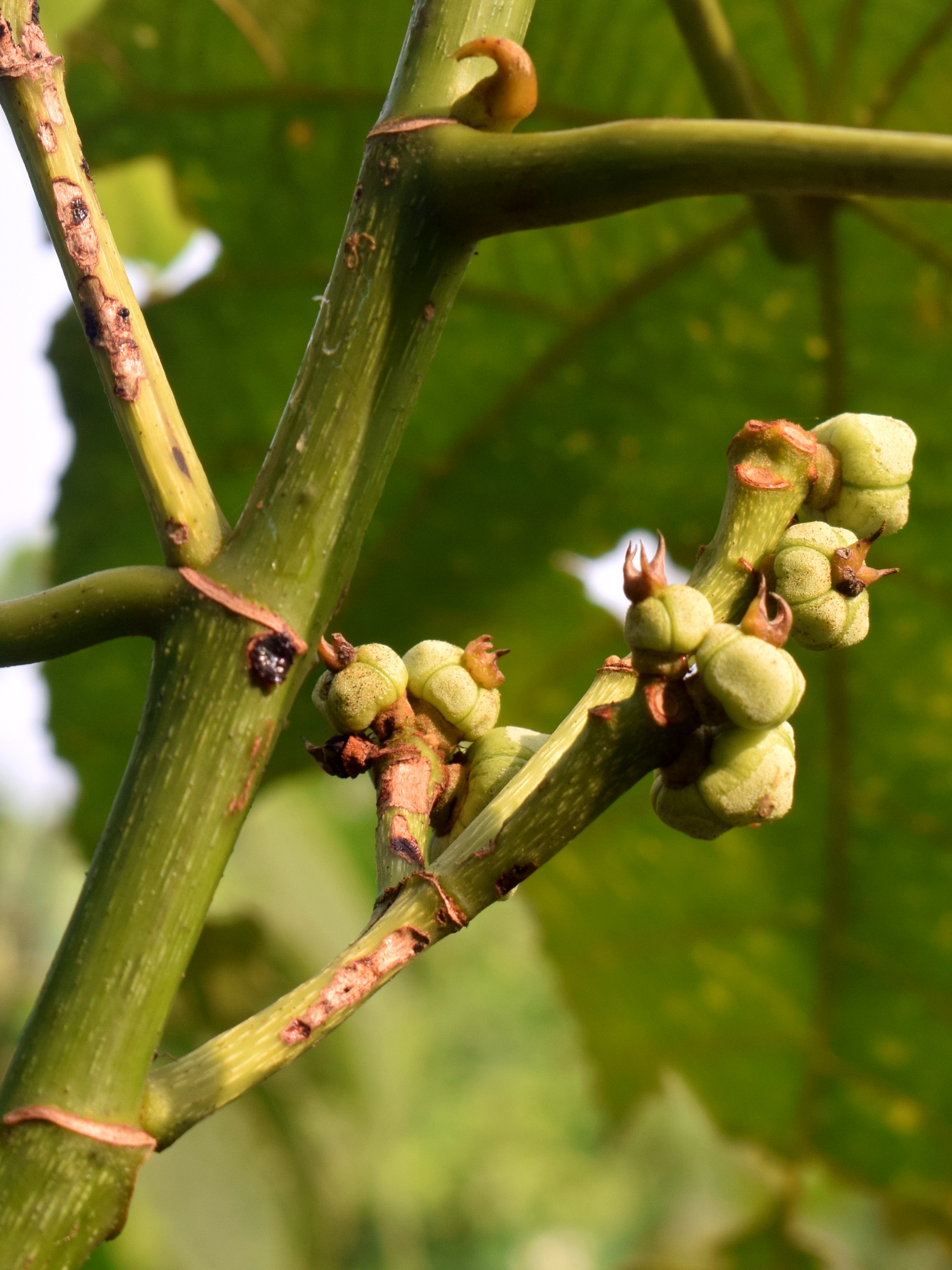
