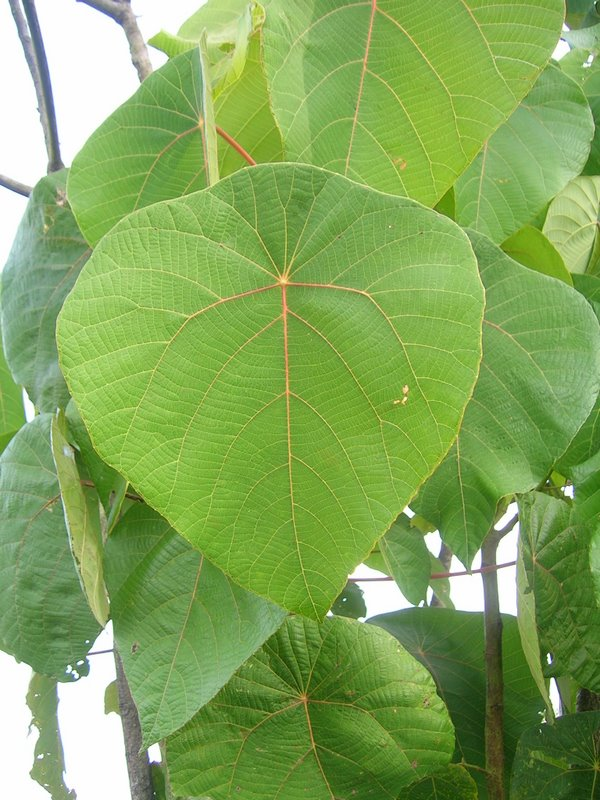
- Macaranga peltata

Scientific classification
- Kingdom: Plantae
- Clade: Tracheophytes
- Clade: Angiosperms
- Clade: Eudicots
- Clade: Rosids
- Order: Malpighiales
- Family: Euphorbiaceae
- Subfamily: Acalyphoideae
- Tribe: Acalypheae
- Subtribe: Macaranginae
- Genus: Macaranga; Thouars

Type species
- Macaranga mauritiana Bojer ex Baill.

Diversity
- c. 300 species

Synonyms
- Adenoceras Rchb.f. & Zoll. ex Baill.; Mappa A.Juss.; Mecostylis Kurz ex Teijsm. & Binn.; Pachystemon Blume; Panopia Noronha ex Thouars; Phocea Seem.; Tanarius Rumph. ex Kuntze; Bruea Gaudich.

= Macaranga =

Genus of tropic trees

Macaranga is a large genus of Old World tropical trees of the family Euphorbiaceae and the only genus in the subtribe Macaranginae (tribe Acalypheae). Native to Africa, Australasia, Asia and various islands of the Indian and Pacific Oceans, the genus comprises over 300 different species. It was first described as a genus in 1806, based on specimens collected on the Island of Mauritius. Many species, such as Macaranga gigantea have uncommonly large leaves, and many are peltate.

Macaranga are noted for being pioneer species. Macaranga species are used as food plants by the larvae of some Lepidoptera species including Endoclita malabaricus. Macaranga species often form symbioses with ant (Formicidae) species (particularly Crematogaster ants of the subgenus Decacrema) because they have hollow stems that can serve as nesting space and occasionally provide nectar. The trees benefit because the ants attack herbivorous insects and either drive them away or feed on them.

== Uses ==
- Macaranga gum, a crimson resin, is obtained from Macaranga indica.
- Macaranga tanarius leaves are used by the Rungus indigenous people in Sabah, Malaysia to pack cooked rice into bundles to preserve it and impart a pleasant aroma.

== Selected species ==
- Macaranga attenuata J.W.Moore – Society Islands
- Macaranga bancana (Miq.) Müll.Arg.
- Macaranga beillei Prain
- Macaranga bicolor Müll.Arg.
- Macaranga capensis (Baill.) Sim
- Macaranga carolinensis Volkens
- Macaranga caudatifolia Elmer
- Macaranga congestiflora Merr.
- Macaranga conglomerata Brenan
- Macaranga denticulata (Blume) Müll.Arg.
- Macaranga gigantea (Rchb.f. & Zoll.) Müll.Arg.
- Macaranga grandifolia (Blanco) Merr.
- Macaranga huahineensis J.Florence
- Macaranga indica Wight
- Macaranga mauritiana Bojer ex Baill.
- Macaranga novoguineensis J.J.Sm.
- Macaranga paxii Prain
- Macaranga peltata (Roxb.) Müll.Arg.
- Macaranga polyadenia Pax & K.Hoffm.
- Macaranga puncticulata Gage
- Macaranga raivavaeensis H.St.John
- Macaranga taitensis (Müll.Arg.) Müll.Arg.
- Macaranga tanarius (L.) Müll.Arg.
- Macaranga trichocarpa (Zoll.) Müll.Arg.
- Macaranga triloba (Thunb.) Müll.Arg.
- Macaranga venosa J.W.Moore
