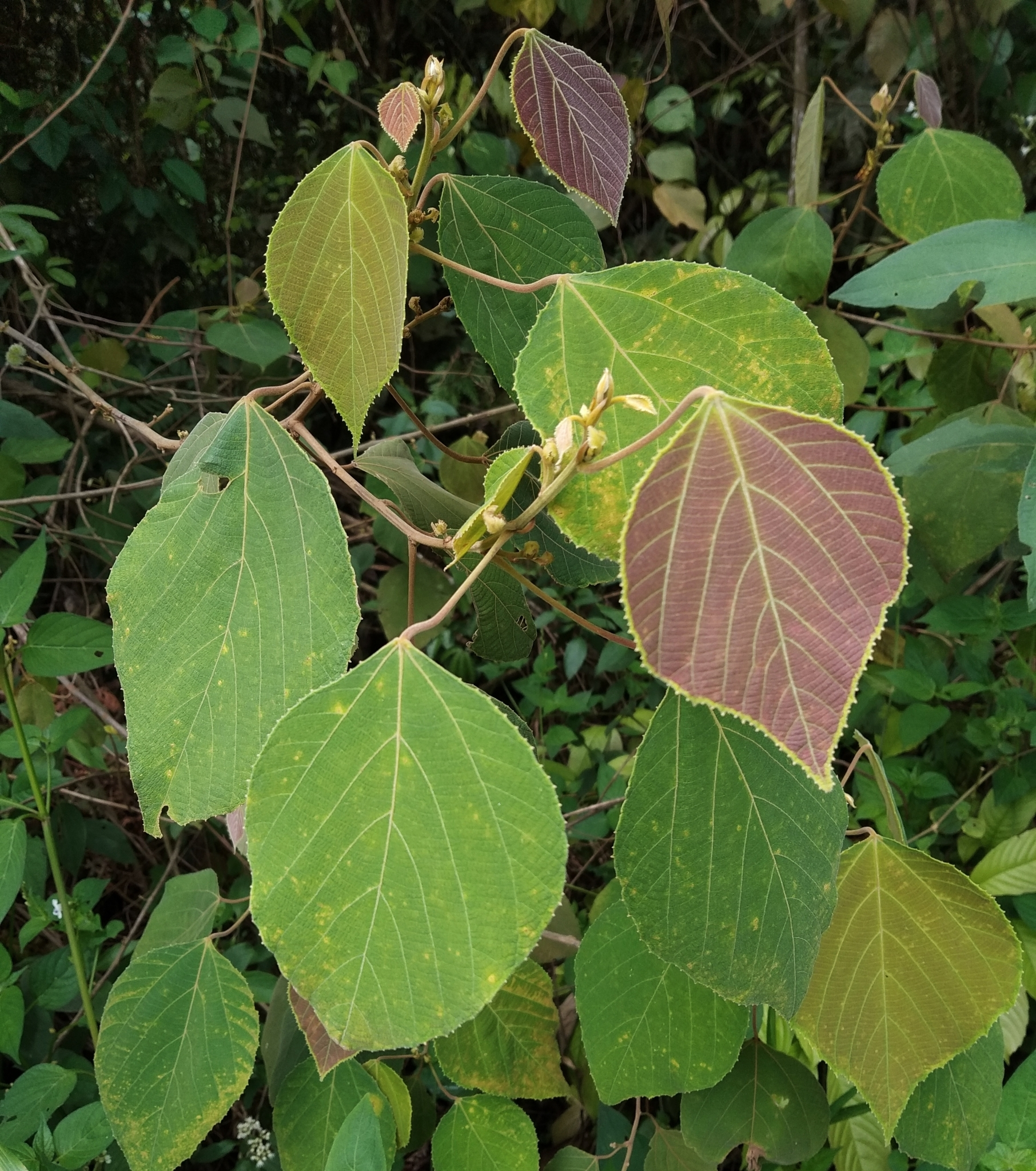
- M. trichocarpa leaves, Sumatra

Scientific classification
- Kingdom: Plantae
- Clade: Tracheophytes
- Clade: Angiosperms
- Clade: Eudicots
- Clade: Rosids
- Order: Malpighiales
- Family: Euphorbiaceae
- Genus: Macaranga
- Species: M. trichocarpa

Binomial name
- Macaranga trichocarpa (Zoll.) Müll.Arg.

Synonyms
- List: Tanarius trichocarpus (Zoll.) Kuntze Tanarius minutiflorus (Müll.Arg.) Kuntze Tanarius helferi (Müll.Arg.) Kuntze Tanarius borneensis (Müll.Arg.) Kuntze Mappa zollingeriana Miq. Mappa trichocarpa Zoll. Macaranga minutiflora Müll.Arg. Macaranga helferi Müll.Arg. Macaranga borneensis Müll.Arg.

= Macaranga trichocarpa =

Species of tree

Macaranga trichocarpa is a species of Asian small trees in the family Euphorbiaceae and tribe Acalypheae, found especially in secondary tropical forests. No subspecies are listed in the Catalogue of Life and the recorded distribution includes Indo-China and western Malesia, including Borneo.
