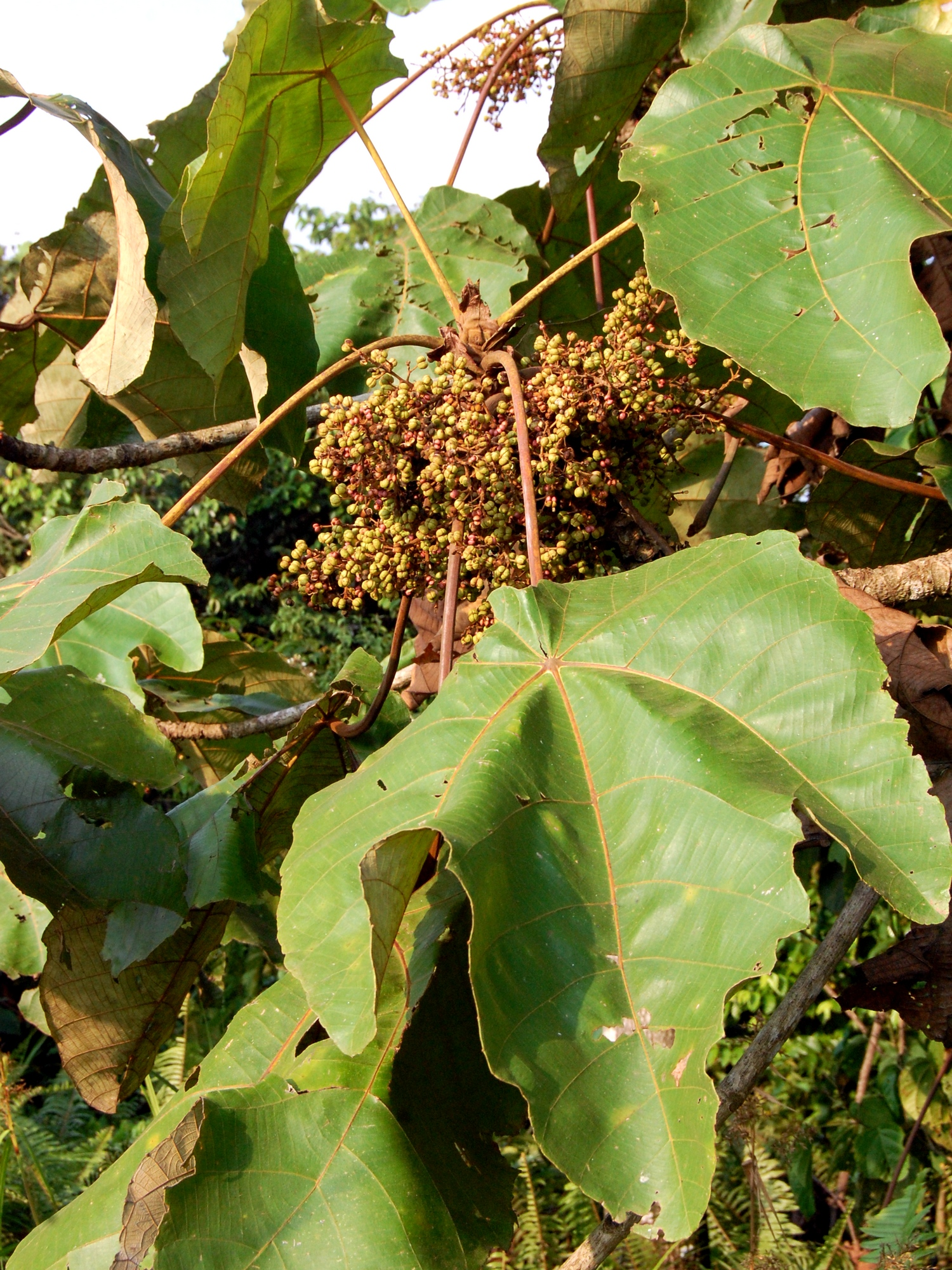
- Merkubung, Macaranga gigantea from Seruyan Regency, Central Kalimantan, Indonesia

Scientific classification
- Kingdom: Plantae
- Clade: Tracheophytes
- Clade: Angiosperms
- Clade: Eudicots
- Clade: Rosids
- Order: Malpighiales
- Family: Euphorbiaceae
- Genus: Macaranga
- Species: M. gigantea

Binomial name
- Macaranga gigantea (Reichb.f. & Zoll.) Müll. Arg.

Synonyms
- Mappa gigantea Reichb.f. & Zoll. (basionym); Mappa macrophylla Kurz ex Teijsm. & Binn. (nom.illeg.); Mappa megalophylla Müll.Arg.; Mappa rugosa Mull.Arg.; Macaranga incisa Gage; Macaranga megalophylla (Müll.Arg) Müll.Arg.; Macaranga rugosa (Müll.Arg.) Müll.Arg.; Rottlera gigantea (Rchb.f. & Zoll.) Rchb.f. & Zoll. ex Kurz; Tanarius giganteus (Rchb.f. & Zoll.) Kuntze; Tanarius megallophyllus (Müll.Arg.) Kuntze; Tanarius rugosus (Müll.Arg.) Kuntze

= Macaranga gigantea =

Species of tree

Macaranga gigantea Common name Chia Kubet, (synonym Macaranga megalophylla) is a pioneer tree species in the spurge family Euphorbiaceae from western Indo-China and Malesia from southern Myanmar south to Sumatra and east to Sulawesi. It is a small tree growing to 15 metres tall, rarely to 25 metres. The leaves are peltate, tricuspidate and are typically up to 60 centimetres (24 in) long and wide on a petiole of comparable length.
