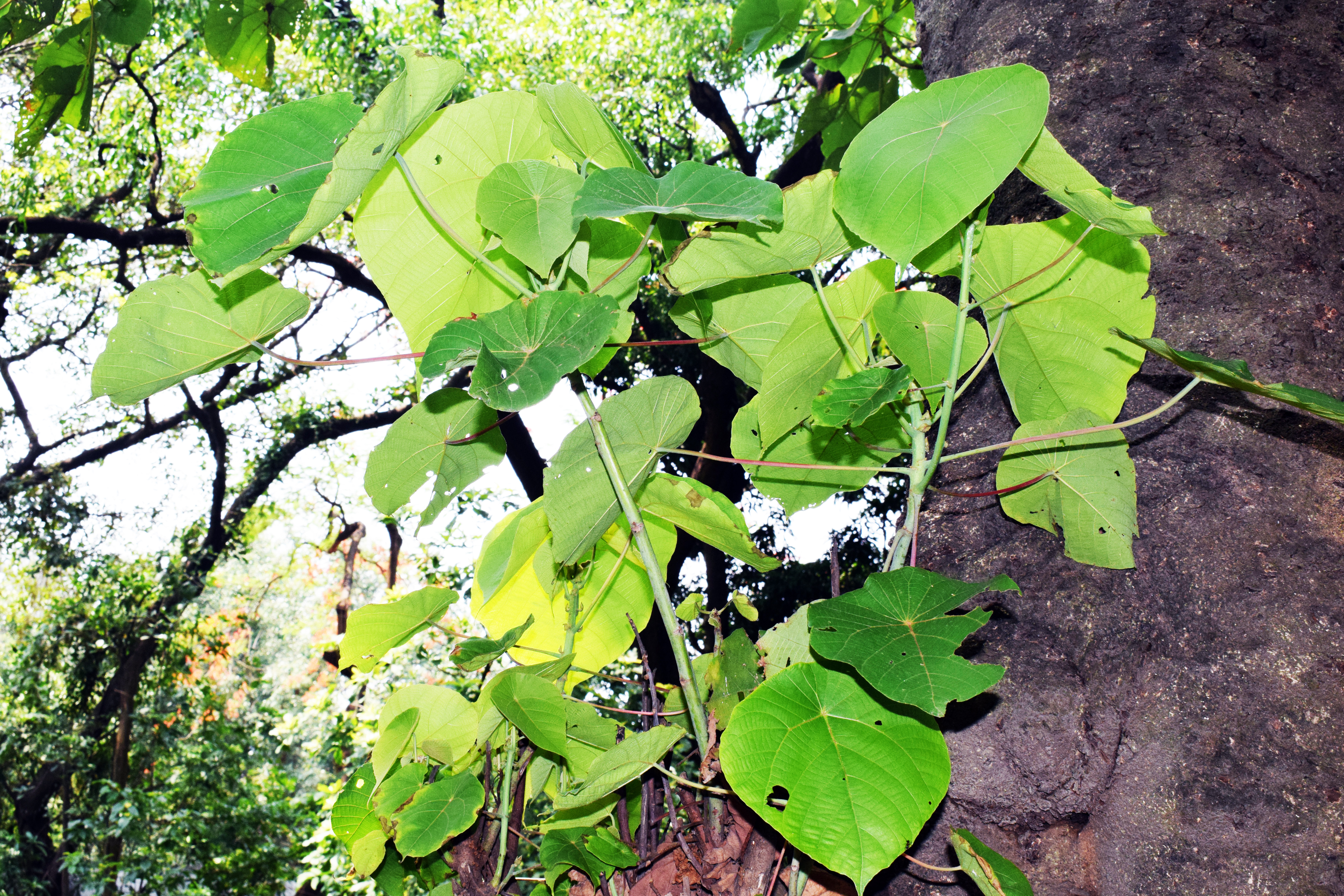
- Macaranga indica

Conservation status
- Least Concern (IUCN 3.1)

Scientific classification
- Kingdom: Plantae
- Clade: Tracheophytes
- Clade: Angiosperms
- Clade: Eudicots
- Clade: Rosids
- Order: Malpighiales
- Family: Euphorbiaceae
- Genus: Macaranga
- Species: M. indica

Binomial name
- Macaranga indica Wight

Synonyms
- Macaranga adenantha Gagnep.; Tanarius indicus (Wight) Kuntze; Trewia hernandifolia Roth

= Macaranga indica =

Species of flowering plant

Macaranga indica is a heliophilous evergreen plant native to South and Southeast Asia and China. A crimson colored resin called "macaranga gum" is obtained from this plant. Many parts of the plant are used for ayurvedic medicine in India and Sri Lanka.

== Description ==
Macaranga indica is a resinous tree, up to 16 metres (52 ft) tall. The grayish bark is smooth in texture. Its leaves are simple and alternately arranged, peltate, orbicular-ovate, apex is acuminate, and palmately 8 to 9-nerved. The unisexual flowers are dioecious. The one-seeded fruit is a globose capsule.
