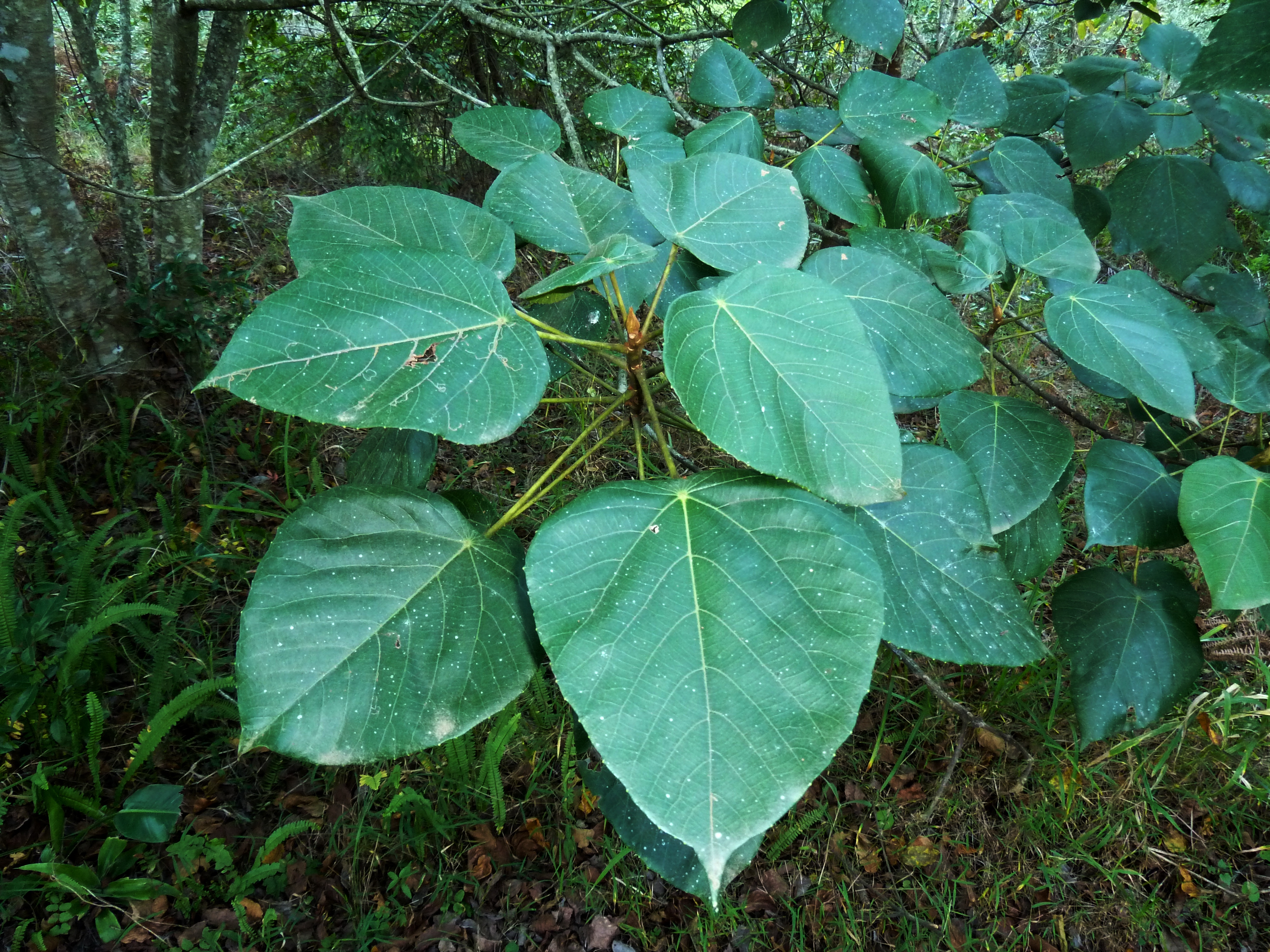

Conservation status
- Least Concern (IUCN 3.1)

Scientific classification
- Kingdom: Plantae
- Clade: Tracheophytes
- Clade: Angiosperms
- Clade: Eudicots
- Clade: Rosids
- Order: Malpighiales
- Family: Euphorbiaceae
- Genus: Macaranga
- Species: M. capensis

Binomial name
- Macaranga capensis (Baill.) Sim (1907)

Synonyms
- Macaranga bachmannii Pax (1897); Macaranga inopinata Prain (1912); Macaranga multiglandulosa Pax & K.Hoffm. (1914); Macaranga ruwenzorica Pax (1909); Macaranga usambarica Pax & K.Hoffm. (1914); Mallotus capensis (Baill.) Müll.Arg. (1865); Mappa capensis Baill. (1862) (basionym)

= Macaranga capensis =

Species of flowering plant

Macaranga capensis is a species of flowering plant in the spurge family, Euphorbiaceae. It is a tree native to sub-Saharan Africa, ranging through eastern and southern Africa from southern Ethiopia to the Eastern Cape Province of South Africa, with an outlier population in Gabon in west-central Africa.

Macaranga capensis is a medium to large deciduous tree, typically 4.5 to 18 metres (15 to 59 ft) tall and occasionally up to 25 metres (82 ft). It has a rounded spreading crown. It typically has a straight bole, and the trunk and branches are armed with short spines. The leaves are large, shiny, and dark green, ovate to triangular-ovate, 100–150 mm (3.9–5.9 in) long by 80–120 mm (3.1–4.7 in) wide, with a short drip-tip at the apex. Flowers grow in clusters of small creamy white or yellow blooms.

It generally grows in evergreen forests and along stream banks.

The tree is harvested from the wild for timber and for local medicinal uses. It is planted as a shade or garden tree.
