= Macaranga attenuata =

Conservation status
- Vulnerable (IUCN 3.1)

Scientific classification
- Kingdom: Plantae
- Clade: Embryophytes
- Clade: Tracheophytes
- Clade: Angiosperms
- Clade: Eudicots
- Clade: Rosids
- Order: Malpighiales
- Family: Euphorbiaceae
- Genus: Macaranga
- Species: M. attenuata

Binomial name
- Macaranga attenuata J.W.Moore

Species of flowering plant

Macaranga attenuata is a species of flowering plant in the family Euphorbiaceae. It is a tree endemic to the Society Islands of French Polynesia, where it is found on Moorea and Raiatea. It grows in lowland tropical moist forests. It is threatened by competition from invasive plant species including Miconia calvescens, Spathodea campanulata, and Tecoma stans, and increasingly frequent and/or intense fires.
