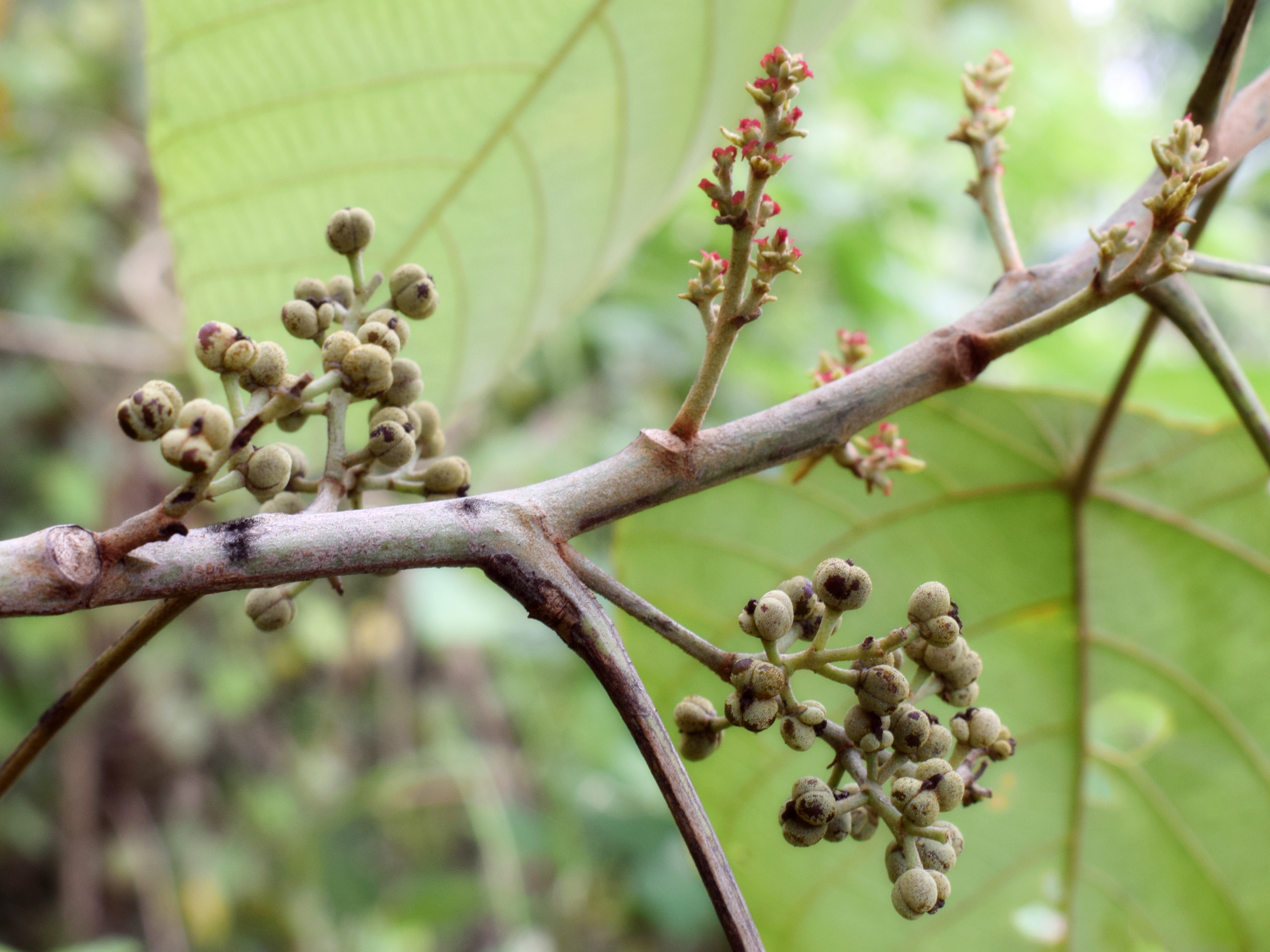
- In southern Sumatra

Conservation status
- Least Concern (IUCN 3.1)

Scientific classification
- Kingdom: Plantae
- Clade: Tracheophytes
- Clade: Angiosperms
- Clade: Eudicots
- Clade: Rosids
- Order: Malpighiales
- Family: Euphorbiaceae
- Genus: Macaranga
- Species: M. denticulata

Binomial name
- Macaranga denticulata (Blume) Müll.Arg.

Synonyms
- List: Tanarius pustulatus (King ex Hook.f.) Kuntze Tanarius perakensis (Hook.f.) Kuntze Tanarius paniculatus Kuntze Tanarius gmelinifolius (King ex Hook.f.) Kuntze Tanarius denticulatus (Blume) Kuntze Tanarius chatinianus (Baill.) Kuntze Rottlera glauca Hassk. Mappa wallichii Müll.Arg. Mappa truncata Müll.Arg. Mappa gummiflua Miq. Mappa denticulata Blume Mappa chatiniana Baill. Macaranga pustulata King ex Hook.f. Macaranga perakensis Hook.f. Macaranga henricorum Hemsl. Macaranga gummiflua (Miq.) Müll.Arg. Macaranga gmelinifolia King ex Hook.f. Macaranga denticulata var. pustulata

= Macaranga denticulata =

Species of tree

Macaranga denticulata is a species of Asian small trees in the family Euphorbiaceae and tribe Acalypheae, found especially in secondary tropical forests. No subspecies are listed in the Catalogue of Life and the recorded distribution includes: the Indian subcontinent, southern China, Indo-China and western Malesia.

== Gallery ==
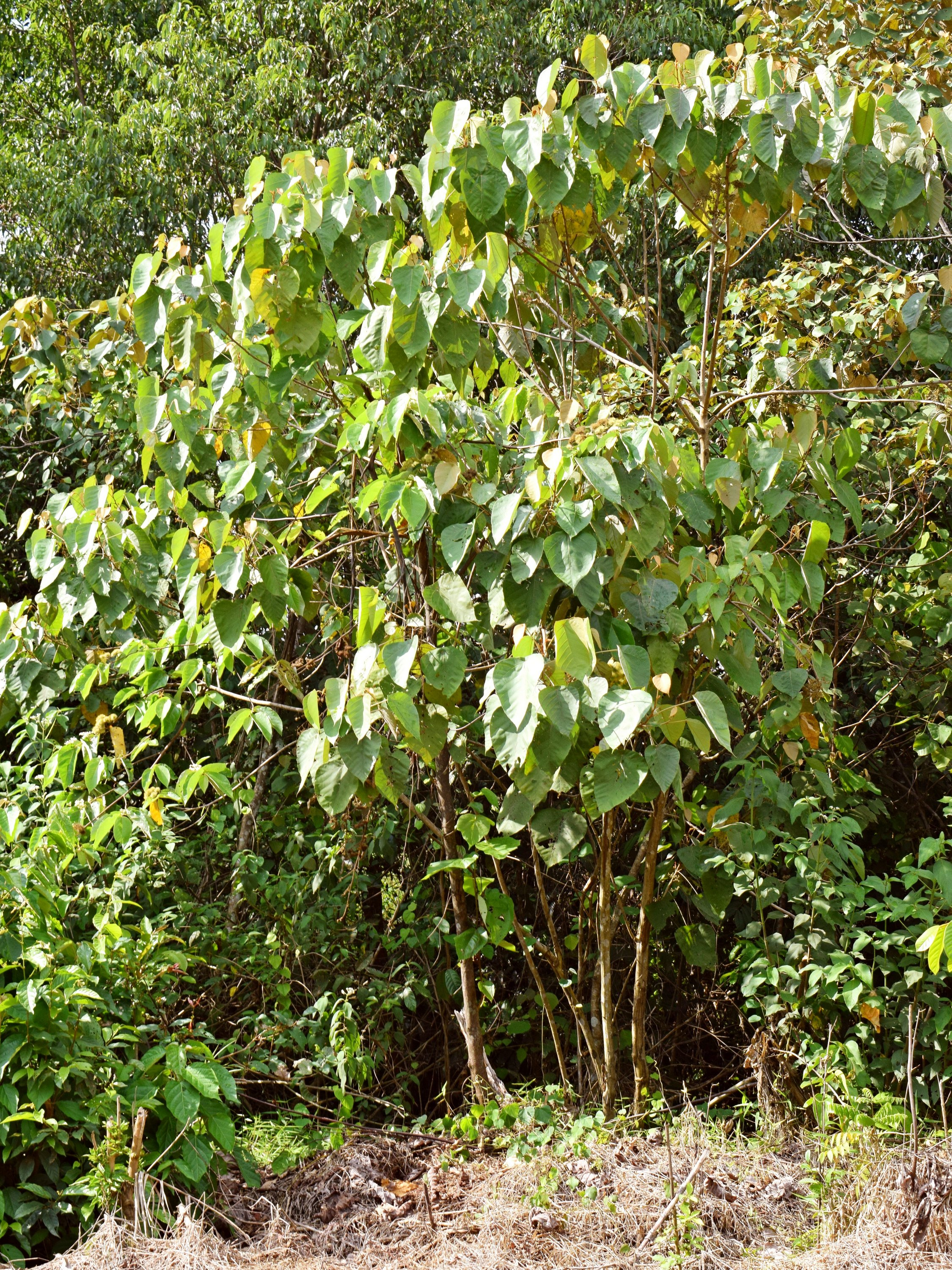

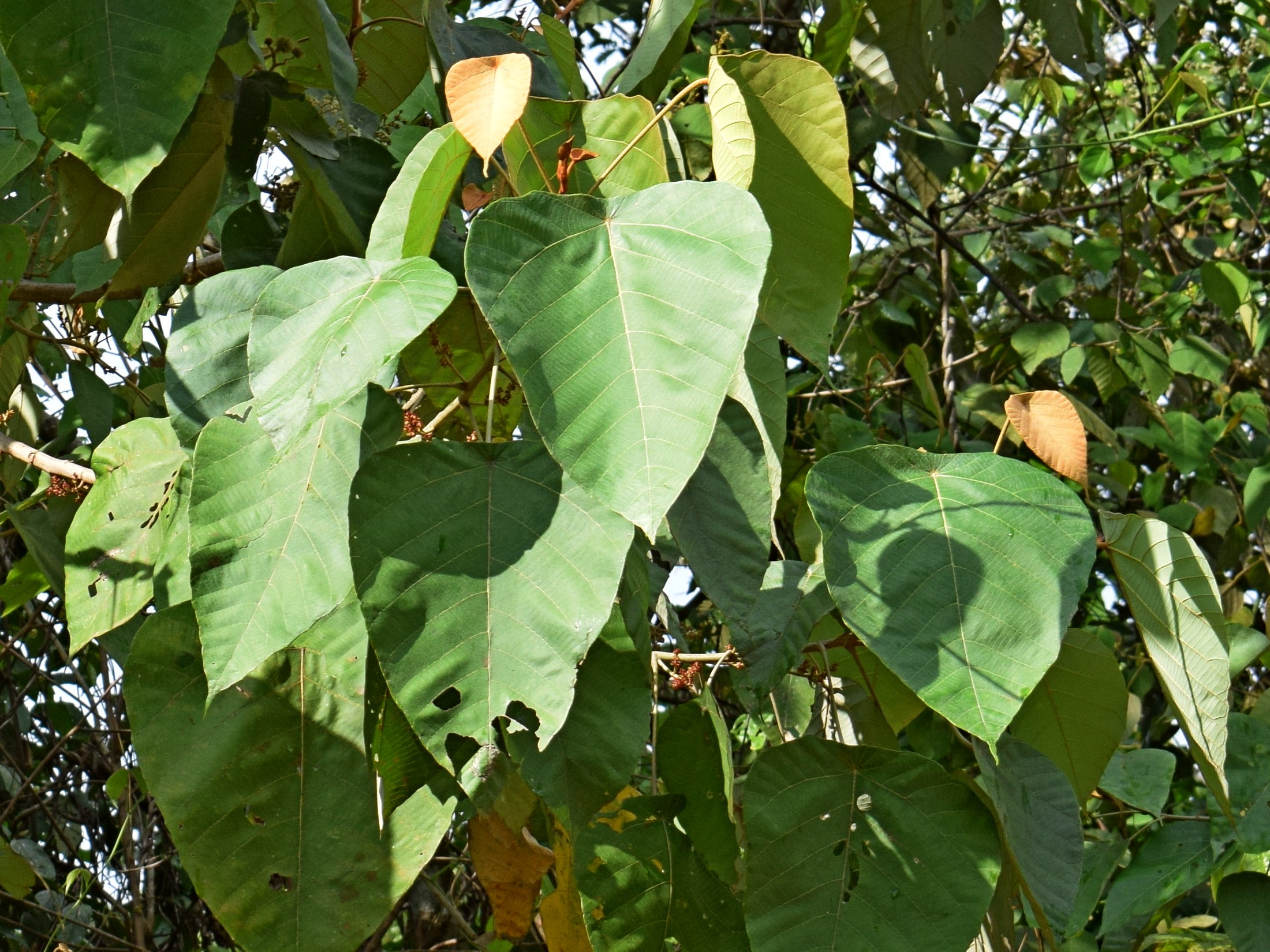

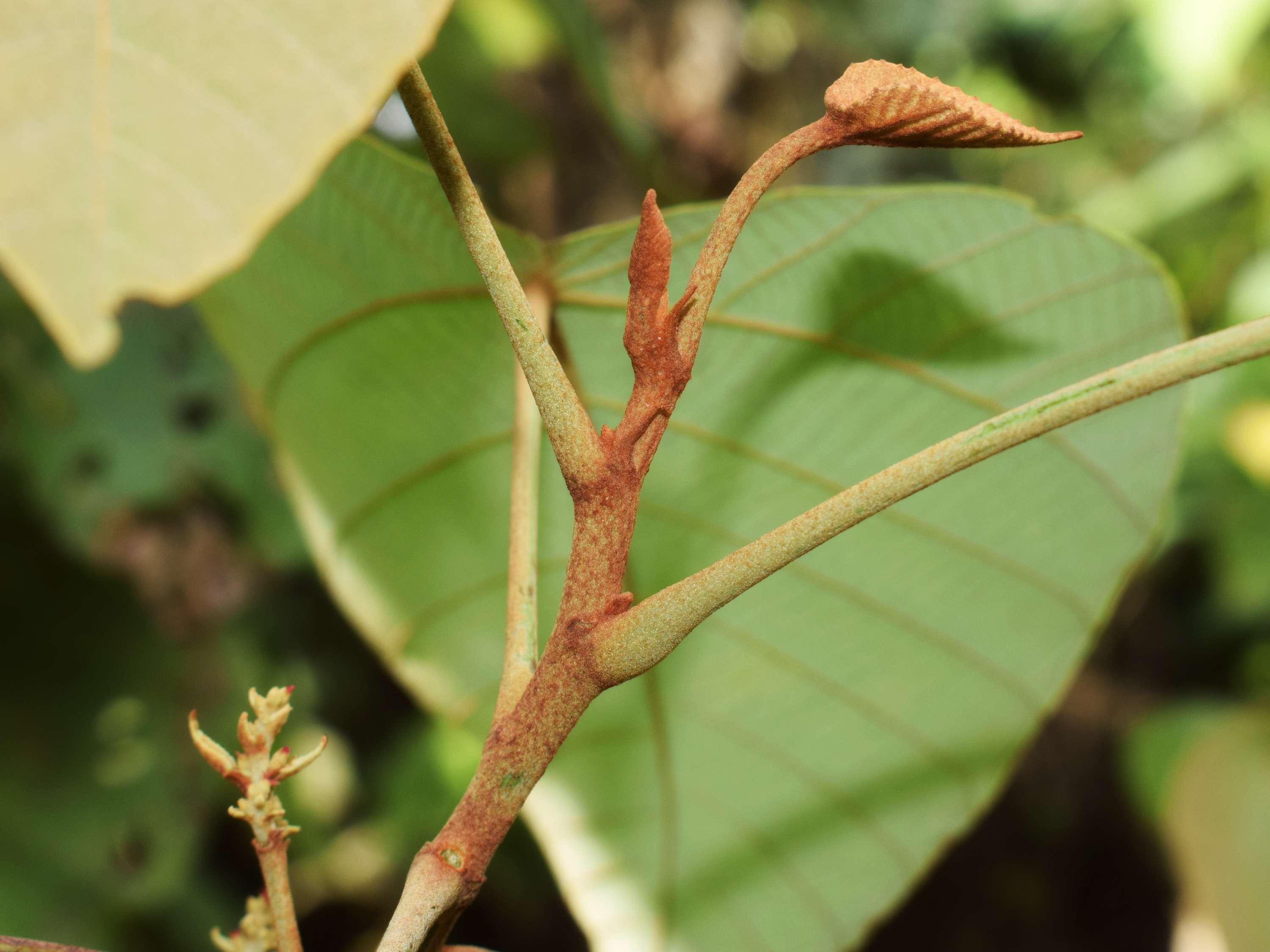

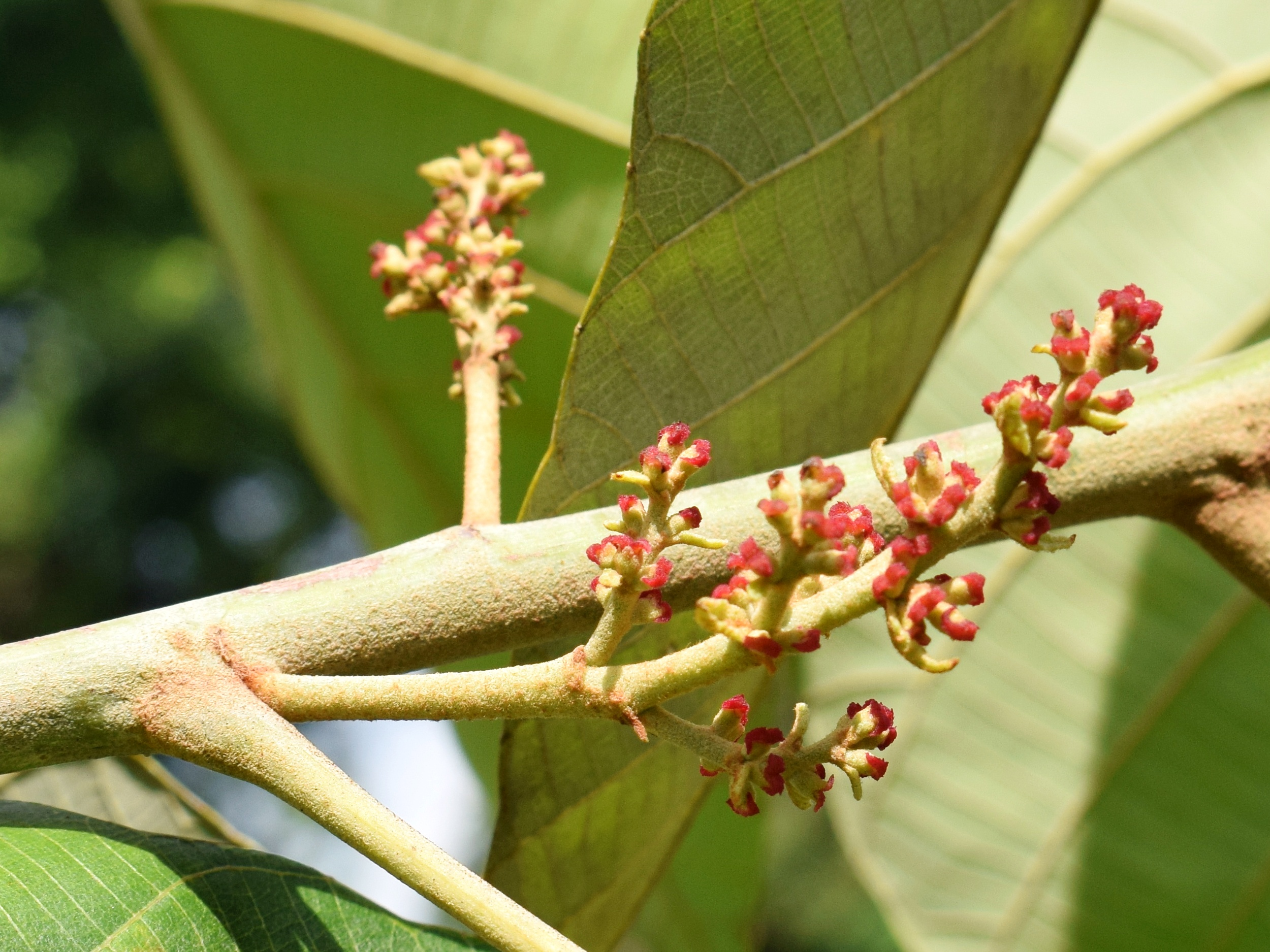
