= Macaranga conglomerata =

Conservation status
- Vulnerable (IUCN 3.1)

Scientific classification
- Kingdom: Plantae
- Clade: Tracheophytes
- Clade: Angiosperms
- Clade: Eudicots
- Clade: Rosids
- Order: Malpighiales
- Family: Euphorbiaceae
- Genus: Macaranga
- Species: M. conglomerata

Binomial name
- Macaranga conglomerata Brenan

Species of flowering plant

Macaranga conglomerata is a species of plant in the family Euphorbiaceae. It is found in Kenya and Tanzania. It is threatened by habitat loss.
