= Macaranga venosa =

Conservation status
- Least Concern (IUCN 3.1)

Scientific classification
- Kingdom: Plantae
- Clade: Embryophytes
- Clade: Tracheophytes
- Clade: Angiosperms
- Clade: Eudicots
- Clade: Rosids
- Order: Malpighiales
- Family: Euphorbiaceae
- Genus: Macaranga
- Species: M. venosa

Binomial name
- Macaranga venosa J.W.Moore (1963)

Species of flowering plant

Macaranga venosa is a species of flowering plant in the family Euphorbiaceae. It is a shrub or tree endemic to the Society Islands of French Polynesia, where it grows on the islands of Raiatea, Tahaa, and Tahiti.
