= Macaranga paxii =

Conservation status
- Vulnerable (IUCN 2.3)

Scientific classification
- Kingdom: Plantae
- Clade: Tracheophytes
- Clade: Angiosperms
- Clade: Eudicots
- Clade: Rosids
- Order: Malpighiales
- Family: Euphorbiaceae
- Genus: Macaranga
- Species: M. paxii

Binomial name
- Macaranga paxii Prain

Species of flowering plant

Macaranga paxii is a species of plant in the family Euphorbiaceae. It is found in Cameroon and Nigeria. It is threatened by habitat loss.
