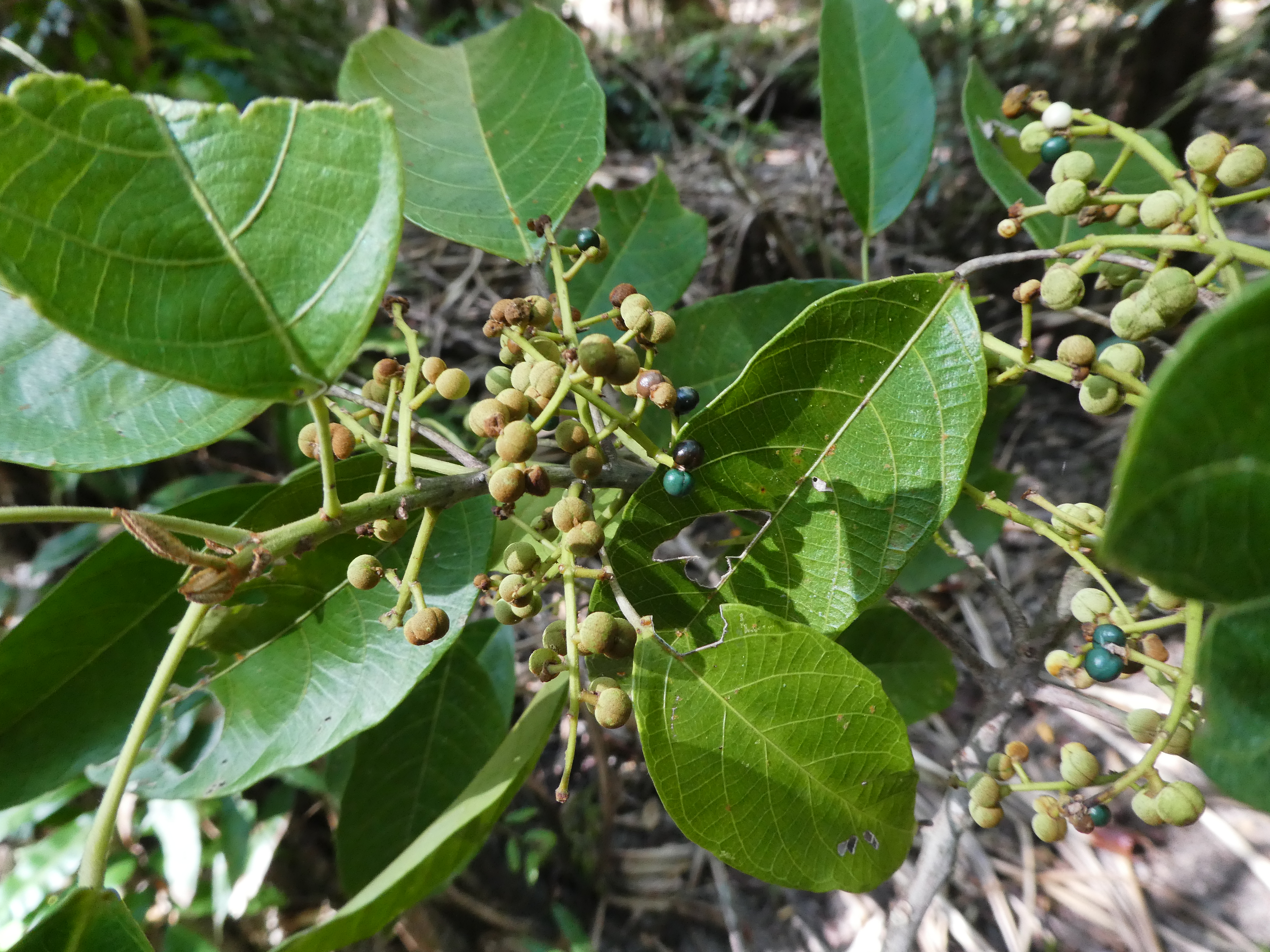
- Foliage and fruit

Conservation status
- Least Concern (IUCN 3.1)

Scientific classification
- Kingdom: Plantae
- Clade: Tracheophytes
- Clade: Angiosperms
- Clade: Eudicots
- Clade: Rosids
- Order: Malpighiales
- Family: Euphorbiaceae
- Genus: Macaranga
- Species: M. polyadenia

Binomial name
- Macaranga polyadenia Pax & K.Hoffm.

Synonyms
- Macaranga fimbriata S.Moore; Macaranga fimbriata var. doctersii L.M.Perry; Macaranga multiflora C.T.White

= Macaranga polyadenia =

Species of flowering plant

Macaranga polyadenia is a small tree up to 10 m (33 ft) tall in the family Euphorbiaceae, found in New Guinea, the Bismarck Archipelago, the Solomon Islands, Vanuatu and the Australian state of Queensland. It usually inhabits lowland palm forest and seasonally flooded swamp forest, but may occur up to 500 m (1,600 ft) above sea level. It was first described in 1919 by botanists Ferdinand Albin Pax and Käthe Hoffmann.

== Conservation ==
As of November 2024, this species has been assessed to be of least concern by the International Union for Conservation of Nature (IUCN) and by the Queensland Government under its Nature Conservation Act.
