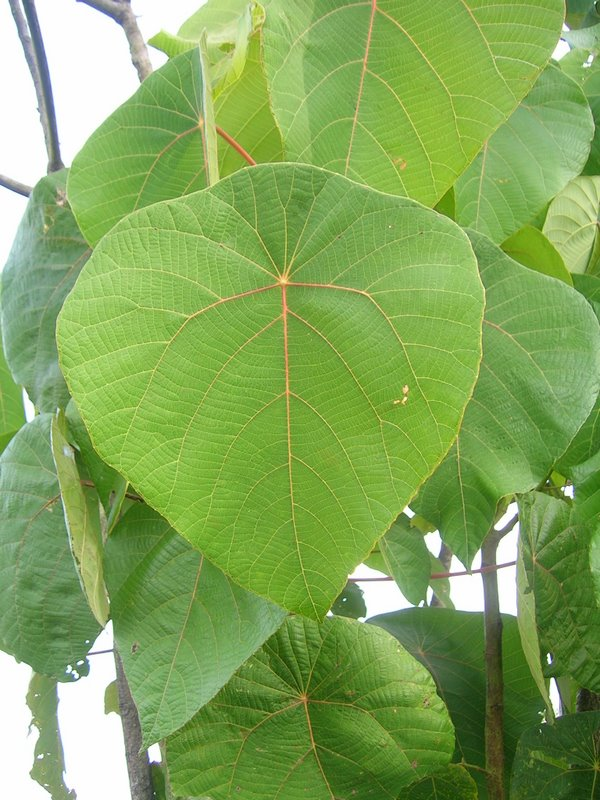

Scientific classification
- Kingdom: Plantae
- Clade: Tracheophytes
- Clade: Angiosperms
- Clade: Eudicots
- Clade: Rosids
- Order: Malpighiales
- Family: Euphorbiaceae
- Genus: Macaranga
- Species: M. peltata

Binomial name
- Macaranga peltata Roxb. Mueller

Synonyms
- Macaranga roxburghii; Tanarius peltatus; Mappa peltata

= Macaranga peltata =

Species of pioneer tree from Asia

Macaranga peltata is a plant found in northern Thailand, Sri Lanka and India. It is one of the most widely occurring early successional woody species in Sri Lanka, specially in low country wet zone. Some of the many common names include kenda - කැන්ද or kanda in Sri Lanka and chandada in India.

== Description ==
It is a resinous tree, up to 10 metres (33 ft) tall. Young parts are velvet hairy. Leaves measure 20 to 50 centimetres (7.9 to 19.7 in) by 12 to 21 centimetres (4.7 to 8.3 in), are alternately arranged, circular or broadly ovate, entire or minutely dentate, and palmately 9-nerved. The leaf stalk is attached on the lower surface of the leaf, not on the base.

Yellow-green flowers occur in long panicles in leaf axils in the months of January to February. Male flowers are minute, numerous, and clustered in the axils of large bracts. One round, black seed is in a spherical capsule 4 to 5 mm across.

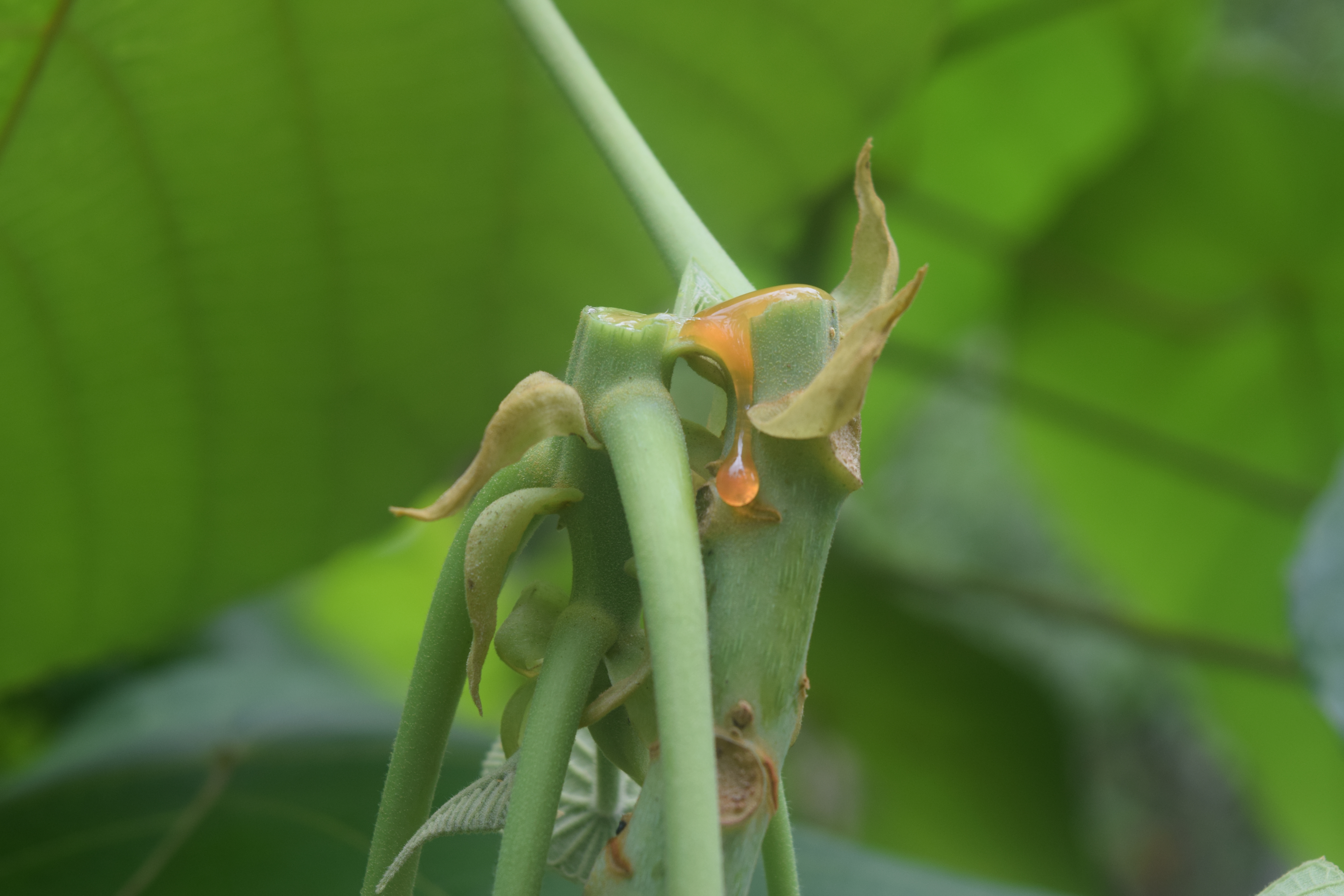
Exudates resinous from cut ends

== Ecology ==
Mallotus tetracoccus is a pioneer or early-successional or early-secondary tree species more common in forest edges, clearings, and secondary forests than in mature forest interiors. Ecophysiological studies indicate that Macaranga peltata shows a combination of high quantum use efficiency of photosynthetic system (Fv/Fm) and relative growth rates under higher light conditions, similar in pattern to other pioneer species such as Mallotus tetracoccus.

== Uses ==
Kenda leaves are commonly used for flavoring in Sri Lanka. Halapa dough is often flattened on a kenda leaf to soak in the flavor. Kenda leaves are used to wrap jaggery and other sweetmeats.In coastal regions of Indian state Kerala, these leaves are used by local fish vendors for wrapping the fish.

Today the major use of Macranga peltata is for making wooden pencils and in the plywood industry. Kollam produces 75 to 100 truck loads of pencil slats.
