= Macaranga mauritiana =

Conservation status
- Endangered (IUCN 2.3)

Scientific classification
- Kingdom: Plantae
- Clade: Embryophytes
- Clade: Tracheophytes
- Clade: Angiosperms
- Clade: Eudicots
- Clade: Rosids
- Order: Malpighiales
- Family: Euphorbiaceae
- Genus: Macaranga
- Species: M. mauritiana

Binomial name
- Macaranga mauritiana Bojer ex Baill.

Synonyms
- Tanarius mauritianus (Bojer ex Baill.) Kuntze

Species of flowering plant

Macaranga mauritiana is a species of plant in the family Euphorbiaceae. It is endemic to Mauritius.
