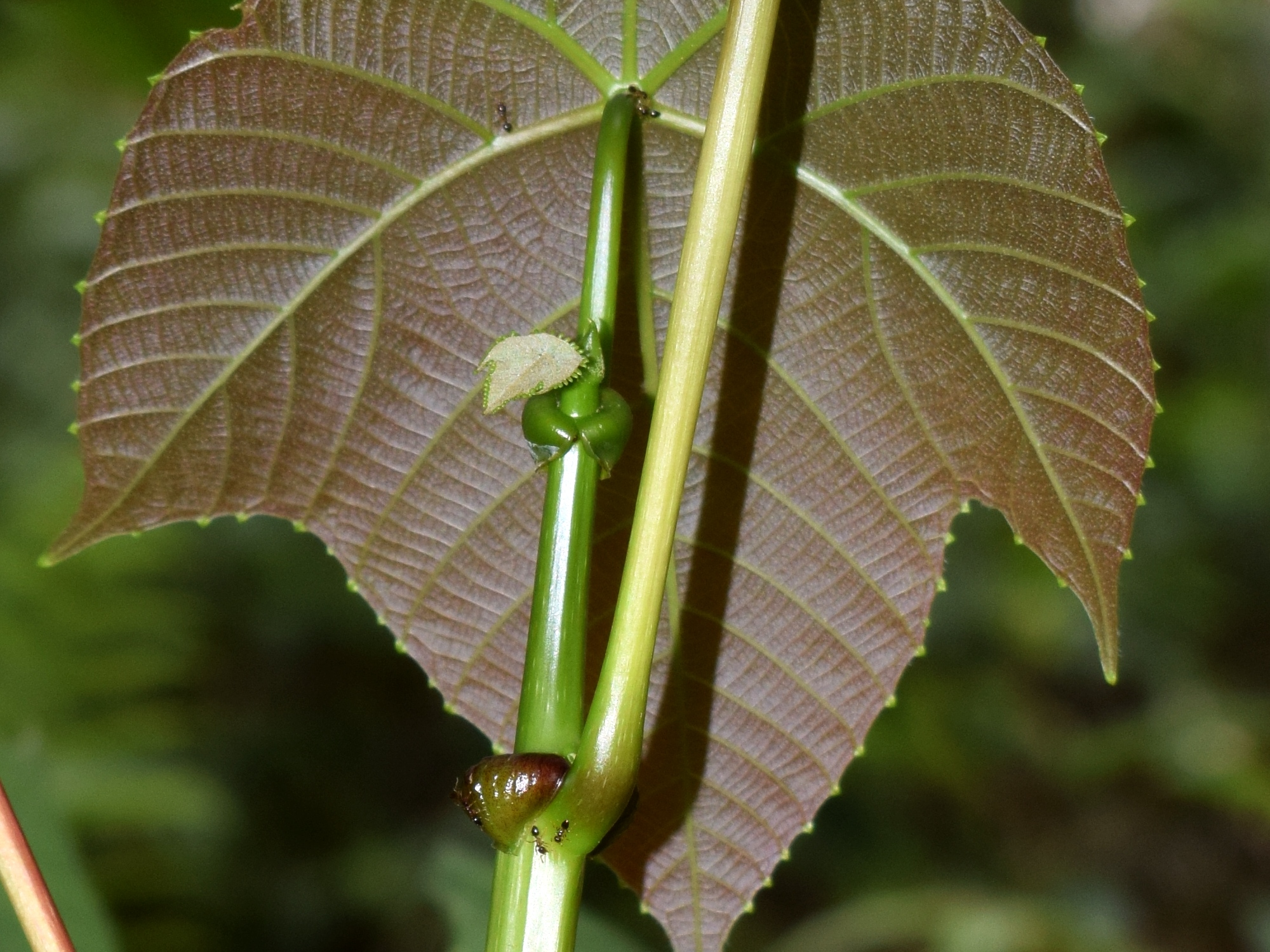

Conservation status
- Least Concern (IUCN 3.1)

Scientific classification
- Kingdom: Plantae
- Clade: Tracheophytes
- Clade: Angiosperms
- Clade: Eudicots
- Clade: Rosids
- Order: Malpighiales
- Family: Euphorbiaceae
- Genus: Macaranga
- Species: M. bancana

Binomial name
- Macaranga bancana (Miq.) Müll.Arg.

Synonyms
- Pachystemon bancanus; Tanarius bancanus; Macaranga tenuifolia; Tanarius tenuifolius

= Macaranga bancana =

Species of tree

Macaranga bancana is a tree in the Euphorbiaceae family native to Borneo, Peninsular Malaysia, Sumatra, and Thailand. It has the common name common mahang, and is considered a successful pioneer species.

== Etymology ==
The common mahang's specific name bancana is Latin for "from Bangka", alluding to its type locality.

== Description ==
Macaranga bancana is a small tree. Its leaves are tri-lobed, and have palmate venation. The leaf stalks are connected to the center of each leaf rather than to the edge.

== Distribution and habitat ==
Macaranga bancana is commonly found in southeast Asia, particularly in Malaysia.
