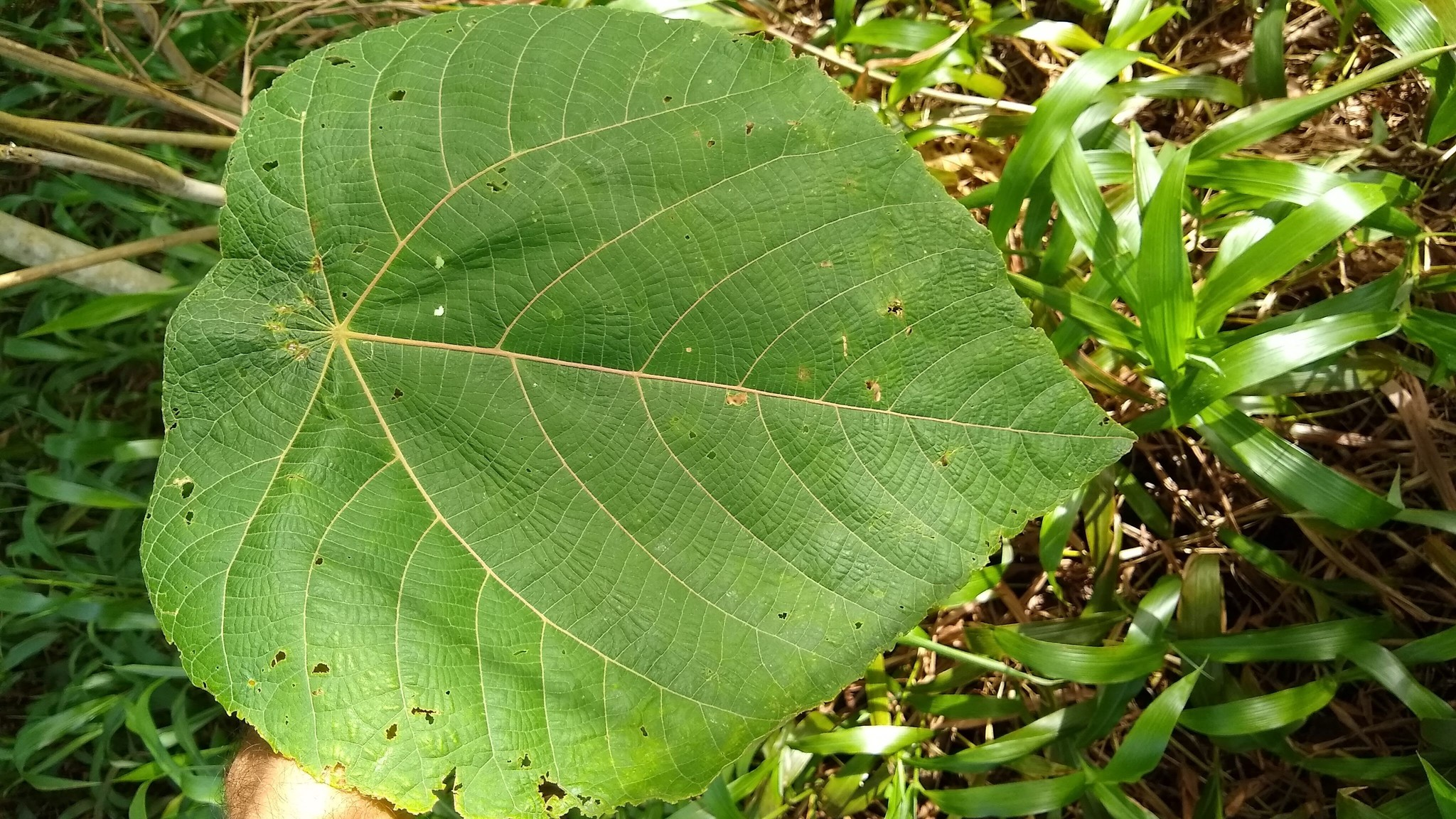

Scientific classification
- Kingdom: Plantae
- Clade: Tracheophytes
- Clade: Angiosperms
- Clade: Eudicots
- Clade: Rosids
- Order: Malpighiales
- Family: Euphorbiaceae
- Genus: Macaranga
- Species: M. carolinensis

Binomial name
- Macaranga carolinensis Volkens

= Macaranga carolinensis =

Species of flowering plant

Macaranga carolinensis is a species of flowering plant in the family Euphorbiaceae, native to Sulawesi, the Caroline Islands and the Gilbert Islands.
