= Macaranga taitensis =

Conservation status
- Least Concern (IUCN 3.1)

Scientific classification
- Kingdom: Plantae
- Clade: Embryophytes
- Clade: Tracheophytes
- Clade: Angiosperms
- Clade: Eudicots
- Clade: Rosids
- Order: Malpighiales
- Family: Euphorbiaceae
- Genus: Macaranga
- Species: M. taitensis

Binomial name
- Macaranga taitensis (Müll.Arg.) Müll.Arg. (1866)

Synonyms
- Mappa taitensis Müll.Arg. (1865); Tanarius taitensis (Müll.Arg.) Kuntze (1891)

Species of flowering plant

Macaranga taitensis is a species of flowering plant in the family Euphorbiaceae. It is a shrub or tree endemic to the island of Tahiti, in the Society Islands of French Polynesia.
