= Macaranga raivavaeensis =

Conservation status
- Critically Endangered (IUCN 3.1)

Scientific classification
- Kingdom: Plantae
- Clade: Tracheophytes
- Clade: Angiosperms
- Clade: Eudicots
- Clade: Rosids
- Order: Malpighiales
- Family: Euphorbiaceae
- Genus: Macaranga
- Species: M. raivavaeensis

Binomial name
- Macaranga raivavaeensis H.St.John (1983)

Species of flowering plant

Macaranga raivavaeensis is a species of flowering plant in the family Euphorbiaceae. It is a tree endemic the islands of Raivavae and Rimatara in the Tubuai Islands of French Polynesia.
