= Macaranga beillei =

Conservation status
- Vulnerable (IUCN 2.3)

Scientific classification
- Kingdom: Plantae
- Clade: Tracheophytes
- Clade: Angiosperms
- Clade: Eudicots
- Clade: Rosids
- Order: Malpighiales
- Family: Euphorbiaceae
- Genus: Macaranga
- Species: M. beillei

Binomial name
- Macaranga beillei Prain

Species of tree

Macaranga beillei is a large shrub or small tree in the family Euphorbiaceae. It is endemic to Ivory Coast.
