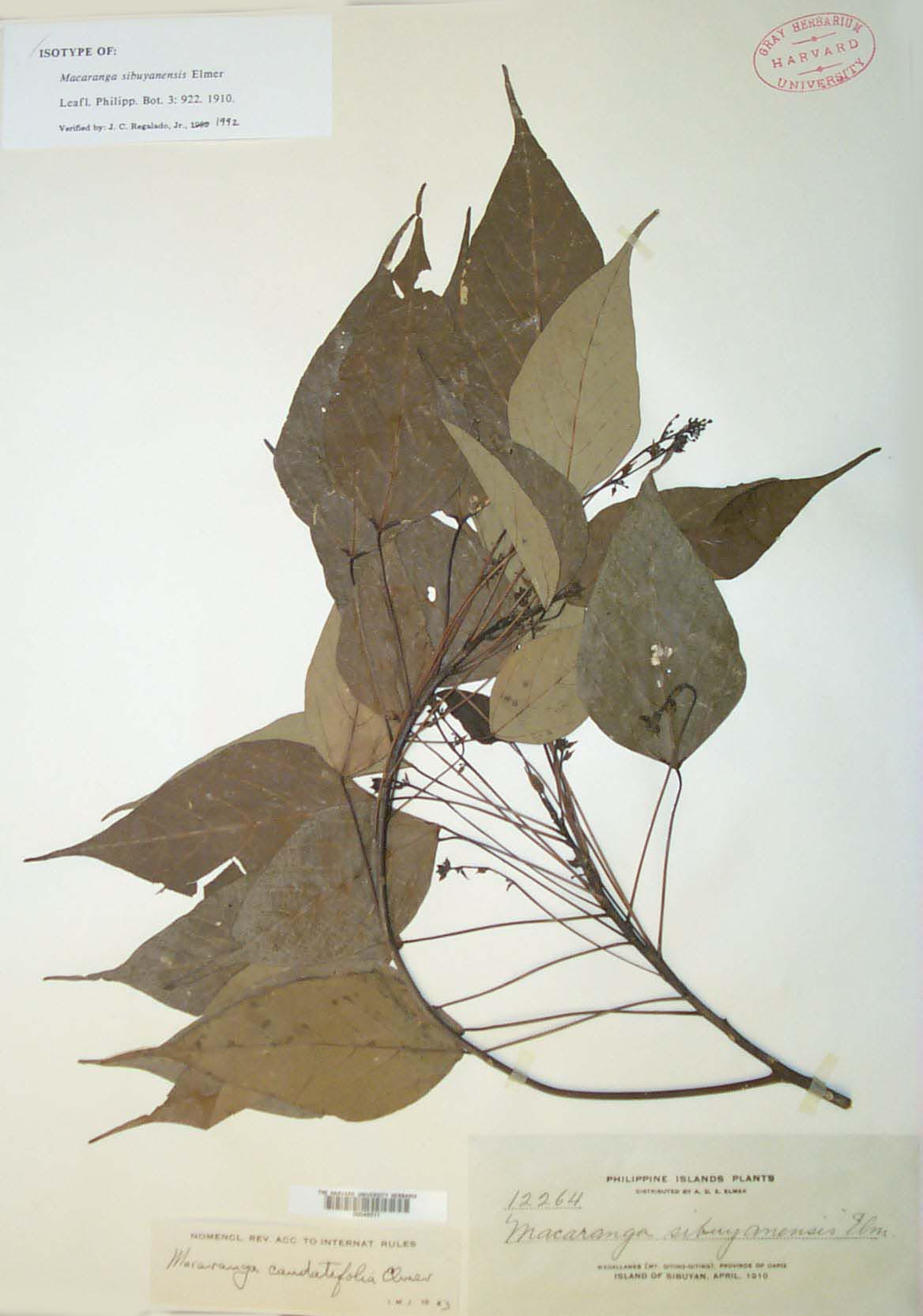
- Macaranga caudatifolia

Conservation status
- Vulnerable (IUCN 2.3)

Scientific classification
- Kingdom: Plantae
- Clade: Tracheophytes
- Clade: Angiosperms
- Clade: Eudicots
- Clade: Rosids
- Order: Malpighiales
- Family: Euphorbiaceae
- Genus: Macaranga
- Species: M. caudatifolia

Binomial name
- Macaranga caudatifolia Elmer

Synonyms
- Macaranga apoensis Elmer; Macaranga cuneata Elmer; Macaranga sibuyanensis Elmer

= Macaranga caudatifolia =

Species of flowering plant

Macaranga caudatifolia is a species of plant in the family Euphorbiaceae. It is endemic to the Philippines.
