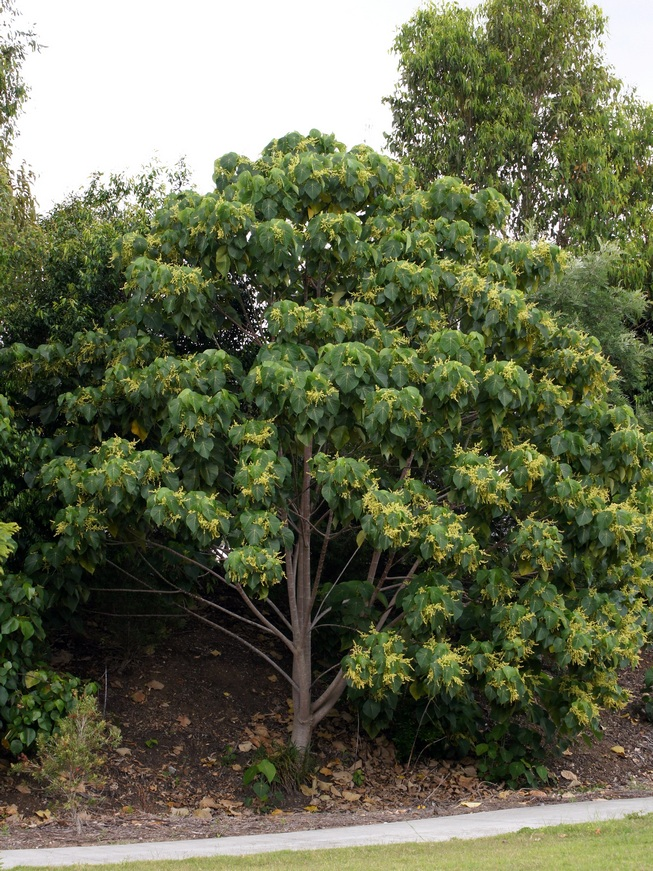
- Macaranga tanarius - leaves

Scientific classification
- Kingdom: Plantae
- Clade: Embryophytes
- Clade: Tracheophytes
- Clade: Angiosperms
- Clade: Eudicots
- Clade: Rosids
- Order: Malpighiales
- Family: Euphorbiaceae
- Genus: Macaranga
- Species: M. tanarius

Binomial name
- Macaranga tanarius (L.) Müll.Arg., 1866

Synonyms
- Ricinus tanarius L.

= Macaranga tanarius =

Pioneer rainforest tree species

Macaranga tanarius is a species of flowering plant found in South East Asia, Thailand, Papua New Guinea, South China, Taiwan, and eastern Australia. It is commonly seen as a pioneer species in disturbed rainforest areas. It is easily recognised for its round veiny leaves. In Australia, it naturally occurs from the Richmond River, New South Wales to Cooktown in tropical Queensland.

Some of the many common names include parasol leaf tree, blush macaranga, nasturtium tree, David's heart and heart leaf.

== Description ==
It is a shrub or bushy tree, sometimes reaching 12 metres tall and with a stem diameter of 40 cm. The trunk is short and crooked, bark being grey-brown, with bumps and irregularities. The branchlets are smooth, bluish grey with prominent leaf scars.

Leaves are alternate, and round with a tip, 8 to 23 cm long, greyish or white on the underside. It has prominent leaf stalks 8 to 20 cm long which connect within the leaf itself. Nine main veins radiate from the leaf stalk, easily noticed on the upper and lower leaf side.

Yellow-green flowers form on panicles in the months of October to January (in New South Wales). Female and male flowers grow on different trees. The fruit is a prickly three-celled yellow capsule, 9 mm in diameter, maturing in January to February (in New South Wales). There is one black seed in each of the cells. Germination from fresh seed occurs without difficulty. Cuttings strike well.

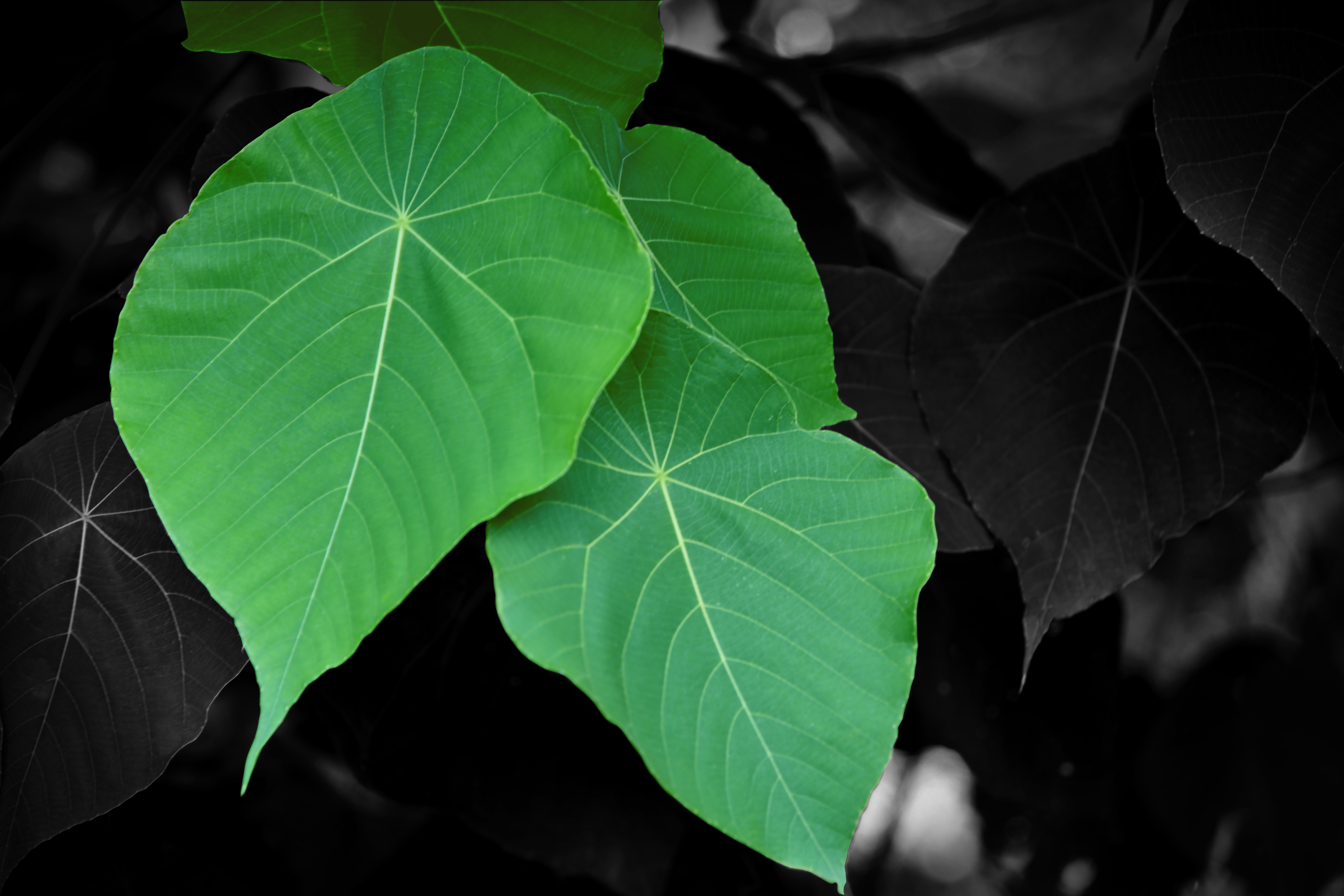

== Uses ==
Macaranga tanarius has been considered to be an attractive ornamental tree due to its unique leaves. It is also popular with bush regenerators, as it can provide shade for juvenile trees.

Its bark contains tannins that are used as a colorant: it is used to dye nets, mats, as a kind of house paint, or as a leather preservative in tanning.

In the Philippines, particularly in the Ilocos Region and Apayao, the tree locally known as samak is widely used in producing traditional basi (a sugarcane-based rum) and local vinegar. Various parts of the tree, including its dried leaves, bark, fruits, and flowers, are used as fermenting, coloring, and flavoring agents during the fermentation process.

== Gallery ==
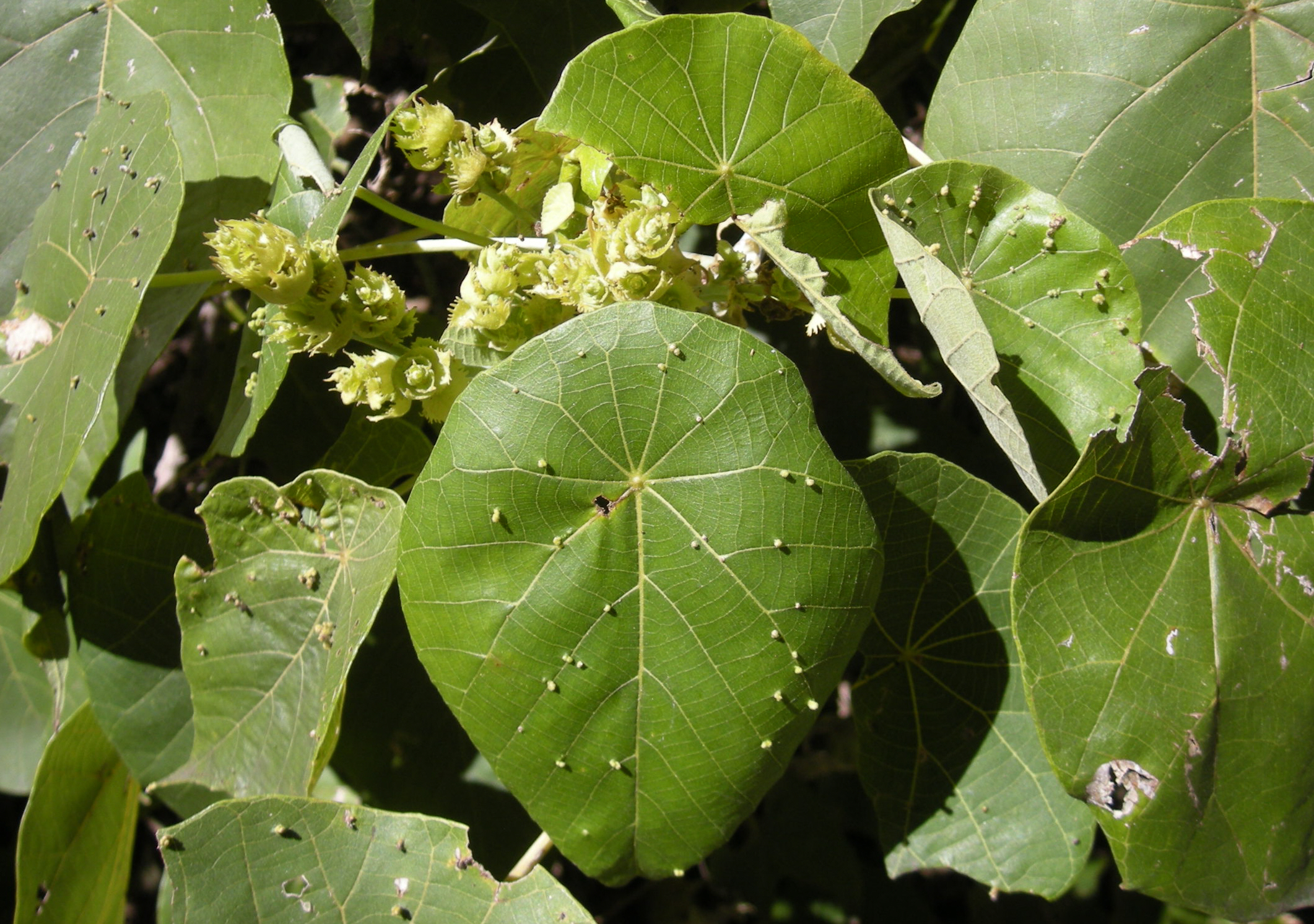
Macaranga tanarius - foliage and flowers.

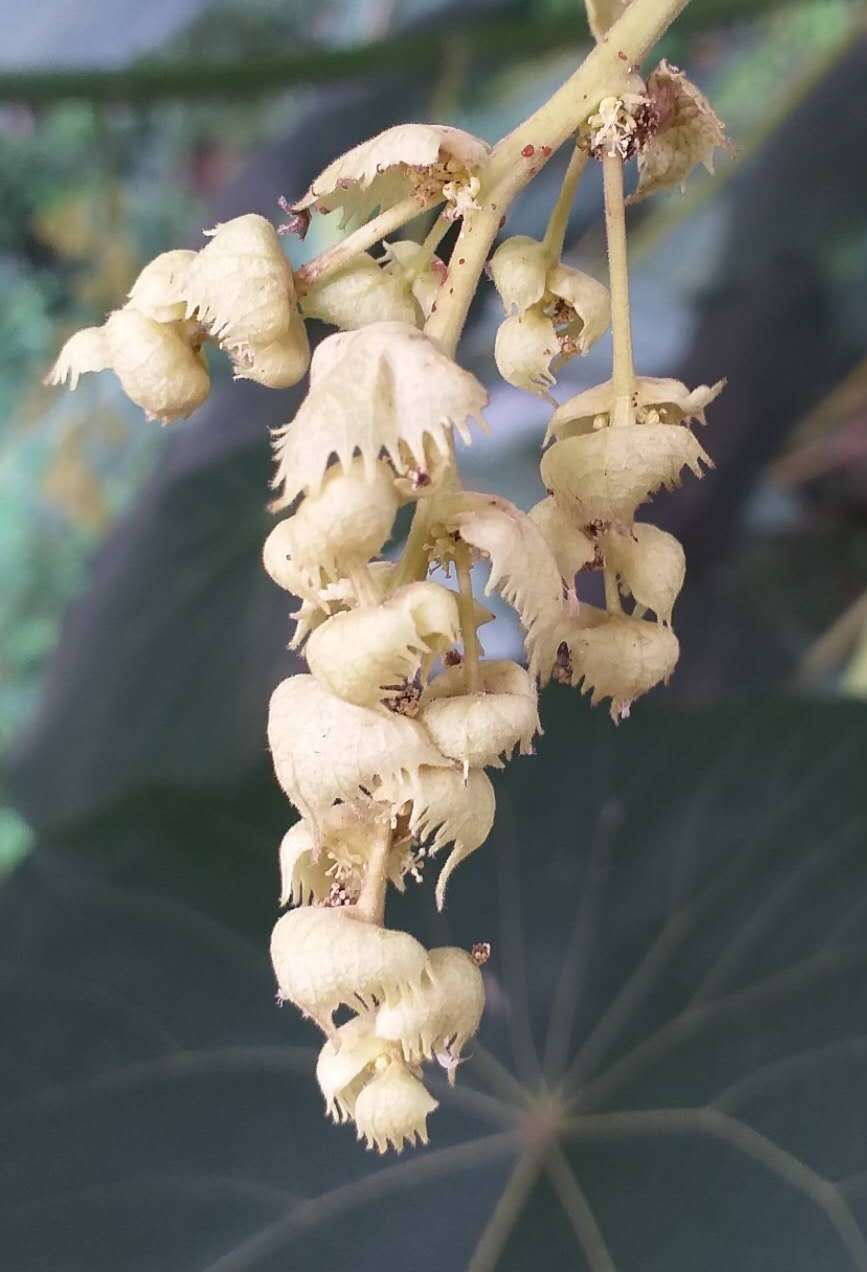
Bract.The flower of Macaranga tanarius has no petals.
