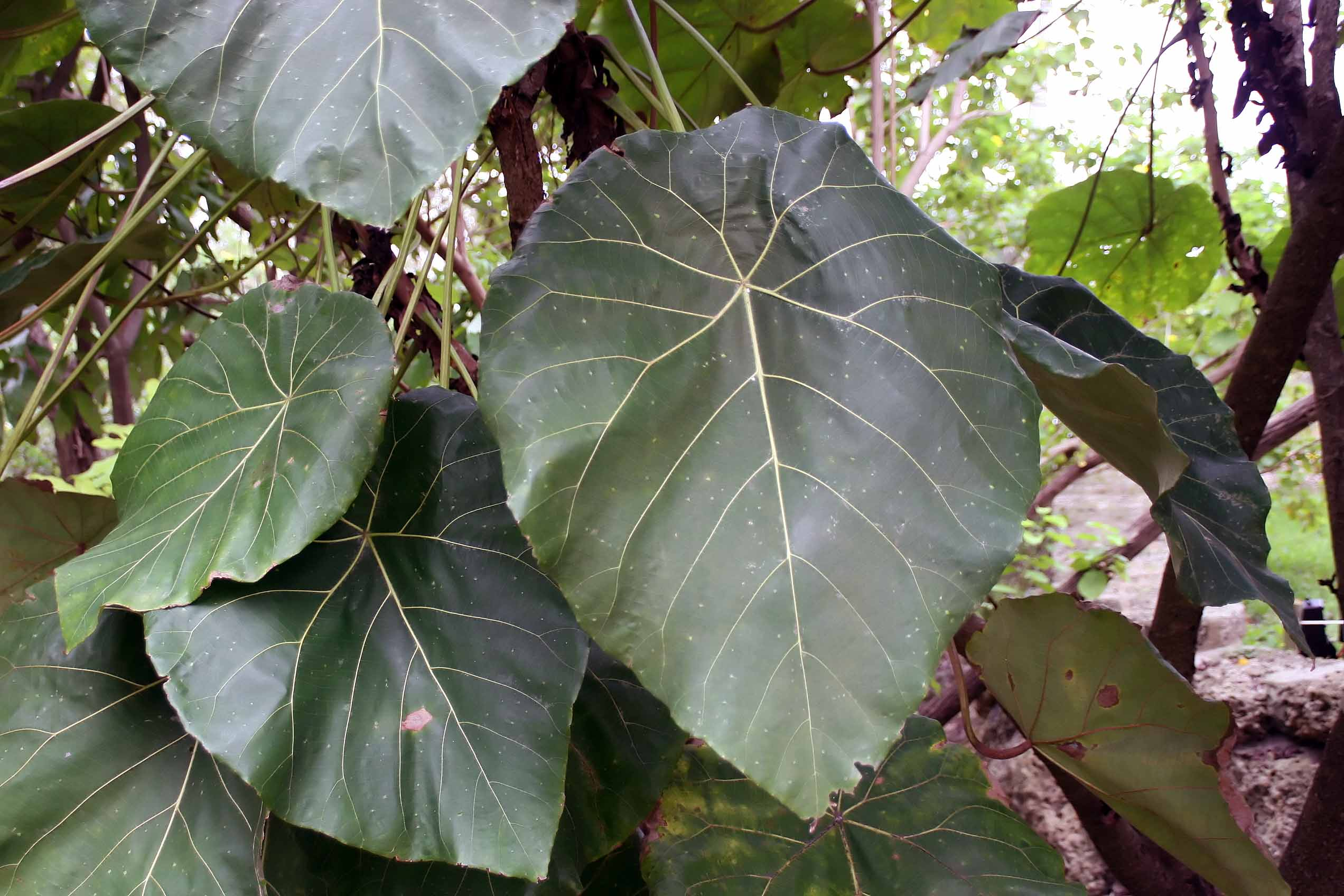

Conservation status
- Vulnerable (IUCN 2.3)

Scientific classification
- Kingdom: Plantae
- Clade: Embryophytes
- Clade: Tracheophytes
- Clade: Angiosperms
- Clade: Eudicots
- Clade: Rosids
- Order: Malpighiales
- Family: Euphorbiaceae
- Genus: Macaranga
- Species: M. grandifolia

Binomial name
- Macaranga grandifolia (Blanco) Merr.

Synonyms
- Croton grandifolius Blanco; Macaranga porteana André

= Macaranga grandifolia =

Species of flowering plant

Macaranga grandifolia is a species of flowering plant in the family Euphorbiaceae. Common names for this plant include nasturtium tree, parasol leaf tree and bingabing. It is endemic to the Philippines and has been widely cultivated in Hawaii as a tropical ornamental. This plant has become a very popular garden ornamental in many parts of the tropics for its extraordinarily grandiose leaves, which are rounded-ovate in shape, with prominent reddish veins, and the stem attached towards the center of the leaf blade. The flowers are pinkish red, and the males are held in coral-like, congested inflorescences. Twine made from the bark and the wood was used for fishing spears. The leaves were used to wrap food. Birds eat the ripe fruit.
