= Malaccensis =

Malaccensis may refer to:

== Plants ==
- Actinodaphne malaccensis, a species of tree in the family Lauraceae native to Malaysia and Singapore
- Aglaia malaccensis, a species of plant in the family Meliaceae found in Southeast Asia
- Alpinia malaccensis, a plant in the family Zingiberaceae native to Indonesia and Malaysia
- Aquilaria malaccensis, a species of tree in the family Thymelaeaceae found in Southeast Asia
- Koompassia malaccensis, a tropical rainforest tree species in the family Fabaceae found in Southeast Asia
- Lasiococca malaccensis, a synonym of Lasiococca brevipes, a tree species found in Southeast Asia
- Lindera malaccensis, a synonym for Lindera lucida, a plant species found in Malaysia
- Madhuca malaccensis, a tree in the family Sapotaceae found in Southeast Asia
- Planchonella malaccensis, a tree in the family Sapotaceae found in Southeast Asia

== Beetle species in the family Cerambycidae ==
- Acalolepta malaccensis
- Blepephaeus malaccensis
- Cylindrepomus malaccensis
- Falsoparmena malaccensis
- Gyaritus malaccensis
- Pothyne malaccensis
- Sybra malaccensis
