= L. malaccensis =

L. malaccensis may refer to:

- Lasiococca malaccensis, a synonym of Lasiococca brevipes, a tree species found in Southeast Asia
- Lindera malaccensis, a synonym for Lindera lucida, a plant species found in Malaysia

== See also ==
- Malaccensis (disambiguation)
