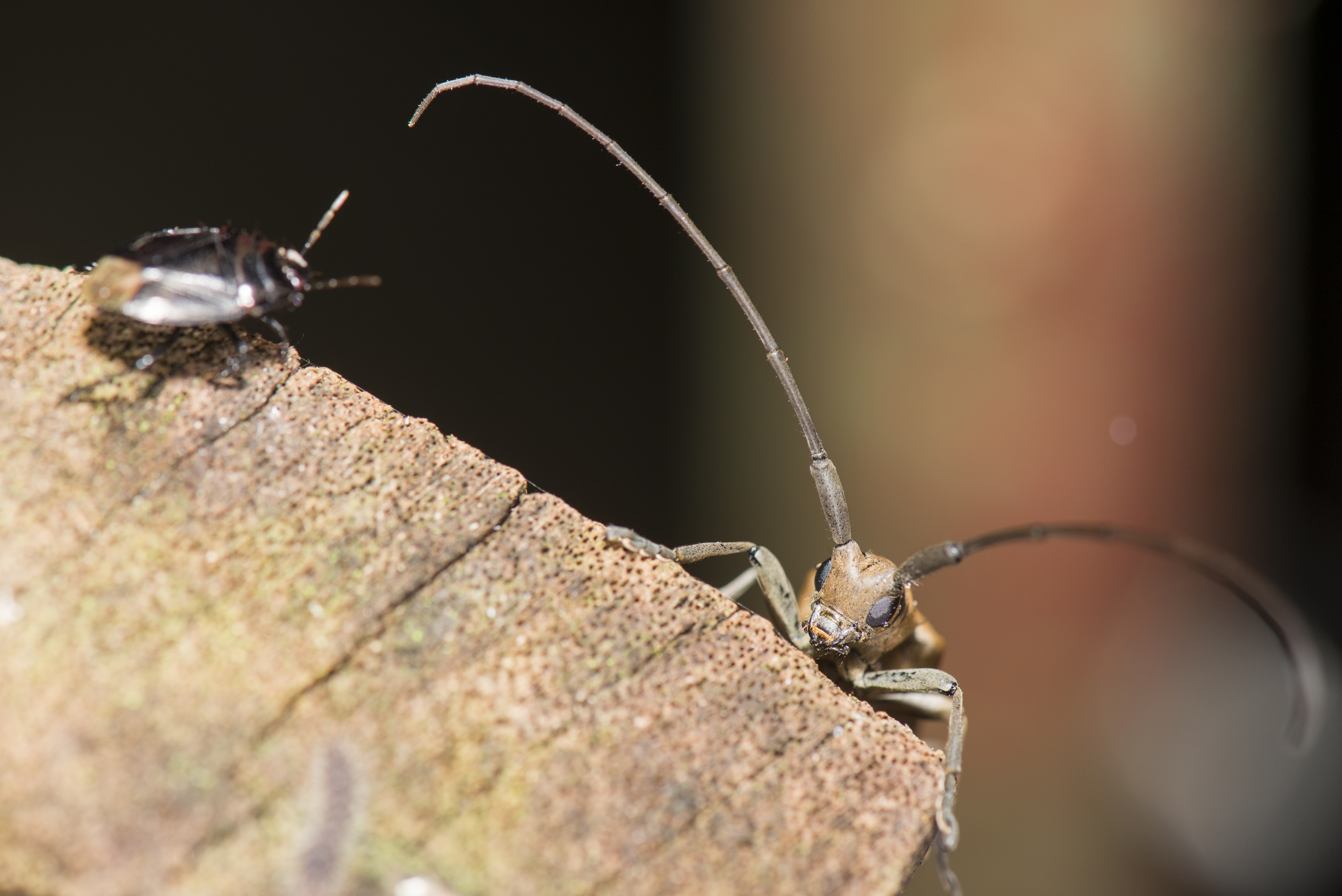

Scientific classification
- Kingdom: Animalia
- Phylum: Arthropoda
- Class: Insecta
- Order: Coleoptera
- Suborder: Polyphaga
- Infraorder: Cucujiformia
- Family: Cerambycidae
- Genus: Peblephaeus
- Species: P. decoloratus

Binomial name
- Peblephaeus decoloratus (Schwarzer, 1925)

Synonyms
- Blepephaeus decoloratus Schwarzer, 1925

= Peblephaeus decoloratus =

Species of beetle

Peblephaeus decoloratus is a species of beetle in the family Cerambycidae. It was described by Bernhard Schwarzer in 1925, originally under the genus Blepephaeus.

== Subspecies ==
- Peblephaeus decoloratus decoloratus (Schwarzer, 1925)
- Peblephaeus decoloratus yonagunii (Breuning & Ohbayashi, 1966)
