= Peblephaeus yayeyamai =

Scientific classification
- Kingdom: Animalia
- Phylum: Arthropoda
- Class: Insecta
- Order: Coleoptera
- Suborder: Polyphaga
- Infraorder: Cucujiformia
- Family: Cerambycidae
- Genus: Peblephaeus
- Species: P. yayeyamai

Binomial name
- Peblephaeus yayeyamai (Breuning, 1955)

Synonyms
- Blepephaeus yayeyamai Breuning, 1955

Species of beetle

Peblephaeus yayeyamai is a species of beetle in the family Cerambycidae. It was described by Stephan von Breuning in 1955, originally under the genus Blepephaeus.

== Subspecies ==
- Peblephaeus yayeyamai caesius Takakuwa, 1984
- Peblephaeus yayeyamai yayeyamai (Breuning, 1955)
