= Peblephaeus nobuoi =

Scientific classification
- Kingdom: Animalia
- Phylum: Arthropoda
- Class: Insecta
- Order: Coleoptera
- Suborder: Polyphaga
- Infraorder: Cucujiformia
- Family: Cerambycidae
- Genus: Peblephaeus
- Species: P. nobuoi

Binomial name
- Peblephaeus nobuoi (Breuning & Ohbayashi, 1966)

Synonyms
- Blepephaeus nobuoi Breuning & Ohbayashi, 1966

Species of beetle

Peblephaeus nobuoi is a species of beetle in the family Cerambycidae. It was described by Stephan von Breuning and Nobuo Ohbayashi in 1966, originally under the genus Blepephaeus. It is found in Japan.
