= Pothyne biguttula =

Scientific classification
- Kingdom: Animalia
- Phylum: Arthropoda
- Class: Insecta
- Order: Coleoptera
- Suborder: Polyphaga
- Infraorder: Cucujiformia
- Family: Cerambycidae
- Genus: Pothyne
- Species: P. biguttula

Binomial name
- Pothyne biguttula Schwarzer, 1929

Species of beetle

Pothyne biguttula is a species of beetle in the family Cerambycidae. It was described by Schwarzer in 1929.
