= Blepephaeus nigrofasciatus =

Scientific classification
- Domain: Eukaryota
- Kingdom: Animalia
- Phylum: Arthropoda
- Class: Insecta
- Order: Coleoptera
- Suborder: Polyphaga
- Infraorder: Cucujiformia
- Family: Cerambycidae
- Tribe: Lamiini
- Genus: Blepephaeus
- Species: B. nigrofasciatus

Binomial name
- Blepephaeus nigrofasciatus Pu, 1999

Species of beetle

Blepephaeus nigrofasciatus is a species of beetle in the family Cerambycidae. It was described by Pu in 1999. It is known from China.
