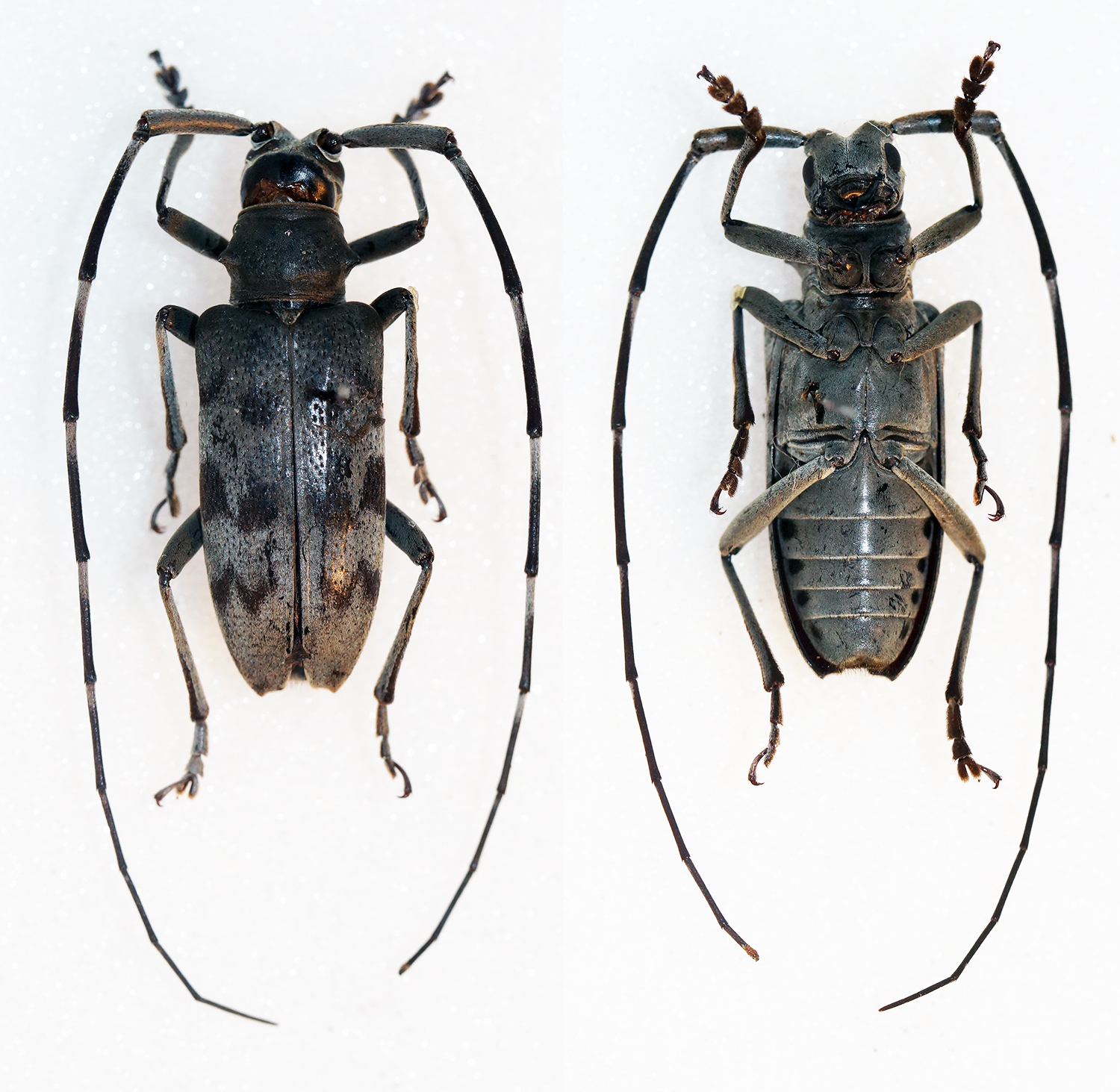

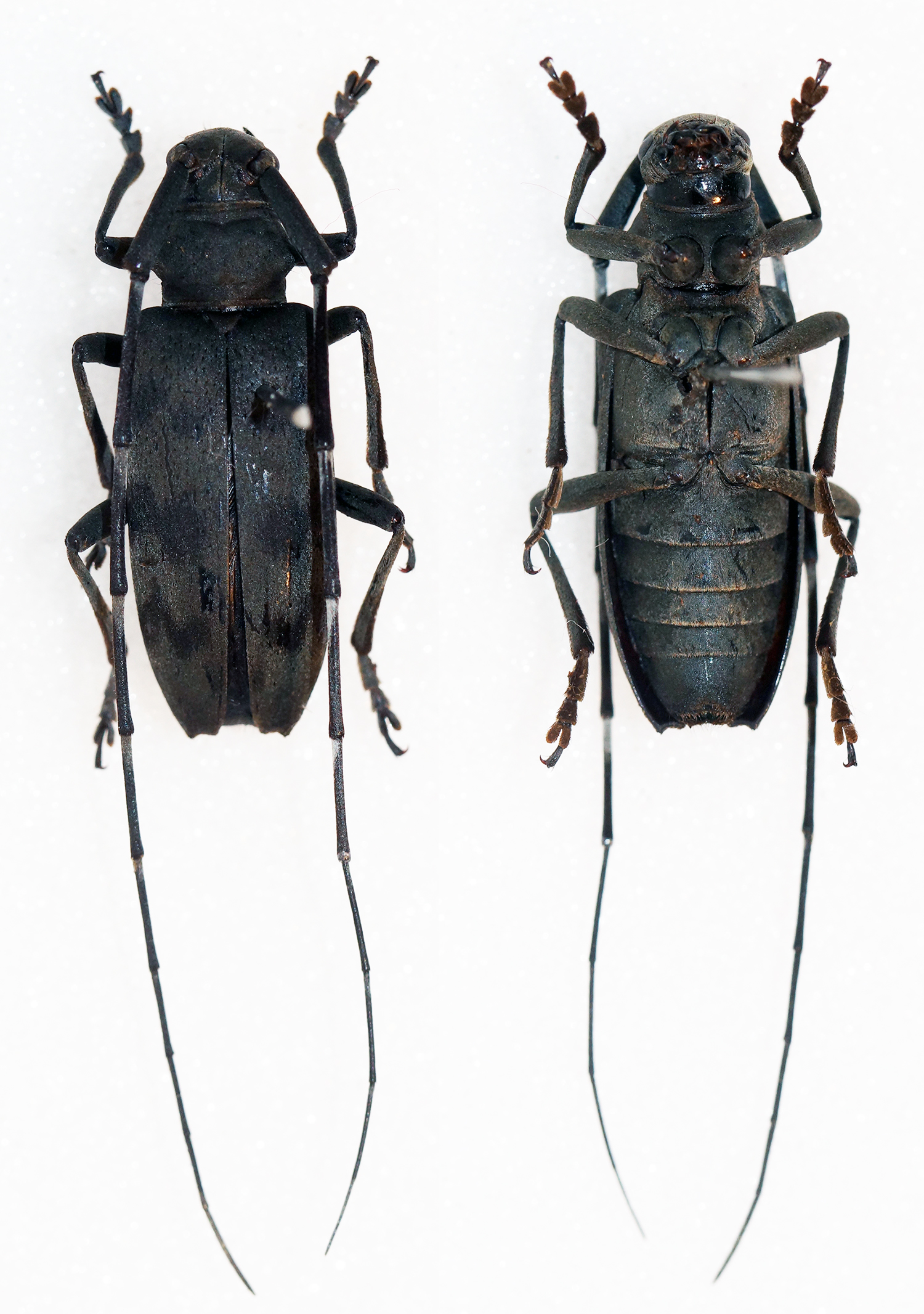

Scientific classification
- Kingdom: Animalia
- Phylum: Arthropoda
- Class: Insecta
- Order: Coleoptera
- Suborder: Polyphaga
- Infraorder: Cucujiformia
- Family: Cerambycidae
- Genus: Blepephaeus
- Species: B. multinotatus

Binomial name
- Blepephaeus multinotatus Pic, 1925

= Blepephaeus multinotatus =

Species of beetle

Blepephaeus multinotatus is a species of beetle in the family Cerambycidae found in Asia in countries such as Vietnam.
