= Peblephaeus satoi =

Scientific classification
- Kingdom: Animalia
- Phylum: Arthropoda
- Class: Insecta
- Order: Coleoptera
- Suborder: Polyphaga
- Infraorder: Cucujiformia
- Family: Cerambycidae
- Genus: Peblephaeus
- Species: P. satoi

Binomial name
- Peblephaeus satoi Makihara, 2003

Species of beetle

Peblephaeus satoi is a species of beetle in the family Cerambycidae. It was described by Hiroshi Makihara in 2003.
