= Pothyne laosica =

Scientific classification
- Kingdom: Animalia
- Phylum: Arthropoda
- Class: Insecta
- Order: Coleoptera
- Suborder: Polyphaga
- Infraorder: Cucujiformia
- Family: Cerambycidae
- Genus: Pothyne
- Species: P. laosica

Binomial name
- Pothyne laosica Breuning, 1968

Species of beetle

Pothyne laosica is a species of beetle in the family Cerambycidae. It was described by Breuning in 1968.
