= Pothyne acaciae =

Scientific classification
- Kingdom: Animalia
- Phylum: Arthropoda
- Class: Insecta
- Order: Coleoptera
- Suborder: Polyphaga
- Infraorder: Cucujiformia
- Family: Cerambycidae
- Genus: Pothyne
- Species: P. acaciae

Binomial name
- Pothyne acaciae Gardner, 1930

Species of beetle

Pothyne acaciae is a species of beetle in the family Cerambycidae. It was described by Gardner in 1930.
