= Blepephaeus marmoratus =

Scientific classification
- Domain: Eukaryota
- Kingdom: Animalia
- Phylum: Arthropoda
- Class: Insecta
- Order: Coleoptera
- Suborder: Polyphaga
- Infraorder: Cucujiformia
- Family: Cerambycidae
- Tribe: Lamiini
- Genus: Blepephaeus
- Species: B. marmoratus

Binomial name
- Blepephaeus marmoratus Heller, 1934

Species of beetle

Blepephaeus marmoratus is a species of beetle in the family Cerambycidae. It was described by Heller in 1934. It is known from the Philippines.
