= Blepephaeus itzingeri =

Scientific classification
- Kingdom: Animalia
- Phylum: Arthropoda
- Class: Insecta
- Order: Coleoptera
- Suborder: Polyphaga
- Infraorder: Cucujiformia
- Family: Cerambycidae
- Genus: Blepephaeus
- Species: B. itzingeri

Binomial name
- Blepephaeus itzingeri Breuning, 1935

Species of beetle

Blepephaeus itzingeri is a species of beetle in the family Cerambycidae. It was described by Stephan von Breuning in 1935. It is known from Vietnam, Laos, and Myanmar.
