= Pothyne uniformis =

Scientific classification
- Kingdom: Animalia
- Phylum: Arthropoda
- Class: Insecta
- Order: Coleoptera
- Suborder: Polyphaga
- Infraorder: Cucujiformia
- Family: Cerambycidae
- Genus: Pothyne
- Species: P. uniformis

Binomial name
- Pothyne uniformis Heller, 1924

Species of beetle

Pothyne uniformis is a species of beetle in the family Cerambycidae. It was described by Heller in 1924.
