= Pothyne burmanensis =

Scientific classification
- Kingdom: Animalia
- Phylum: Arthropoda
- Class: Insecta
- Order: Coleoptera
- Suborder: Polyphaga
- Infraorder: Cucujiformia
- Family: Cerambycidae
- Genus: Pothyne
- Species: P. burmanensis

Binomial name
- Pothyne burmanensis Breuning, 1943

Species of beetle

Pothyne burmanensis is a species of beetle in the family Cerambycidae. It was described by Breuning in 1943.
