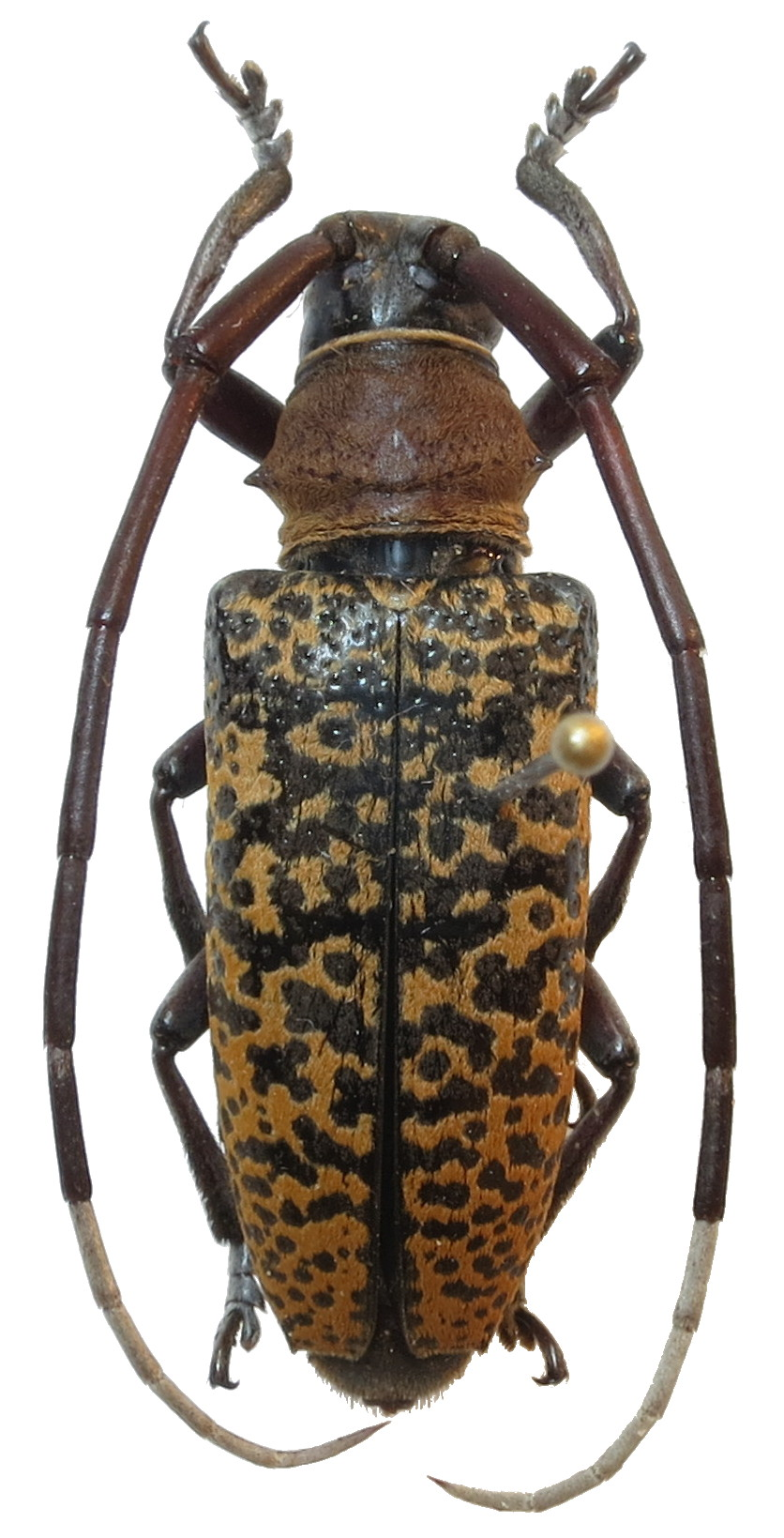
- B. mindanaonis from Philippines

Scientific classification
- Domain: Eukaryota
- Kingdom: Animalia
- Phylum: Arthropoda
- Class: Insecta
- Order: Coleoptera
- Suborder: Polyphaga
- Infraorder: Cucujiformia
- Family: Cerambycidae
- Tribe: Lamiini
- Genus: Blepephaeus
- Species: B. mindanaonis

Binomial name
- Blepephaeus mindanaonis (Schultze, 1920)

Synonyms
- Parablepephaeus lumawigi Breuning, 1980; Pharsalia mindanaonis Schultze, 1920

= Blepephaeus mindanaonis =

Species of insect

Blepephaeus mindanaonis is a species of beetle in the family Cerambycidae. It was described by Schultze in 1920, originally under the genus Pharsalia. It is known from the Philippines.
