= Pothyne kualabokensis =

Scientific classification
- Kingdom: Animalia
- Phylum: Arthropoda
- Class: Insecta
- Order: Coleoptera
- Suborder: Polyphaga
- Infraorder: Cucujiformia
- Family: Cerambycidae
- Genus: Pothyne
- Species: P. kualabokensis

Binomial name
- Pothyne kualabokensis Hayashi, 1976

Species of beetle

Pothyne kualabokensis is a species of beetle in the family Cerambycidae. It was described by Hayashi in 1976.
