= Blepephaeus nigrostigma =

Scientific classification
- Domain: Eukaryota
- Kingdom: Animalia
- Phylum: Arthropoda
- Class: Insecta
- Order: Coleoptera
- Suborder: Polyphaga
- Infraorder: Cucujiformia
- Family: Cerambycidae
- Tribe: Lamiini
- Genus: Blepephaeus
- Species: B. nigrostigma

Binomial name
- Blepephaeus nigrostigma Wang & Jiang, 1998

Species of beetle

Blepephaeus nigrostigma is a species of beetle in the family Cerambycidae. It was described by Wang and Jiang in 1998. It is known from China.
