= Blepephaeus stigmosus =

Scientific classification
- Domain: Eukaryota
- Kingdom: Animalia
- Phylum: Arthropoda
- Class: Insecta
- Order: Coleoptera
- Suborder: Polyphaga
- Infraorder: Cucujiformia
- Family: Cerambycidae
- Tribe: Lamiini
- Genus: Blepephaeus
- Species: B. stigmosus

Binomial name
- Blepephaeus stigmosus Gahan, 1895

Species of beetle

Blepephaeus stigmosus is a species of beetle in the family Cerambycidae. It was described by Charles Joseph Gahan in 1895. It is known from Malaysia, Laos, and Myanmar. It contains the varietas Blepephaeus stigmosus var. laosensis.
