= Pothyne tenuevittata =

Scientific classification
- Kingdom: Animalia
- Phylum: Arthropoda
- Class: Insecta
- Order: Coleoptera
- Suborder: Polyphaga
- Infraorder: Cucujiformia
- Family: Cerambycidae
- Genus: Pothyne
- Species: P. tenuevittata

Binomial name
- Pothyne tenuevittata (Fairmaire, 1888)

Species of beetle

Pothyne tenuevittata is a species of beetle in the family Cerambycidae. It was described by Fairmaire in 1888.
