= Pothyne virgata =

Scientific classification
- Kingdom: Animalia
- Phylum: Arthropoda
- Class: Insecta
- Order: Coleoptera
- Suborder: Polyphaga
- Infraorder: Cucujiformia
- Family: Cerambycidae
- Genus: Pothyne
- Species: P. virgata

Binomial name
- Pothyne virgata Gahan, 1907

Species of beetle

Pothyne virgata is a species of beetle in the family Cerambycidae. It was described by Gahan in 1907. It is distributed in Sumatra.
