= Blepephaeus luteofasciatus =

Scientific classification
- Domain: Eukaryota
- Kingdom: Animalia
- Phylum: Arthropoda
- Class: Insecta
- Order: Coleoptera
- Suborder: Polyphaga
- Infraorder: Cucujiformia
- Family: Cerambycidae
- Tribe: Lamiini
- Genus: Blepephaeus
- Species: B. luteofasciatus

Binomial name
- Blepephaeus luteofasciatus (Gressitt, 1941)

Species of beetle

Blepephaeus luteofasciatus is a species of beetle in the family Cerambycidae. It was described by Gressitt in 1941. It is known from Thailand.
