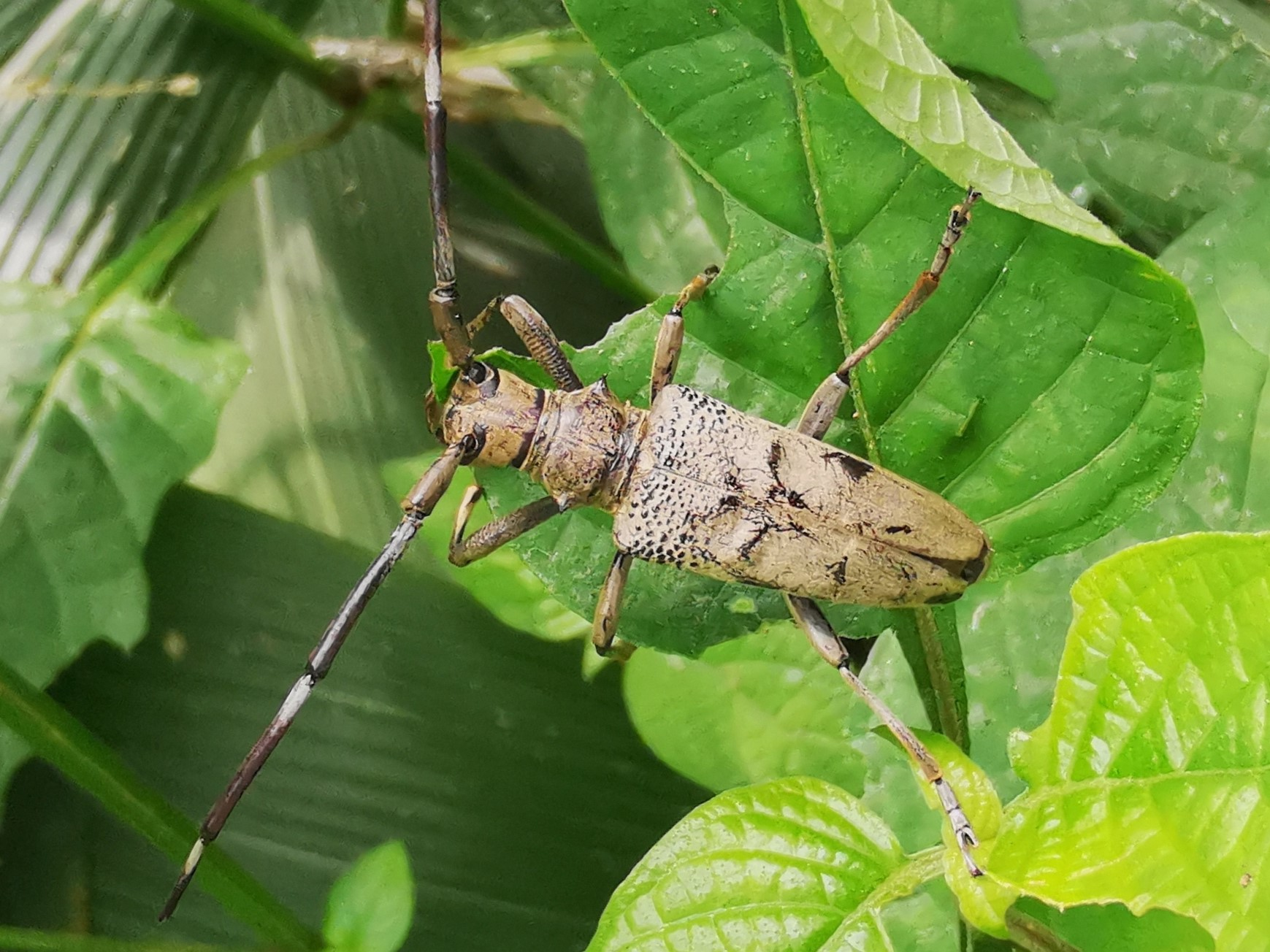

Scientific classification
- Domain: Eukaryota
- Kingdom: Animalia
- Phylum: Arthropoda
- Class: Insecta
- Order: Coleoptera
- Suborder: Polyphaga
- Infraorder: Cucujiformia
- Family: Cerambycidae
- Tribe: Lamiini
- Genus: Blepephaeus
- Species: B. grisescens

Binomial name
- Blepephaeus grisescens Hüdepohl, 1998

= Blepephaeus grisescens =

Species of beetle

Blepephaeus grisescens is a species of beetle in the family Cerambycidae. It was first described by Karl-Ernst Hüdepohl in 1998. It is known from Myanmar and Thailand.
