= Blepephaeus shembaganurensis =

Scientific classification
- Kingdom: Animalia
- Phylum: Arthropoda
- Class: Insecta
- Order: Coleoptera
- Suborder: Polyphaga
- Infraorder: Cucujiformia
- Family: Cerambycidae
- Genus: Blepephaeus
- Species: B. shembaganurensis

Binomial name
- Blepephaeus shembaganurensis Breuning, 1979

Species of beetle

Blepephaeus shembaganurensis is a species of beetle in the family Cerambycidae. It was described by Stephan von Breuning in 1979. It is known from India.
