= Blepephaeus subannulatus =

Scientific classification
- Kingdom: Animalia
- Phylum: Arthropoda
- Class: Insecta
- Order: Coleoptera
- Suborder: Polyphaga
- Infraorder: Cucujiformia
- Family: Cerambycidae
- Genus: Blepephaeus
- Species: B. subannulatus

Binomial name
- Blepephaeus subannulatus Breuning, 1979

Species of beetle

Blepephaeus subannulatus is a species of beetle in the family Cerambycidae. It was described by Stephan von Breuning in 1979. The species is known from China.
