= Pothyne longipennis =

Scientific classification
- Kingdom: Animalia
- Phylum: Arthropoda
- Class: Insecta
- Order: Coleoptera
- Suborder: Polyphaga
- Infraorder: Cucujiformia
- Family: Cerambycidae
- Genus: Pothyne
- Species: P. longipennis

Binomial name
- Pothyne longipennis Breuning, & Itzinger, 1943

Species of beetle

Pothyne longipennis is a species of beetle in the family Cerambycidae. It was described by Stephan von Breuning and Itzinger in 1943.
