= Peblephaeus okinawanus =

Scientific classification
- Kingdom: Animalia
- Phylum: Arthropoda
- Class: Insecta
- Order: Coleoptera
- Suborder: Polyphaga
- Infraorder: Cucujiformia
- Family: Cerambycidae
- Genus: Peblephaeus
- Species: P. okinawanus

Binomial name
- Peblephaeus okinawanus (Hayashi, 1962)

Species of beetle

Peblephaeus okinawanus is a species of beetle in the family Cerambycidae. It was described by Masao Hayashi in 1962.
