= Blepephaeus varius =

Scientific classification
- Kingdom: Animalia
- Phylum: Arthropoda
- Clade: Pancrustacea
- Class: Insecta
- Order: Coleoptera
- Suborder: Polyphaga
- Infraorder: Cucujiformia
- Family: Cerambycidae
- Genus: Blepephaeus
- Species: B. varius

Binomial name
- Blepephaeus varius (Heller, 1898)

Synonyms
- Cereopsius varius Heller, 1898

Species of beetle

Blepephaeus varius is a species of beetle in the family Cerambycidae. It was described by Heller in 1898. It is known from Sulawesi.
