= Pothyne obliquetruncata =

Scientific classification
- Kingdom: Animalia
- Phylum: Arthropoda
- Class: Insecta
- Order: Coleoptera
- Suborder: Polyphaga
- Infraorder: Cucujiformia
- Family: Cerambycidae
- Subfamily: Lamiinae
- Tribe: Agapanthiini
- Genus: Pothyne
- Species: P. obliquetruncata

Binomial name
- Pothyne obliquetruncata Gressitt, 1939

Species of beetle

Pothyne obliquetruncata is a species of long-horned beetle in the family Cerambycidae. It is found in China.
