= Pothyne variegata =

Scientific classification
- Kingdom: Animalia
- Phylum: Arthropoda
- Class: Insecta
- Order: Coleoptera
- Suborder: Polyphaga
- Infraorder: Cucujiformia
- Family: Cerambycidae
- Genus: Pothyne
- Species: P. variegata

Binomial name
- Pothyne variegata Thomson, 1864

Species of beetle

Pothyne variegata is a species of beetle in the family Cerambycidae. It was described by Thomson in 1864.
