= Pothyne multilineata =

Scientific classification
- Kingdom: Animalia
- Phylum: Arthropoda
- Class: Insecta
- Order: Coleoptera
- Suborder: Polyphaga
- Infraorder: Cucujiformia
- Family: Cerambycidae
- Genus: Pothyne
- Species: P. multilineata

Binomial name
- Pothyne multilineata (Pic, 1934)

Species of beetle

Pothyne multilineata is a species of beetle in the family Cerambycidae. It was described by Maurice Pic in 1934.
