= Blepephaeus modicus =

Scientific classification
- Domain: Eukaryota
- Kingdom: Animalia
- Phylum: Arthropoda
- Class: Insecta
- Order: Coleoptera
- Suborder: Polyphaga
- Infraorder: Cucujiformia
- Family: Cerambycidae
- Tribe: Lamiini
- Genus: Blepephaeus
- Species: B. modicus

Binomial name
- Blepephaeus modicus (Gahan, 1888)

Species of beetle

Blepephaeus modicus is a species of beetle in the family Cerambycidae. It was described by Charles Joseph Gahan in 1888. It is known from India.
