= Blepephaeus puae =

Scientific classification
- Domain: Eukaryota
- Kingdom: Animalia
- Phylum: Arthropoda
- Class: Insecta
- Order: Coleoptera
- Suborder: Polyphaga
- Infraorder: Cucujiformia
- Family: Cerambycidae
- Tribe: Lamiini
- Genus: Blepephaeus
- Species: B. puae

Binomial name
- Blepephaeus puae Lin, 2011

Synonyms
- Blepephaeus undulatus (Pu, 1999) nec Pic, 1930; Perihammus undulatus Pu, 1999

Species of beetle

Blepephaeus puae is a species of beetle in the family Cerambycidae. It was described by Lin in 2011. It is known from China.
