= Pothyne =

- Pothyne variegata

Scientific classification
- Kingdom: Animalia
- Phylum: Arthropoda
- Class: Insecta
- Order: Coleoptera
- Suborder: Polyphaga
- Infraorder: Cucujiformia
- Family: Cerambycidae
- Subfamily: Lamiinae
- Tribe: Agapanthiini
- Genus: Pothyne; Thomson, 1864

Genus of beetles

Pothyne is a genus of beetles in the family Cerambycidae, containing the following species:

- Pothyne acaciae Gardner, 1930
- Pothyne albolineata Matsushita, 1933
- Pothyne albosignata Breuning, 1950
- Pothyne albosternalis Breuning, 1982
- Pothyne andamanica Breuning, 1940
- Pothyne annulata Breuning, 1942
- Pothyne annulicornis Breuning, 1948
- Pothyne biguttula Schwarzer, 1929
- Pothyne birmanica Pic, 1930
- Pothyne borneotica Breuning, 1940
- Pothyne burmanensis Breuning, 1943
- Pothyne capito Pascoe, 1866
- Pothyne celebensis Breuning, 1940
- Pothyne celebiana Breuning, 1943
- Pothyne ceylonensis Breuning, 1940
- Pothyne chocolata Gressitt, 1939
- Pothyne combreti Gardner, 1930
- Pothyne convexifrons Gardner, 1930
- Pothyne discomaculata Breuning, 1940
- Pothyne distincta Breuning, 1950
- Pothyne elongata Breuning, 1940
- Pothyne elongatula Breuning, 1948
- Pothyne fasciata Gressitt, 1951
- Pothyne femoralis Breuning, 1940
- Pothyne flavostictica Breuning, 1940
- Pothyne formosana Schwarzer, 1925
- Pothyne fusiscapa Gressitt, 1940
- Pothyne griseolineata Breuning, 1940
- Pothyne griseomarmorata Breuning, 1970
- Pothyne harmandi Breuning, 1948
- Pothyne imasakai Hayashi, 1976
- Pothyne incerta Breuning, 1942
- Pothyne indica Breuning, 1940
- Pothyne indistincta Breuning, 1940
- Pothyne interrupta Pic, 1927
- Pothyne keyensis Breuning, 1948
- Pothyne kualabokensis Hayashi, 1976
- Pothyne laevifrons Breuning, 1943
- Pothyne laosensis (Pic, 1934)
- Pothyne laosica Breuning, 1968
- Pothyne laterialba Gressitt, 1937
- Pothyne lineolata Gressitt, 1940
- Pothyne longipennis Breuning & Itzinger, 1943
- Pothyne longiscapus Breuning, 1948
- Pothyne luteomaculata Breuning, 1982
- Pothyne luzonica Breuning, 1942
- Pothyne macrophthalma Breuning, 1940
- Pothyne malaccensis Breuning, 1942
- Pothyne mimodistincta Breuning, 1968
- Pothyne mindanaonis Breuning, 1942
- Pothyne mouhoti Breuning, 1982
- Pothyne multilineata (Pic, 1934)
- Pothyne multivittata Breuning, 1980
- Pothyne multivittipennis Breuning, 1950
- Pothyne niasica Aurivillius, 1916
- Pothyne obliquetruncata Gressitt, 1939
- Pothyne ochracea Breuning, 1940
- Pothyne ochreolineata Breuning, 1943
- Pothyne ochreovittipennis Breuning, 1968
- Pothyne paralaosensis Breuning, 1968
- Pothyne paraterialba Breuning, 1971
- Pothyne pauloplicata Pic, 1934
- Pothyne philippinica Breuning, 1940
- Pothyne pici Breuning, 1948
- Pothyne polyplicata Hua & She, 1987
- Pothyne postcutellaris Breuning, 1964
- Pothyne proxima Breuning, 1940
- Pothyne pseudolaosensis Breuning, 1977
- Pothyne pseudorufipes Breuning, 1948
- Pothyne rufovittata Breuning, 1943
- Pothyne rugifrons Gressitt, 1940
- Pothyne rugiscapa Breuning, 1940
- Pothyne septemlineata Aurivillius, 1923
- Pothyne septemvittipennis Breuning, 1962
- Pothyne seriata Gressitt, 1940
- Pothyne sericeomaculata Breuning, 1950
- Pothyne sikkimana Breuning, 1969
- Pothyne sikkimensis Breuning, 1940
- Pothyne silacea Pascoe, 1871
- Pothyne sinensis Pic, 1927
- Pothyne siporensis Breuning, 1943
- Pothyne stictica Breuning, 1950
- Pothyne strigata Gahan, 1907
- Pothyne strigatoides Breuning, 1950
- Pothyne subdistincta Breuning, 1950
- Pothyne subfemoralis Breuning, 1968
- Pothyne subvittata Breuning, 1950
- Pothyne subvittipennis Breuning & Ohbayashi, 1966
- Pothyne sumatrana Breuning, 1942
- Pothyne sumatrensis Breuning, 1982
- Pothyne suturalis Pic, 1924
- Pothyne suturella Breuning, 1942
- Pothyne tenuevittata (Fairmaire, 1888)
- Pothyne thibetana Breuning, 1950
- Pothyne trivittata Newman, 1842
- Pothyne uniformis Heller, 1924
- Pothyne variegata Thomson, 1864
- Pothyne variegatoides Breuning, 1968
- Pothyne virgata Gahan, 1907
- Pothyne vittata Aurivillius, 1916
