= Blepephaeus ocellatus =

Scientific classification
- Domain: Eukaryota
- Kingdom: Animalia
- Phylum: Arthropoda
- Class: Insecta
- Order: Coleoptera
- Suborder: Polyphaga
- Infraorder: Cucujiformia
- Family: Cerambycidae
- Tribe: Lamiini
- Genus: Blepephaeus
- Species: B. ocellatus

Binomial name
- Blepephaeus ocellatus (Gahan, 1888)

Synonyms
- Cyriepepeotes wittmeri Breuning, 1975; Epepeotes pauloperforatus Pic, 1930; Monohammus ocellatus Gahan, 1888

Species of beetle

Blepephaeus ocellatus is a species of beetle in the family Cerambycidae. It was described by Charles Joseph Gahan in 1888. It is known from Myanmar, Bhutan, Laos, China, Malaysia, India, Nepal, and Vietnam.
