= Lasiococca =

Scientific classification
- Kingdom: Plantae
- Clade: Tracheophytes
- Clade: Angiosperms
- Clade: Eudicots
- Clade: Rosids
- Order: Malpighiales
- Family: Euphorbiaceae
- Subfamily: Acalyphoideae
- Tribe: Acalypheae
- Subtribe: Lasiococcinae
- Genus: Lasiococca; Hook.f.

Type species
- Lasiococca symphylliifolia (Kurz) Hook.f.

Genus of trees

Lasiococca is a plant genus of the family Euphorbiaceae first described in 1887. These are small to relatively large trees (up to 8 m high) found in scrubs or semi-evergreen forests. They grow in India, Indochina, Southeast Asia, and southern China.

Species

1. Lasiococca brevipes (Merr.) Welzen & S.E.C.Sierra (syn L. malaccensis) - Peninsular Malaysia, Philippines, Lesser Sunda Islands, Sulawesi
2. Lasiococca chanii Thin - Vietnam
3. Lasiococca comberi Haines - Hainan, Yunnan, Vietnam, Thailand, E India
4. Lasiococca locii Thin - Vietnam
5. Lasiococca symphylliifolia (Kurz) Hook.f. - Sikkim
