= Blepephaeus undulatus =

Scientific classification
- Kingdom: Animalia
- Phylum: Arthropoda
- Class: Insecta
- Order: Coleoptera
- Suborder: Polyphaga
- Infraorder: Cucujiformia
- Family: Cerambycidae
- Genus: Blepephaeus
- Species: B. undulatus

Binomial name
- Blepephaeus undulatus (Pic, 1930)

Synonyms
- Psaromaia undulata Pic, 1930

Species of beetle

Blepephaeus undulatus is a species of beetle in the family Cerambycidae. It was described by Maurice Pic in 1930.
