= Blepephaeus leucosticticus =

Scientific classification
- Kingdom: Animalia
- Phylum: Arthropoda
- Clade: Pancrustacea
- Class: Insecta
- Order: Coleoptera
- Suborder: Polyphaga
- Infraorder: Cucujiformia
- Family: Cerambycidae
- Genus: Blepephaeus
- Species: B. leucosticticus

Binomial name
- Blepephaeus leucosticticus Breuning, 1938

Species of beetle

Blepephaeus leucosticticus is a species of beetle in the family Cerambycidae. It was described by Stephan von Breuning in 1938. It is known from Sulawesi.
