= Blepephaeus infelix =

Scientific classification
- Domain: Eukaryota
- Kingdom: Animalia
- Phylum: Arthropoda
- Class: Insecta
- Order: Coleoptera
- Suborder: Polyphaga
- Infraorder: Cucujiformia
- Family: Cerambycidae
- Tribe: Lamiini
- Genus: Blepephaeus
- Species: B. infelix

Binomial name
- Blepephaeus infelix (Pascoe, 1856)

Synonyms
- Monohammus infelix Pascoe, 1856; Perihammus bifasciatus Aurivillius, 1924; Perihammus infelix (Pascoe, 1856)

Species of beetle

Blepephaeus infelix is a species of beetle in the family Cerambycidae. It was described by Francis Polkinghorne Pascoe in 1856. It is known from China and North Korea.
