= Pothyne suturalis =

Scientific classification
- Kingdom: Animalia
- Phylum: Arthropoda
- Clade: Pancrustacea
- Class: Insecta
- Order: Coleoptera
- Suborder: Polyphaga
- Infraorder: Cucujiformia
- Family: Cerambycidae
- Genus: Pothyne
- Species: P. suturalis

Binomial name
- Pothyne suturalis Pic, 1924

Species of beetle

Pothyne suturalis is a species of beetle in the family Cerambycidae. It was described by Maurice Pic in 1924.
