= Blepephaeus laosicus =

Scientific classification
- Kingdom: Animalia
- Phylum: Arthropoda
- Class: Insecta
- Order: Coleoptera
- Suborder: Polyphaga
- Infraorder: Cucujiformia
- Family: Cerambycidae
- Genus: Blepephaeus
- Species: B. laosicus

Binomial name
- Blepephaeus laosicus Breuning, 1947

Species of beetle

Blepephaeus laosicus is a species of beetle in the family Cerambycidae. It was described by Stephan von Breuning in 1947. It is known from Laos.
