= Pothyne birmanica =

Scientific classification
- Kingdom: Animalia
- Phylum: Arthropoda
- Class: Insecta
- Order: Coleoptera
- Suborder: Polyphaga
- Infraorder: Cucujiformia
- Family: Cerambycidae
- Genus: Pothyne
- Species: P. birmanica

Binomial name
- Pothyne birmanica Pic, 1930

Species of beetle

Pothyne birmanica is a species of beetle in the family Cerambycidae. It was described by Maurice Pic in 1930.
