= Blepephaeus mausoni =

Scientific classification
- Kingdom: Animalia
- Phylum: Arthropoda
- Class: Insecta
- Order: Coleoptera
- Suborder: Polyphaga
- Infraorder: Cucujiformia
- Family: Cerambycidae
- Genus: Blepephaeus
- Species: B. mausoni

Binomial name
- Blepephaeus mausoni (Breuning, 1947)

Synonyms
- Perihammus mausoni Breuning, 1947

Species of beetle

Blepephaeus mausoni is a species of beetle in the family Cerambycidae. It was described by Stephan von Breuning in 1947. It is known from Vietnam.
