= Blepephaeus nepalensis =

Scientific classification
- Kingdom: Animalia
- Phylum: Arthropoda
- Class: Insecta
- Order: Coleoptera
- Suborder: Polyphaga
- Infraorder: Cucujiformia
- Family: Cerambycidae
- Genus: Blepephaeus
- Species: B. nepalensis

Binomial name
- Blepephaeus nepalensis (Hayashi, 1981)

Synonyms
- Perihammus nepalensis Hayashi, 1981

Species of beetle

Blepephaeus nepalensis is a species of beetle in the family Cerambycidae. It was described by Masao Hayashi in 1981. It is known from Nepal.
