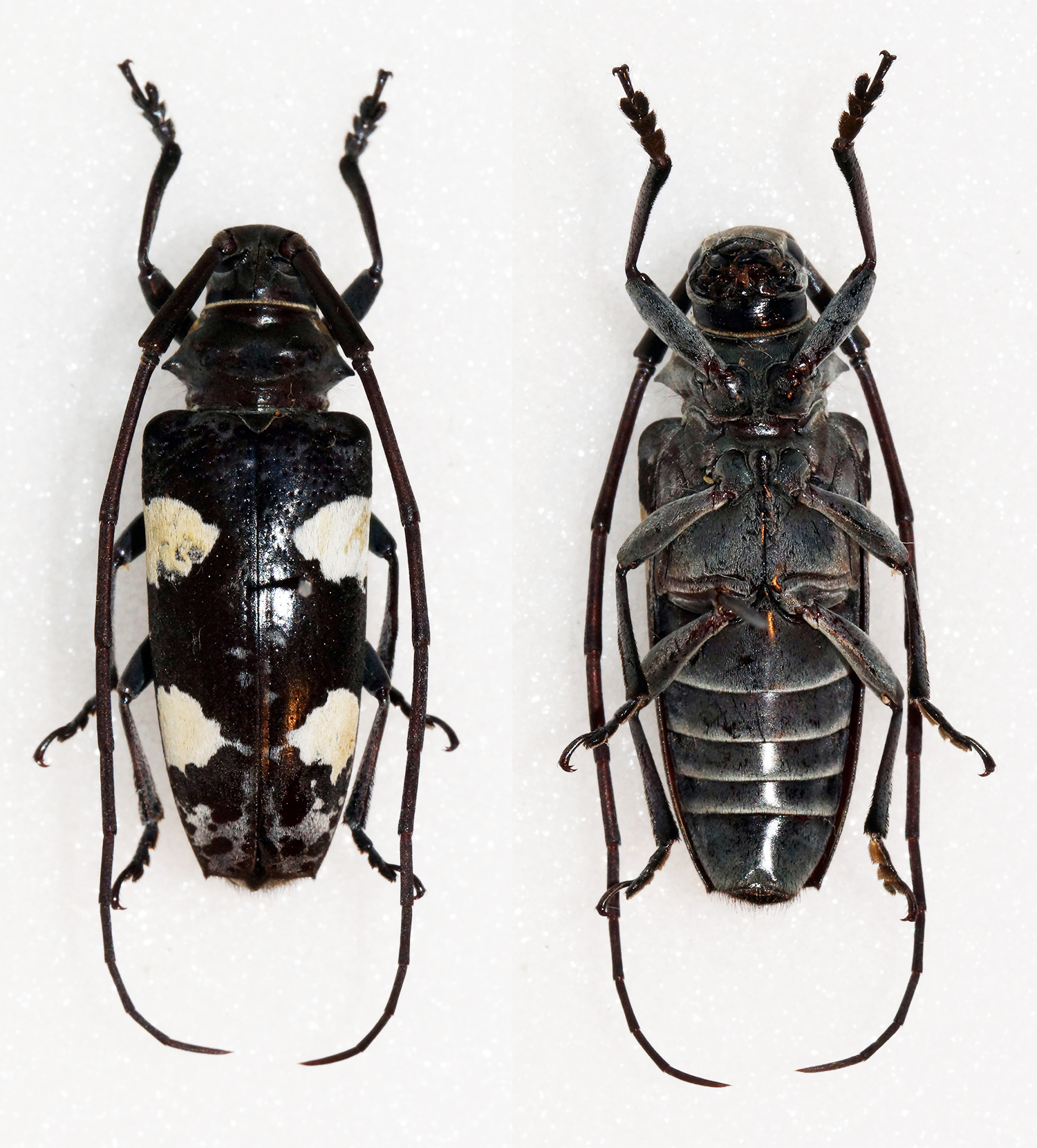

Scientific classification
- Kingdom: Animalia
- Phylum: Arthropoda
- Clade: Pancrustacea
- Class: Insecta
- Order: Coleoptera
- Suborder: Polyphaga
- Infraorder: Cucujiformia
- Family: Cerambycidae
- Genus: Blepephaeus
- Species: B. sumatrensis

Binomial name
- Blepephaeus sumatrensis Breuning, 1938

= Blepephaeus sumatrensis =

Species of beetle

Blepephaeus sumatrensis is a species of beetle in the family Cerambycidae. It was described by Stephan von Breuning in 1938. It is known from Sumatra and Borneo.
