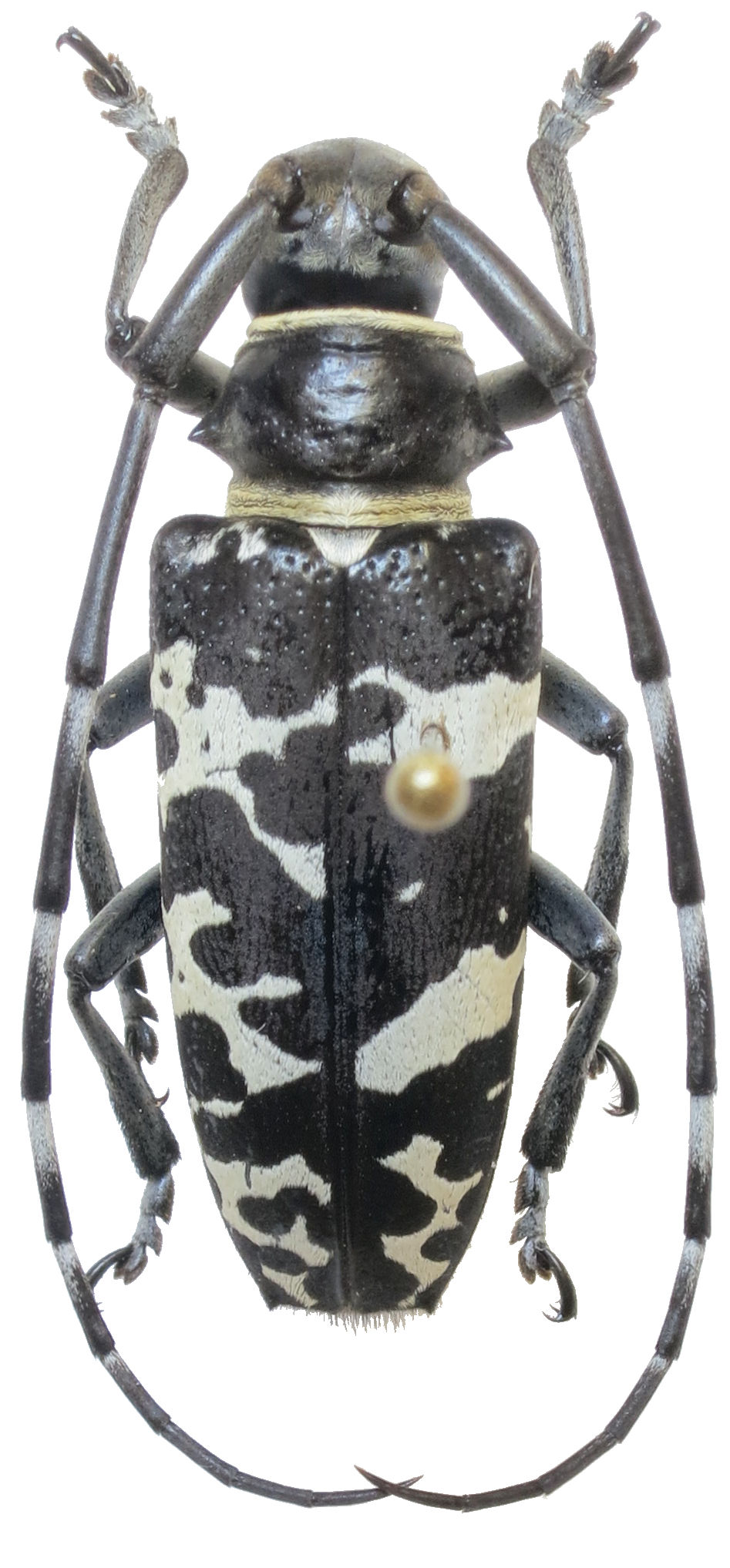
- Blepephaeus irregularis female from Philippines

Scientific classification
- Domain: Eukaryota
- Kingdom: Animalia
- Phylum: Arthropoda
- Class: Insecta
- Order: Coleoptera
- Suborder: Polyphaga
- Infraorder: Cucujiformia
- Family: Cerambycidae
- Tribe: Lamiini
- Genus: Blepephaeus
- Species: B. irregularis

Binomial name
- Blepephaeus irregularis (Heller, 1915)

Synonyms
- Cereopsius irregularis Heller, 1915

= Blepephaeus irregularis =

Species of beetle

Blepephaeus irregularis is a species of beetle in the family Cerambycidae. It was described by Heller in 1915. It is known from the Philippines. It contains the varietas Blepephaeus irregularis var. alboreductus.
