= Blepephaeus fulvus =

Scientific classification
- Kingdom: Animalia
- Phylum: Arthropoda
- Class: Insecta
- Order: Coleoptera
- Suborder: Polyphaga
- Infraorder: Cucujiformia
- Family: Cerambycidae
- Genus: Blepephaeus
- Species: B. fulvus

Binomial name
- Blepephaeus fulvus (Pic, 1933)

Synonyms
- Blepephaeus pardalinus Breuning, 1935; Urecha fulva Pic, 1933

Species of beetle

Blepephaeus fulvus is a species of beetle in the family Cerambycidae. It was described by Maurice Pic in 1933. It is known from Malaysia, China, Vietnam, and Thailand.
