= Peblephaeus ishigakianus =

Scientific classification
- Kingdom: Animalia
- Phylum: Arthropoda
- Class: Insecta
- Order: Coleoptera
- Suborder: Polyphaga
- Infraorder: Cucujiformia
- Family: Cerambycidae
- Genus: Peblephaeus
- Species: P. ishigakianus

Binomial name
- Peblephaeus ishigakianus (Yokoyama, 1971)

Species of beetle

Peblephaeus ishigakianus is a species of beetle in the family Cerambycidae. It was described by Yokoyama in 1971.
