= Blepephaeus subcruciatus =

Scientific classification
- Domain: Eukaryota
- Kingdom: Animalia
- Phylum: Arthropoda
- Class: Insecta
- Order: Coleoptera
- Suborder: Polyphaga
- Infraorder: Cucujiformia
- Family: Cerambycidae
- Tribe: Lamiini
- Genus: Blepephaeus
- Species: B. subcruciatus

Binomial name
- Blepephaeus subcruciatus (White, 1858)

Synonyms
- Monohammus subcruciatus White, 1858

Species of beetle

Blepephaeus subcruciatus is a species of beetle in the family Cerambycidae. It was described by White in 1858.
