= Pothyne trivittata =

Scientific classification
- Kingdom: Animalia
- Phylum: Arthropoda
- Class: Insecta
- Order: Coleoptera
- Suborder: Polyphaga
- Infraorder: Cucujiformia
- Family: Cerambycidae
- Genus: Pothyne
- Species: P. trivittata

Binomial name
- Pothyne trivittata Newman, 1842

Species of beetle

Pothyne trivittata is a species of beetle in the family Cerambycidae. It was described by Newman in 1842.
