= Blepephaeus nigrosparsus =

Scientific classification
- Kingdom: Animalia
- Phylum: Arthropoda
- Class: Insecta
- Order: Coleoptera
- Suborder: Polyphaga
- Infraorder: Cucujiformia
- Family: Cerambycidae
- Genus: Blepephaeus
- Species: B. nigrosparsus

Binomial name
- Blepephaeus nigrosparsus Pic, 1925

Species of beetle

Blepephaeus nigrosparsus is a species of beetle in the family Cerambycidae. It was described by Maurice Pic in 1925. It is known from China.
