= Pothyne sumatrana =

Scientific classification
- Kingdom: Animalia
- Phylum: Arthropoda
- Class: Insecta
- Order: Coleoptera
- Suborder: Polyphaga
- Infraorder: Cucujiformia
- Family: Cerambycidae
- Genus: Pothyne
- Species: P. sumatrana

Binomial name
- Pothyne sumatrana Breuning, 1942

Species of beetle

Pothyne sumatrana is a species of beetle in the family Cerambycidae. It was described by Breuning in 1942.
