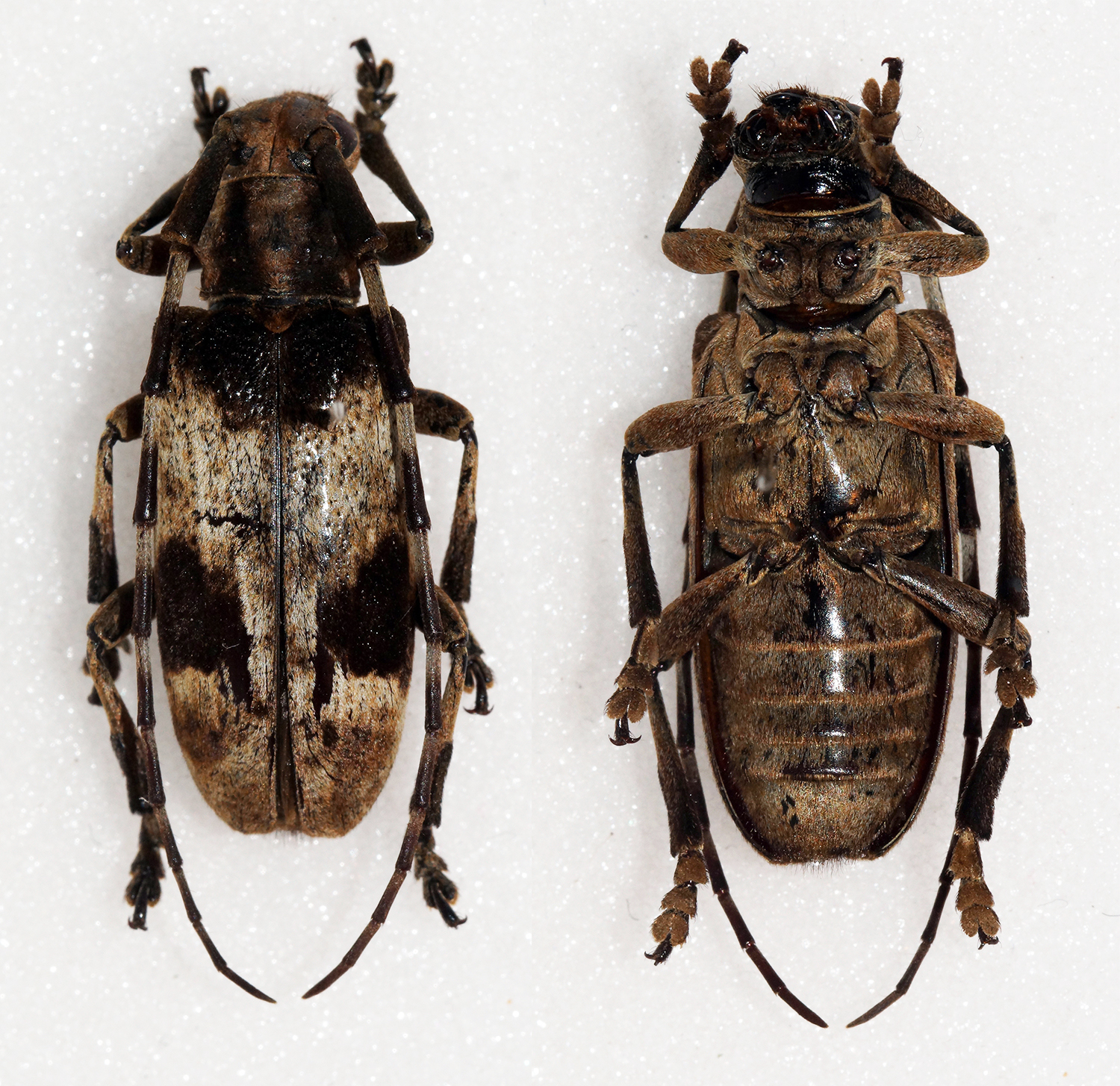

Scientific classification
- Domain: Eukaryota
- Kingdom: Animalia
- Phylum: Arthropoda
- Class: Insecta
- Order: Coleoptera
- Suborder: Polyphaga
- Infraorder: Cucujiformia
- Family: Cerambycidae
- Tribe: Lamiini
- Genus: Blepephaeus
- Species: B. succinctor

Binomial name
- Blepephaeus succinctor (Chevrolat, 1852)

Synonyms
- Coelosterna fleutiauxi Lameere, 1893; Monohammus obfuscatus White, 1858; Monohammus sublineatus White, 1858; Monohammus succinctor Chevrolat, 1852; Neanthes scutellaris Fairmaire, 1895; Perihammus fuscomaculatus Breuning, 1948

= Blepephaeus succinctor =

Species of beetle

Blepephaeus succinctor is a species of beetle in the family Cerambycidae. It was described by Louis Alexandre Auguste Chevrolat in 1852, originally under the genus Monohammus. It is known from Malaysia, India, Sumatra, Myanmar, Taiwan, China, Thailand, and Vietnam. It feeds on Acacia confusa, Albizia chinensis, Firmiana simplex, Melia azedarach, Morus alba, and Vernicia fordii.

== Subspecies ==
- Blepephaeus succinctor succinctor (Chevrolat, 1852)
- Blepephaeus succinctor sumatrensis Breuning, 1965
