= Pothyne lineolata =

Scientific classification
- Kingdom: Animalia
- Phylum: Arthropoda
- Class: Insecta
- Order: Coleoptera
- Suborder: Polyphaga
- Infraorder: Cucujiformia
- Family: Cerambycidae
- Genus: Pothyne
- Species: P. lineolata

Binomial name
- Pothyne lineolata Gressitt, 1940

Species of beetle

Pothyne lineolata is a species of beetle in the family Cerambycidae. It was described by Gressitt in 1940.
