= Pothyne pseudorufipes =

Scientific classification
- Kingdom: Animalia
- Phylum: Arthropoda
- Class: Insecta
- Order: Coleoptera
- Suborder: Polyphaga
- Infraorder: Cucujiformia
- Family: Cerambycidae
- Genus: Pothyne
- Species: P. pseudorufipes

Binomial name
- Pothyne pseudorufipes Breuning, 1948

Species of beetle

Pothyne pseudorufipes is a species of beetle in the family Cerambycidae. It was described by Breuning in 1948.
