= Pothyne laterialba =

Scientific classification
- Kingdom: Animalia
- Phylum: Arthropoda
- Class: Insecta
- Order: Coleoptera
- Suborder: Polyphaga
- Infraorder: Cucujiformia
- Family: Cerambycidae
- Genus: Pothyne
- Species: P. laterialba

Binomial name
- Pothyne laterialba Gressitt, 1937

Species of beetle

Pothyne laterialba is a species of beetle belonging to the family Cerambycidae, commonly known as longhorn beetles. The species was first formally described by entomologist Judson Linsley Gressitt in 1937.
