= Pothyne capito =

Scientific classification
- Kingdom: Animalia
- Phylum: Arthropoda
- Class: Insecta
- Order: Coleoptera
- Suborder: Polyphaga
- Infraorder: Cucujiformia
- Family: Cerambycidae
- Genus: Pothyne
- Species: P. capito

Binomial name
- Pothyne capito Pascoe, 1866

Species of beetle

Pothyne capito is a species of beetle in the family Cerambycidae. It was described by Pascoe in 1866.
