= Peblephaeus lutaoensis =

Scientific classification
- Kingdom: Animalia
- Phylum: Arthropoda
- Class: Insecta
- Order: Coleoptera
- Suborder: Polyphaga
- Infraorder: Cucujiformia
- Family: Cerambycidae
- Genus: Peblephaeus
- Species: P. lutaoensis

Binomial name
- Peblephaeus lutaoensis Takakuwa, 1991

Species of beetle

Peblephaeus lutaoensis is a species of beetle in the family Cerambycidae. It was described by Takakuwa in 1991.
