= Pothyne subvittipennis =

Scientific classification
- Kingdom: Animalia
- Phylum: Arthropoda
- Class: Insecta
- Order: Coleoptera
- Suborder: Polyphaga
- Infraorder: Cucujiformia
- Family: Cerambycidae
- Genus: Pothyne
- Species: P. subvittipennis

Binomial name
- Pothyne subvittipennis Breuning, & Ohbayashi, 1966

Species of beetle

Pothyne subvittipennis is a species of beetle in the family Cerambycidae. It was described by Stephan von Breuning and Ohbayashi, in 1966.
