= Pothyne chocolata =

Scientific classification
- Kingdom: Animalia
- Phylum: Arthropoda
- Class: Insecta
- Order: Coleoptera
- Suborder: Polyphaga
- Infraorder: Cucujiformia
- Family: Cerambycidae
- Genus: Pothyne
- Species: P. chocolata

Binomial name
- Pothyne chocolata Gressitt, 1939

Species of beetle

Pothyne chocolata is a species of beetle in the family Cerambycidae. It was described by Gressitt in 1939.
