= Pothyne sinensis =

Scientific classification
- Kingdom: Animalia
- Phylum: Arthropoda
- Class: Insecta
- Order: Coleoptera
- Suborder: Polyphaga
- Infraorder: Cucujiformia
- Family: Cerambycidae
- Genus: Pothyne
- Species: P. sinensis

Binomial name
- Pothyne sinensis Pic, 1927

Species of beetle

Pothyne sinensis is a species of beetle in the family Cerambycidae. It was described by Maurice Pic in 1927.
