= Pothyne polyplicata =

Scientific classification
- Kingdom: Animalia
- Phylum: Arthropoda
- Class: Insecta
- Order: Coleoptera
- Suborder: Polyphaga
- Infraorder: Cucujiformia
- Family: Cerambycidae
- Genus: Pothyne
- Species: P. polyplicata

Binomial name
- Pothyne polyplicata Hua & She, 1987

Species of beetle

Pothyne polyplicata is a species of beetle in the family Cerambycidae. It was described by Hua and She in 1987.
