= Pothyne silacea =

Scientific classification
- Kingdom: Animalia
- Phylum: Arthropoda
- Class: Insecta
- Order: Coleoptera
- Suborder: Polyphaga
- Infraorder: Cucujiformia
- Family: Cerambycidae
- Genus: Pothyne
- Species: P. silacea

Binomial name
- Pothyne silacea Pascoe, 1871

Species of beetle

Pothyne silacea is a species of beetle in the family Cerambycidae. It was described by Pascoe in 1871.
