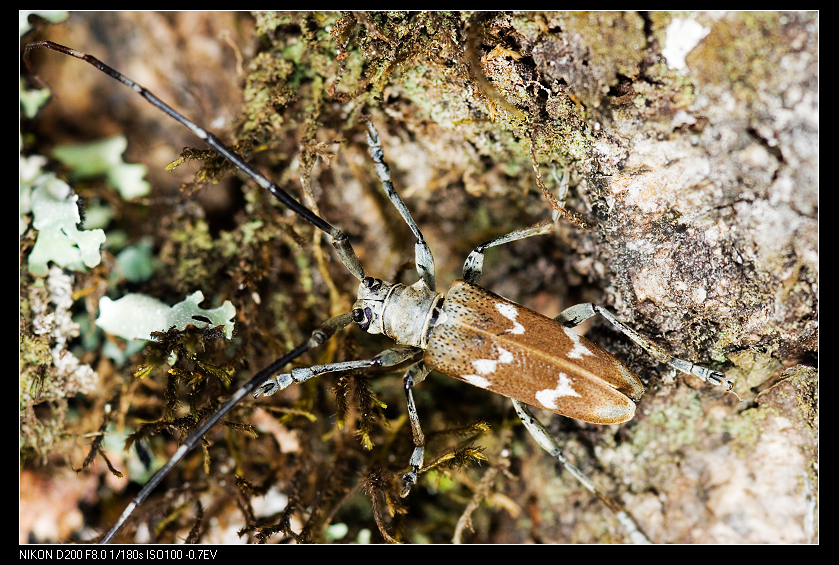
- Peblephaeus ziczac

Scientific classification
- Kingdom: Animalia
- Phylum: Arthropoda
- Class: Insecta
- Order: Coleoptera
- Suborder: Polyphaga
- Infraorder: Cucujiformia
- Family: Cerambycidae
- Tribe: Lamiini
- Genus: Peblephaeus; Kusama & Takakuwa, 1984

= Peblephaeus =

Genus of beetles

Peblephaeus is a genus of longhorn beetles of the subfamily Lamiinae, containing the following species:

- Peblephaeus decoloratus (Schwarzer, 1925)
- Peblephaeus ishigakianus (Yokoyama, 1971)
- Peblephaeus lutaoensis Takakuwa, 1991
- Peblephaeus nobuoi (Breuning & Ohbayashi, 1966)
- Peblephaeus okinawanus (Hayashi, 1962)
- Peblephaeus satoi Makihara, 2003
- Peblephaeus yayeyamai (Breuning, 1955)
