= Blepephaeus lemoulti =

Scientific classification
- Kingdom: Animalia
- Phylum: Arthropoda
- Class: Insecta
- Order: Coleoptera
- Suborder: Polyphaga
- Infraorder: Cucujiformia
- Family: Cerambycidae
- Genus: Blepephaeus
- Species: B. lemoulti

Binomial name
- Blepephaeus lemoulti (Breuning, 1938)

Synonyms
- Perihammus lemoulti Breuning, 1938

Species of beetle

Blepephaeus lemoulti is a species of beetle in the family Cerambycidae. It was described by Stephan von Breuning in 1938. It is known from Laos.
