= Blepephaeus malaccensis =

Scientific classification
- Kingdom: Animalia
- Phylum: Arthropoda
- Class: Insecta
- Order: Coleoptera
- Suborder: Polyphaga
- Infraorder: Cucujiformia
- Family: Cerambycidae
- Genus: Blepephaeus
- Species: B. malaccensis

Binomial name
- Blepephaeus malaccensis Breuning, 1935

Species of beetle

Blepephaeus malaccensis is a species of beetle in the family Cerambycidae. It was described by Stephan von Breuning in 1935. It is known from Borneo and Malaysia.
