= Acalolepta malaccensis =

Scientific classification
- Kingdom: Animalia
- Phylum: Arthropoda
- Class: Insecta
- Order: Coleoptera
- Suborder: Polyphaga
- Infraorder: Cucujiformia
- Family: Cerambycidae
- Genus: Acalolepta
- Species: A. malaccensis

Binomial name
- Acalolepta malaccensis (Breuning, 1936)

Synonyms
- Dihammus malaccensis Breuning, 1936

Species of beetle

Acalolepta malaccensis is a species of beetle in the family Cerambycidae. It was described by Stephan von Breuning in 1936. It is known from Malaysia.
