= Lasiococca brevipes =

Scientific classification
- Kingdom: Plantae
- Clade: Tracheophytes
- Clade: Angiosperms
- Clade: Eudicots
- Clade: Rosids
- Order: Malpighiales
- Family: Euphorbiaceae
- Genus: Lasiococca
- Species: L. brevipes

Binomial name
- Lasiococca brevipes (Merr.) Welzen & S.E.C.Sierra

Synonyms
- Lasiococca malaccensis Airy Shaw; Mallotus brevipes Merr.

Species of plant

Lasiococca brevipes, synonym Lasiococca malaccensis, is a species of flowering plant in the family Euphorbiaceae, native to the Lesser Sunda Islands, Peninsular Malaysia, the Philippines, and Sulawesi. It was first described by Elmer Drew Merrill in 1915 as Mallotus brevipes.

== Conservation ==
Lasiococca malaccensis was assessed as "vulnerable" in the 1998 IUCN Red List, where it is said to be native only to Peninsular Malaysia. As of February 2023, L. malaccensis was regarded as a synonym of Lasiococca brevipes, which has a wider distribution.
