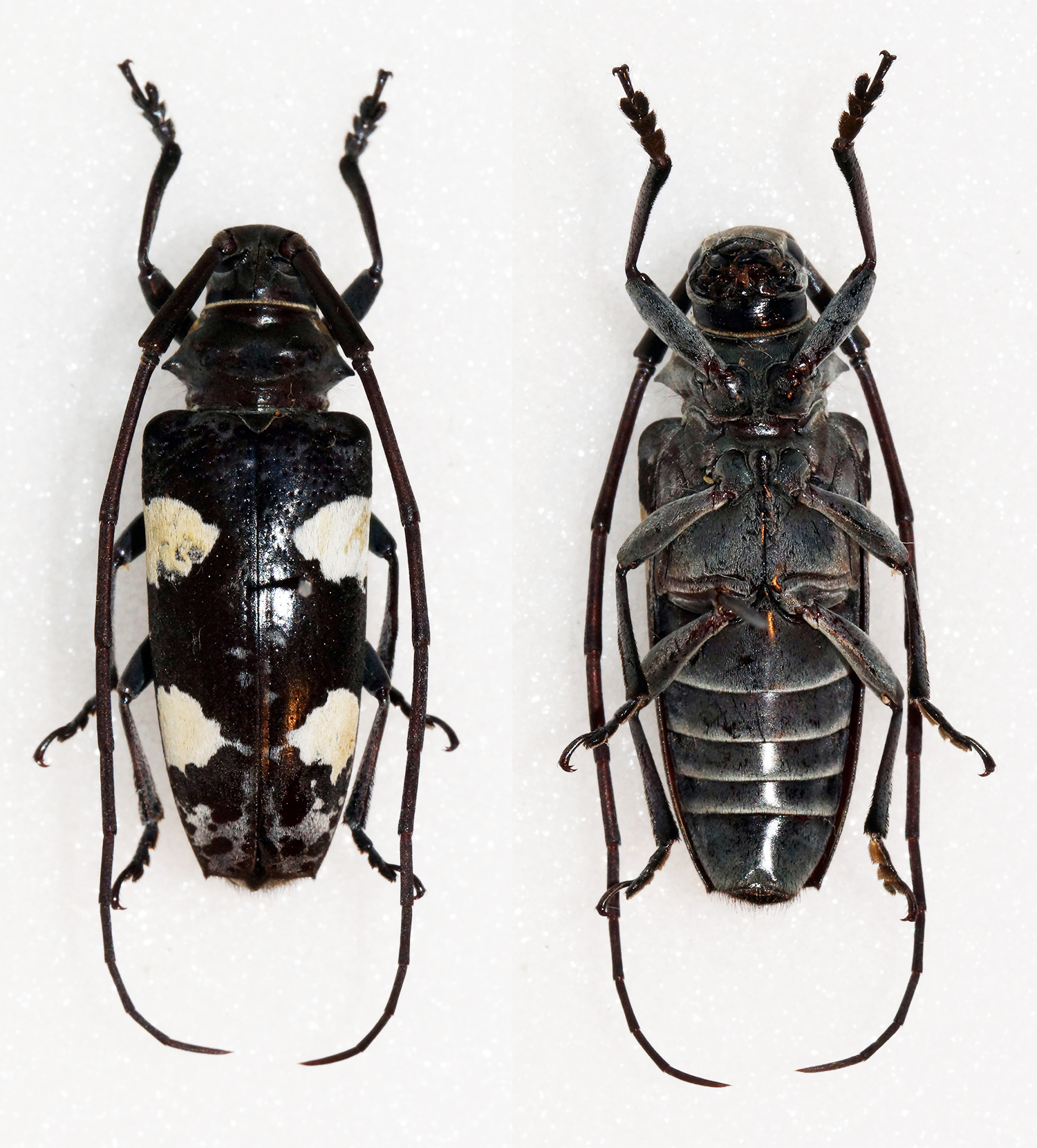
- Blepephaeus sumatrensis

Scientific classification
- Domain: Eukaryota
- Kingdom: Animalia
- Phylum: Arthropoda
- Class: Insecta
- Order: Coleoptera
- Suborder: Polyphaga
- Infraorder: Cucujiformia
- Family: Cerambycidae
- Subfamily: Lamiinae
- Tribe: Lamiini
- Genus: Blepephaeus; Pascoe, 1866

= Blepephaeus =

Genus of beetles

Blepephaeus is a genus of longhorn beetles of the subfamily Lamiinae, containing the following species:

- Blepephaeus agenor (Newman, 1842)
- Blepephaeus andamanicus Breuning, 1935
- Blepephaeus annulatus Breuning, 1936
- Blepephaeus arrowi Breuning, 1935
- Blepephaeus bangalorensis Breuning, 1957
- Blepephaeus banksi Breuning, 1936
- Blepephaeus bipunctatus Breuning & de Jong, 1941
- Blepephaeus blairi Breuning, 1935
- Blepephaeus borneensis Breuning, 1944
- Blepephaeus fulvus (Pic, 1933)
- Blepephaeus grisescens Hüdepohl, 1998
- Blepephaeus hiekei Breuning, 1974
- Blepephaeus higaononi Vives, 2009
- Blepephaeus indicus Breuning, 1935
- Blepephaeus infelix (Pascoe, 1856)
- Blepephaeus irregularis (Heller, 1915)
- Blepephaeus itzingeri Breuning, 1935
- Blepephaeus laosicus Breuning, 1947
- Blepephaeus lemoulti (Breuning, 1938)
- Blepephaeus leucosticticus Breuning, 1938
- Blepephaeus lignosus Breuning, 1950
- Blepephaeus luteofasciatus (Gressitt, 1941)
- Blepephaeus malaccensis Breuning, 1935
- Blepephaeus marmoratus Heller, 1934
- Blepephaeus marshalli Breuning, 1935
- Blepephaeus mausoni (Breuning, 1947)
- Blepephaeus mindanaonis (Schultze, 1920)
- Blepephaeus modicus (Gahan, 1888)
- Blepephaeus multinotatus (Pic, 1925)
- Blepephaeus nepalensis (Hayashi, 1981)
- Blepephaeus niasicus Breuning, 1950
- Blepephaeus nicobaricus Breuning, 1935
- Blepephaeus nigrofasciatus Pu, 1999
- Blepephaeus nigrosparsus Pic, 1925
- Blepephaeus nigrostigma Wang & Jiang, 1998
- Blepephaeus ocellatus (Gahan, 1888)
- Blepephaeus puae Lin, 2011
- Blepephaeus shembaganurensis Breuning, 1979
- Blepephaeus stigmosus Gahan, 1895
- Blepephaeus strandi Breuning, 1936
- Blepephaeus subannulatus Breuning, 1979
- Blepephaeus subcruciatus (White, 1858)
- Blepephaeus succinctor (Chevrolat, 1852)
- Blepephaeus sumatrensis Breuning, 1938
- Blepephaeus undulatus (Pic, 1930)
- Blepephaeus varius (Heller, 1898)
