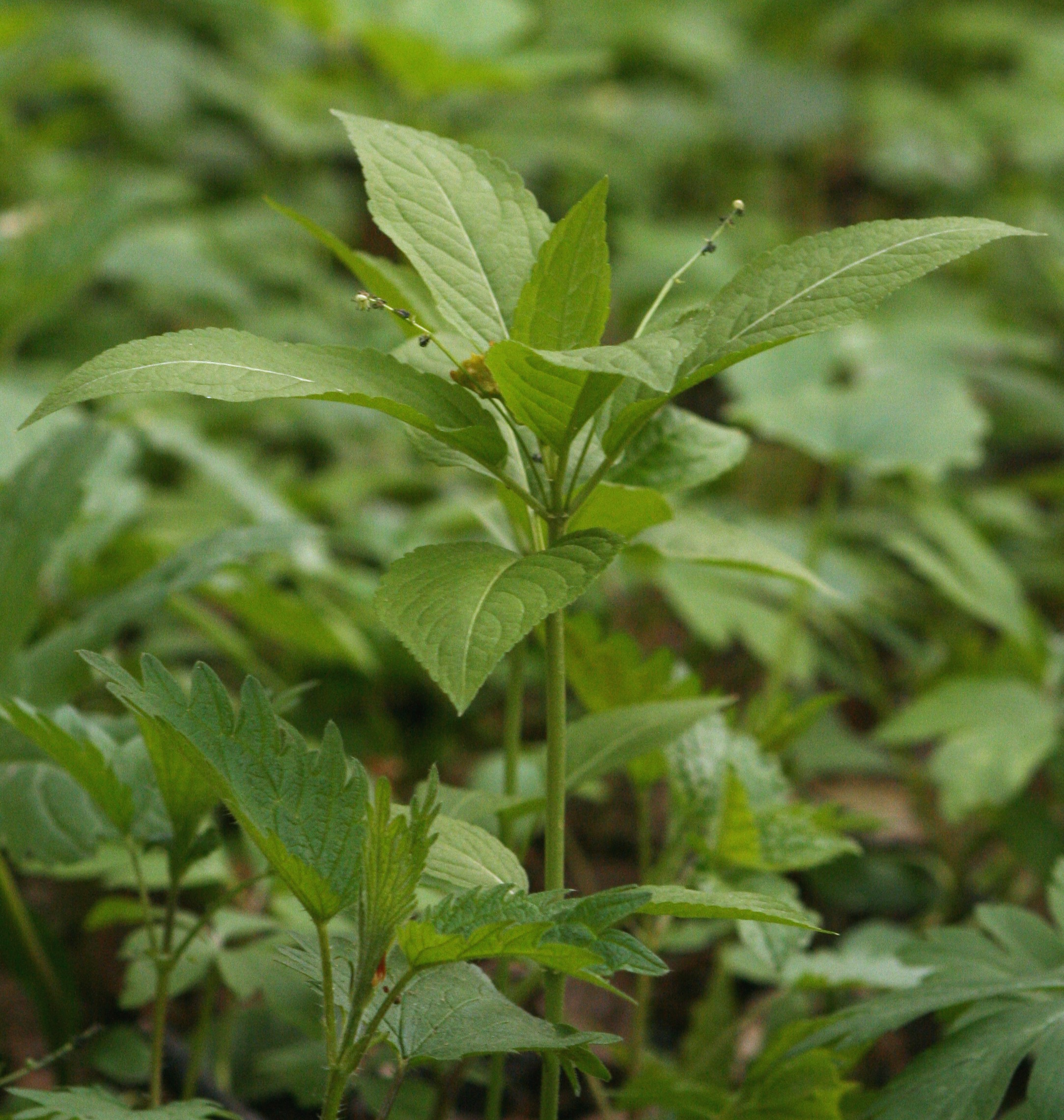
- Mercurialis perennis

Scientific classification
- Kingdom: Plantae
- Clade: Embryophytes
- Clade: Tracheophytes
- Clade: Angiosperms
- Clade: Eudicots
- Clade: Rosids
- Order: Malpighiales
- Family: Euphorbiaceae
- Subtribe: Mercurialinae
- Genus: Mercurialis; L.

Type species
- Mercurialis perennis L.

Synonyms
- Cynocrambe Hill; Discoplis Raf.; Synema Dulac

= Mercurialis (plant) =

Mercuries

Genus of flowering plants in the spurge family

Mercurialis /mərˌkjʊəriˈælɪs/ is a genus of plants in the family Euphorbiaceae, the spurges, known commonly as the mercuries. These are slender herbs (forbs), rhizomatious perennials and woody perennials, native to Europe, North Africa, and Asia.

Species

1. Mercurialis annua L. – most of Europe, North Africa, the Middle East (from Turkey to Iran and Qatar), and islands of the eastern Atlantic (Canary Islands, Azores, Madeira, etc.)
2. Mercurialis canariensis Obbard & S.A.Harris – Canary Islands
3. Mercurialis corsica Coss. & Kralik – Corsica, Sardinia
4. Mercurialis elliptica Lam. – Spain, Portugal, Morocco
5. Mercurialis huetii Hanry – Spain, France, Morocco
6. Mercurialis leiocarpa Siebold & Zucc. – China, Japan, Korea, Ryukyu Islands, Thailand, Assam, Bhutan, Nepal
7. Mercurialis × longifolia Lam. – Spain, Portugal, France (M. annua × M. tomentosa)
8. Mercurialis ovata Sternb. & Hoppe – C + E Europe and SW Asia from Germany + Italy to Russia + Syria
9. Mercurialis × paxii Graebn. – C + E Europe from Germany to Crimea (M. ovata × M. perennis)
10. Mercurialis perennis L. – most of Europe plus Algeria, Caucasus, Turkey, Iran
11. Mercurialis reverchonii Rouy – Spain, Morocco
12. Mercurialis tomentosa L. – Spain, Portugal, France, Balearic Islands

formerly included

transferred to other genera (Acalypha Adenocline Claoxylon Leidesia Micrococca Seidelia Speranskia )

1. M. abyssinica – Micrococca mercurialis
2. M. acanthocarpa – Speranskia cantonensis
3. M. alternifolia Lam. 1797 not Hochst. ex Baill. 1858 – Micrococca mercurialis
4. M. alternifolia Hochst. ex Baill. 1858 not Lam. 1797 – Acalypha hochstetteriana
5. M. androgyna – Leidesia procumbens
6. M. angustifolia – Claoxylon angustifolium
7. M. australis – Claoxylon australe
8. M. bupleuroides – Adenocline pauciflora var. bupleuroides
9. M. caffra – Adenocline acuta
10. M. capensis – Leidesia procumbens
11. M. cucullata – Acalypha segetalis
12. M. dregeana – Adenocline acuta
13. M. indica – Claoxylon hainanense
14. M. pauciflora – Adenocline pauciflora
15. M. procumbens – Leidesia procumbens
16. M. pumila – Seidelia triandra
17. M. serrata – Adenocline pauciflora var. ovalifolia
18. M. subcordata – Adenocline acuta
19. M. tenella – Adenocline pauciflora var. tenella
20. M. tenerifolia – Claoxylon tenerifolium
21. M. triandra – Seidelia triandra
22. M. tricocca Eckl. & Zeyh. ex Krauss 1845 not E.Mey. ex Sond. 1850 – Leidesia procumbens
23. M. tricocca E.Mey. ex Sond. 1850 not Eckl. & Zeyh. ex Krauss 1845 – Adenocline violifolia
24. M. violifolia – Adenocline violifolia
25. M. Mercurialis zeyheri – Adenocline pauciflora var. transiens

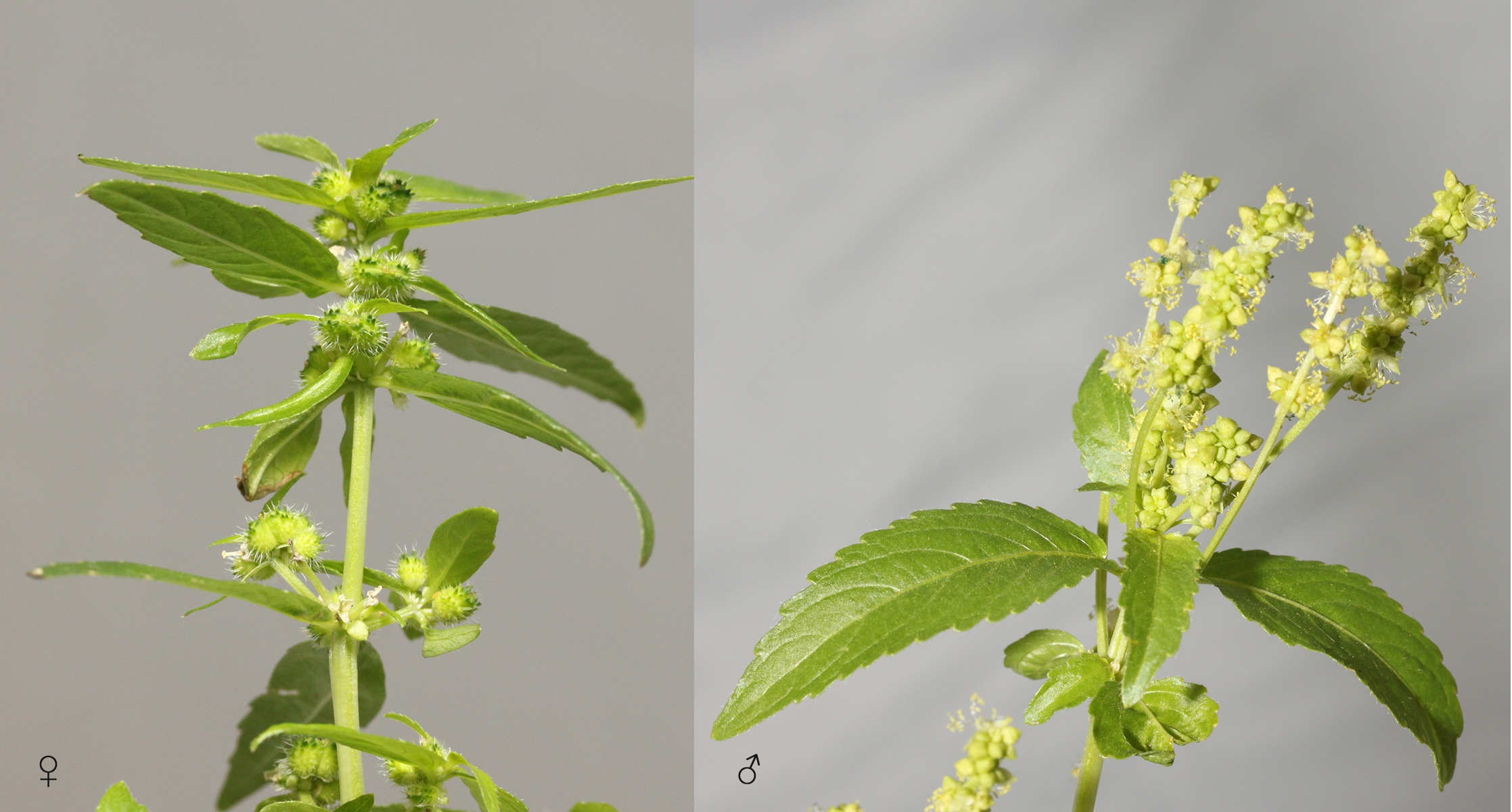
