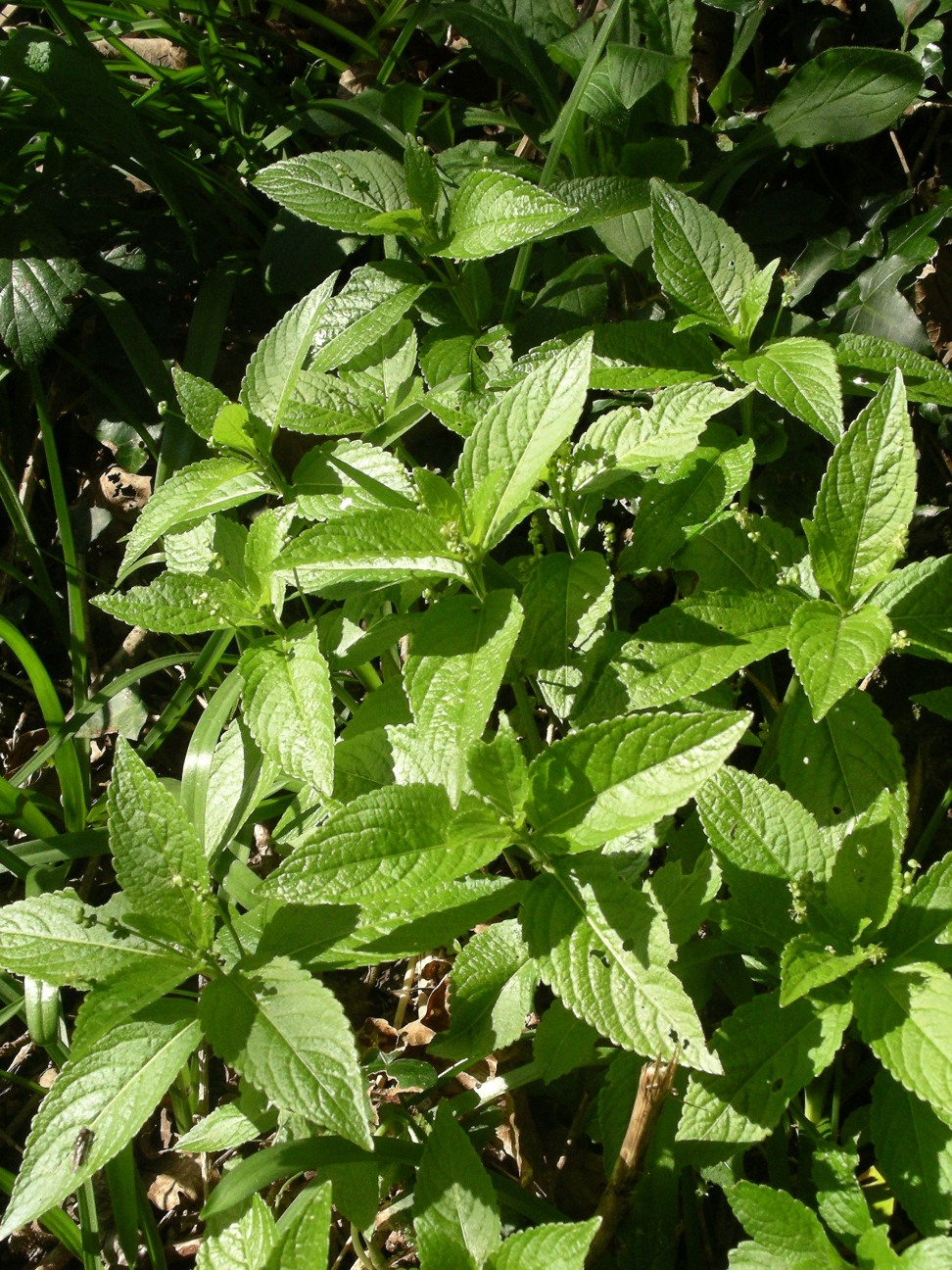

Scientific classification
- Kingdom: Plantae
- Clade: Tracheophytes
- Clade: Angiosperms
- Clade: Eudicots
- Clade: Rosids
- Order: Malpighiales
- Family: Euphorbiaceae
- Genus: Mercurialis
- Species: M. perennis

Binomial name
- Mercurialis perennis L.

= Mercurialis perennis =

Dog's mercury

Species of flowering plant in the spurge family

Mercurialis perennis, commonly known as dog's mercury, is a poisonous woodland plant found in much of Europe as well as in Algeria, Iran, Turkey, and the Caucasus, but almost absent from Ireland, Orkney and Shetland. A member of the spurge family (Euphorbiaceae), it is a herbaceous, downy perennial with erect stems bearing simple, serrate leaves. The dioecious inflorescences are green, bearing inconspicuous flowers from February to April. It characteristically forms dense, extensive carpets on the floor of woodlands and beneath hedgerows.

== Growth and location ==
Mercurialis perennis is a herbaceous plant. It usually grows in dense masses often in the ground flora of beech, oak, ash, elm and other types of woodlands in Europe. It also grows under the shade of hedgerows and scrub. It has a preference for moderately shady to densely shady habitats. It is able to colonise new deciduous woods on dry, calcareous soils at an annual rate of a metre or more. Under such conditions, the plants, especially the females, often display a darker green colour. Its period of reproductive activity depends upon a number of factors such as illumination, soil reaction, soil moisture, etc. These factors also affect the duration of reproductive activity.

Dog's mercury favours alkaline (basic) soils and can be found in abundance in suitable habitats in limestone regions. It also occurs widely on neutral soils but is absent from acidic ones. Spreading by underground rhizomes, where its dense growth may shade out other woodland flowers such as oxlip, fly orchid, and even young ash seedlings, but in the open, it eventually gives way to other plants.

Mercurialis perennis extends from sea level to the mountain range. The ultimate height attained in different mountainous regions, e.g. in Scotland, England, Germany, and Switzerland, naturally varies with the latitude and other geographical factors. Existing colonies in some parts of Britain (including some in woods on boulder clay in East Anglia), are expanding and showing increased vigour, perhaps as a result of deeper shade in woodlands where coppicing has ceased.

There are separate male and female plants (the species is dioecious). The plants are born at the base of the leaves similar to nettles. The flower spikes (about 25–40 mm or 1–1 1/2 in long) appear between February and May. The catkin-like male flowers are yellow (due to yellow stamens) and female flowers have 3 tepals (petals and sepals are combined or indistinguishable).

== Names ==
The plant's common name derives from the plant's resemblance to the unrelated Chenopodium bonus-henricus (Good King Henry, also known as mercury, markry, markery, Lincolnshire spinach). Since Mercurialis perennis is highly poisonous, it was named "dog's" mercury (in the sense of "false" or "bad"). It has also been known as boggard posy.

== Taxonomy ==
The genus Mercurialis belongs to the family Euphorbiaceae and to the subfamily Crotonoideae. It is included in the tribe Acalyphae, which is characterised by clusters of flowers It is also characterised by the lack of any laticiferous tissue, in the place of which tanniniferous cells (or tissue) are sometimes found.

According to Pax (1914), there are three other genera related to Mercurialis; Seidelia, Leidesia and Dysopsis. The differences between these are based on the characteristics of the calyx and stamens.

The genus Mercurialis itself consists of nine species and the main taxonomic characteristics used in distinguishing them are the clusters of floration, the annual or perennial habit, and the glabrous or hairy condition of the vegetative organs, but chiefly the ovary and the capsule, the woody or herbaceous nature of the plant, and lastly the character of the lamina.

== Plant community ==
Dog's mercury is one of the characteristic plants of several woodland types, in particular:

- W8 Fraxinus excelsior - Acer campestre - Mercurialis perennis woodland
- W9 Fraxinus excelsior - Sorbus aucuparia - Mercurialis perennis woodland
- W12 Fagus sylvatica - Mercurialis perennis woodland

== Chemical characteristics ==
All parts of dog's mercury are highly poisonous. Methylamine (mercurialine) and trimethylamine are thought to be present, together with a volatile basic oil, mercurialine, and saponins. The scent of the plant is often described as 'foetid' due to the presence of trimethylamine which often gives off a rotting fish smell. Mercurialine is thought to be one of the active principal parts that are responsible for the toxicity of the herb. It is known to induce hemorrhagic inflammation of the gastrointestinal tract and kidneys. There is apparently some narcotic action, which induces drowsiness, and mild muscular spasms.

One suggested mechanism of toxicity was discovered in the 1900s. A researcher induced toxicity with dog's mercury, frozen at different stages of growth and fed it to sheep. Based on this experiment, these effects may be due to different toxic factors that are developed at different growth stages. Another hypothesis is that one toxin might be culpable for the symptoms and illness.

Saponin

Methylamine

Trimethylamine

=== Symptoms of poisoning ===
Symptoms of poisoning appear within a few hours; they can include vomiting, pain, gastric and kidney inflammation, and sometimes inflammation of the cheeks and jaw ("malar erythema") and drowsiness. Larger doses cause lethargy, jaundice, painful urination, apparently by making the urine acid, and coma before death.

=== Reported cases of poisonings ===
The first-known account of this phenomenon probably dates from 1693, when a family of five became seriously ill as a result of eating the plant (after boiling and frying it); one of the children died some days later as a result.

Apart from Chenopodium bonus-henricus and some other edible members of the Chenopodiaceae (also known as mercuries), the most similar-looking species is probably Mercurialis annua, annual mercury, which is also thought to be poisonous. Dog's mercury has been eaten in mistake for brooklime.

In 1983, a couple was reported of having eaten a large quantity of leaves after washing and boiling the plant after mistaking it for brooklime. Both patients were hospitalised complaining of nausea, vomiting, and severe bilateral colicky loin pain and present signs of malar erythema but no signs of cardiovascular/respiratory disorders. They presented signs similar to an allergic reaction. They suffered severe gastrointestinal complications which led to dehydration. Once the toxin was identified, they were given sodium bicarbonate four times a day to neutralise the acidity of the urine. They recovered after two days of rest and continuous observation and monitoring.

An outbreak of fatal mercurialis poisoning in the Welsh mountain ewes was reported which included hemolytic anemia without marrow suppression and acute oedematous gastroenteritis with hepatic centrilobular necrosis.

== Uses ==
The dog's mercury is poisonous by itself but with a thorough drying/heating, one is able to destroy its poisonous quality. The juice of the plant is emetic, ophthalmic and purgative. It can be used externally to treat menstrual pain, ear, and eye problems, warts, and sores. A lotion can be made from the plant for antiseptic external dressing due to its ability to soften and moisturise the skin.

A fine blue dye can be obtained from the leaves although it is able to be turned red by acids and destroyed by alkalis. It is often permanent and colouration is similar to indigo. A yellow dye can be obtained from the leaves. The seeds are also a good source of drying oil.
