= Mareya =

Scientific classification
- Kingdom: Plantae
- Clade: Embryophytes
- Clade: Tracheophytes
- Clade: Spermatophytes
- Clade: Angiosperms
- Clade: Eudicots
- Clade: Rosids
- Order: Malpighiales
- Family: Euphorbiaceae
- Subfamily: Acalyphoideae
- Tribe: Acalypheae
- Subtribe: Mareyinae
- Genus: Mareya; Baill.

Type species
- Mareya spicata Baill.

Genus of flowering plants

Mareya is a plant genus of the family Euphorbiaceae, first described as a genus in 1860. It is native to tropical western and central Africa.

Uses

Mareya micrantha is said to have local anaesthetic properties. It is also used as an abortifacient.

Species

1. Mareya aristata Prain - Gabon
2. Mareya brevipes Pax - Cameroon, Gabon, Congo-Brazzaville, Equatorial Guinea, Zaïre, Central African Republic, Uganda
3. Mareya congolensis (J.Léonard) J.Léonard - Zaïre
4. Mareya micrantha (Benth.) Müll.Arg. (syn M. spicata) - widespread from Liberia to Zaire

formerly included

transferred to Mareyopsis

- Mareya longifolia Pax - Mareyopsis longifolia (Pax) Pax & K.Hoffm.
