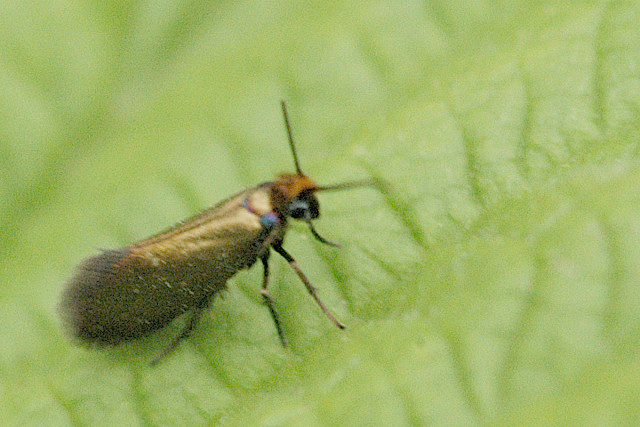

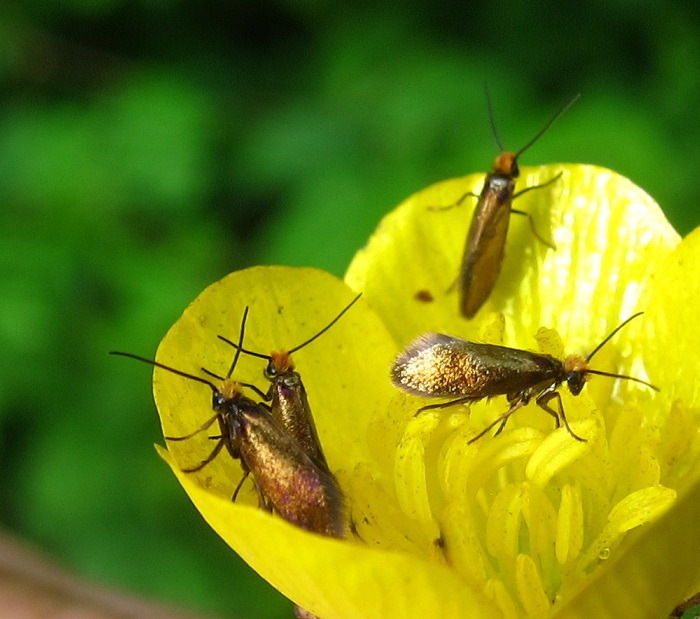

Scientific classification
- Kingdom: Animalia
- Phylum: Arthropoda
- Class: Insecta
- Order: Lepidoptera
- Family: Micropterigidae
- Genus: Micropterix
- Species: M. calthella

Binomial name
- Micropterix calthella (Linnaeus, 1761)

Synonyms
- List: Phalaena (Tinea) calthella Linnaeus, 1761; Tinea urticella Costa, 1834; Eriocephala sulcatella Bentley, 1845; Micropteryx silesiaca Toll, 1942; Tinea pusilella Hübner, 1813; Micropterix pusilella (Hübner, 1813)

= Micropterix calthella =

Moth species in family Micropterigidae

Micropterix calthella, the marsh marigold moth, is a species of moth belonging to the family Micropterigidae. It is found in damp habitats throughout Europe (except for the far south) and is also distributed eastwards to central Siberia. It was first described by Carl Linnaeus in 1761 as Phalaena calthella.

== Description ==
Pupae are brown with dark oculi and paler abdominal segments. Adults are small, with a forewing length of up to 4.6 millimetres (0.18 in) and a wingspan of 8–10 millimetres (0.31–0.39 in). The species is more plainly marked than many other European species of Micropterix, and has dark bronze-coloured (or pale shining bronzy-golden) forewings with a purple sheen in places and distinctive purple bases. The hindwings are rather dark bronzy-grey. The head is deep ferruginous-yellow.

== Behaviour ==
Eggs are laid amongst vegetation on the soil surface. They are translucent white turning grey, prior to hatching. The larvae feed on tender, young growth of herbacaeous plants and pupate in a tough, silken cocoon.

Like other members of the family, Micropterix calthella has functional jaws in its imaginal stage. As adult, it feeds on pollen grains from a wide variety of plants such as maple (Acer species), bugle (Ajuga species), Caltha, Cardamine, sedge (Carex species), hawthorn (Crataegus species), mercuries (Mercurialis species) and buttercup (Ranunculus species). The adults possess sociable behavior.

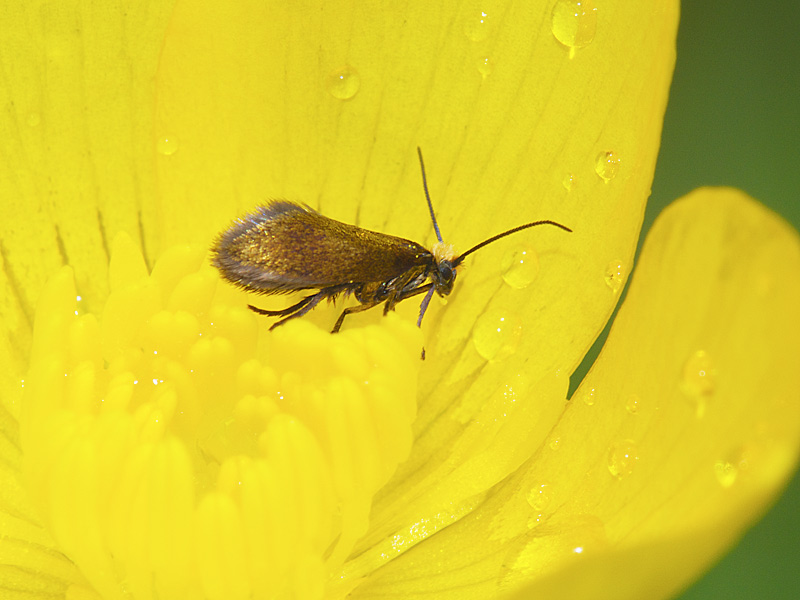
Lissan House, Cookstown, Northern Ireland; feeding on pollen of Ranunculus repens.

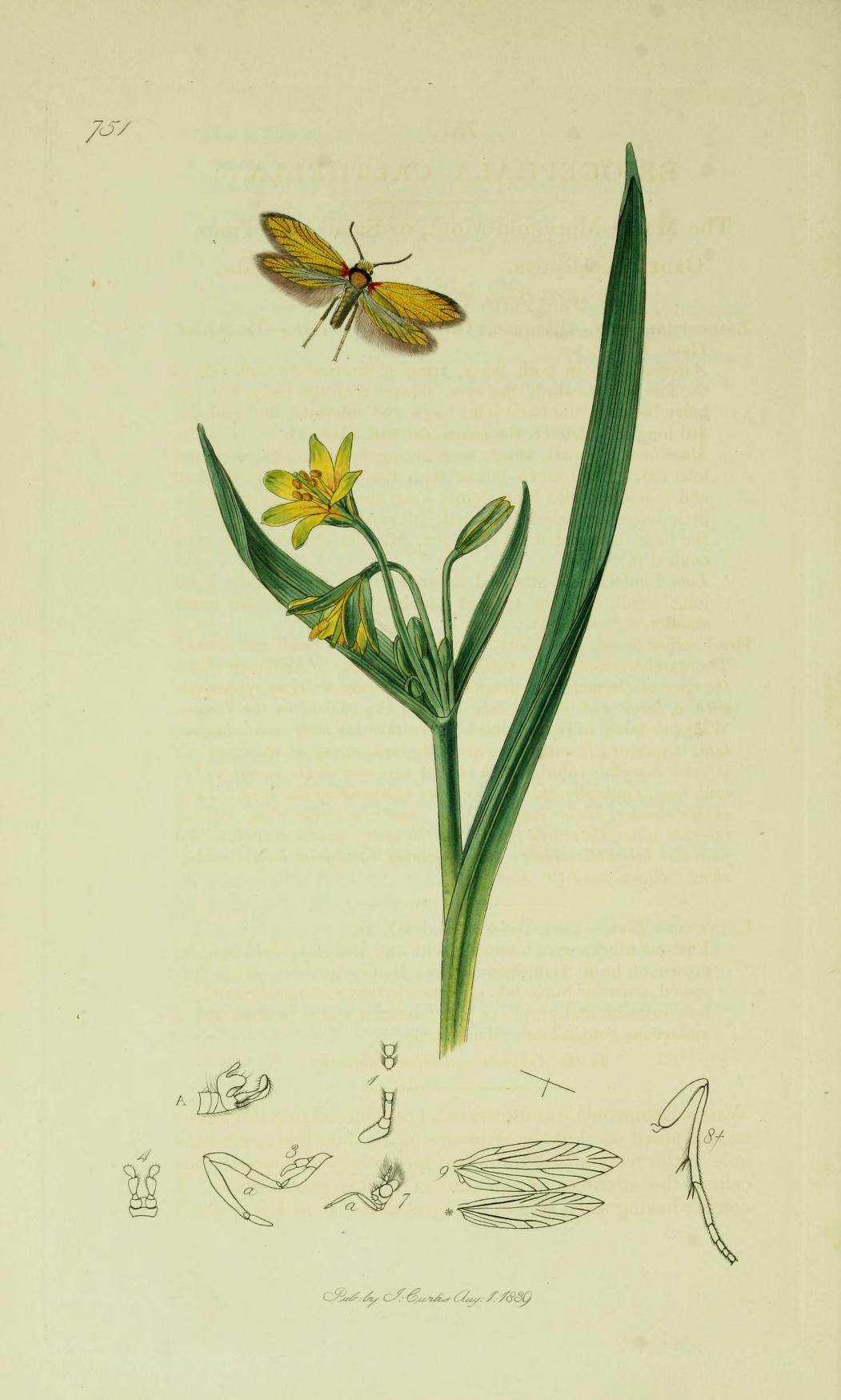
Illustration from John Curtis's British Entomology Volume 6

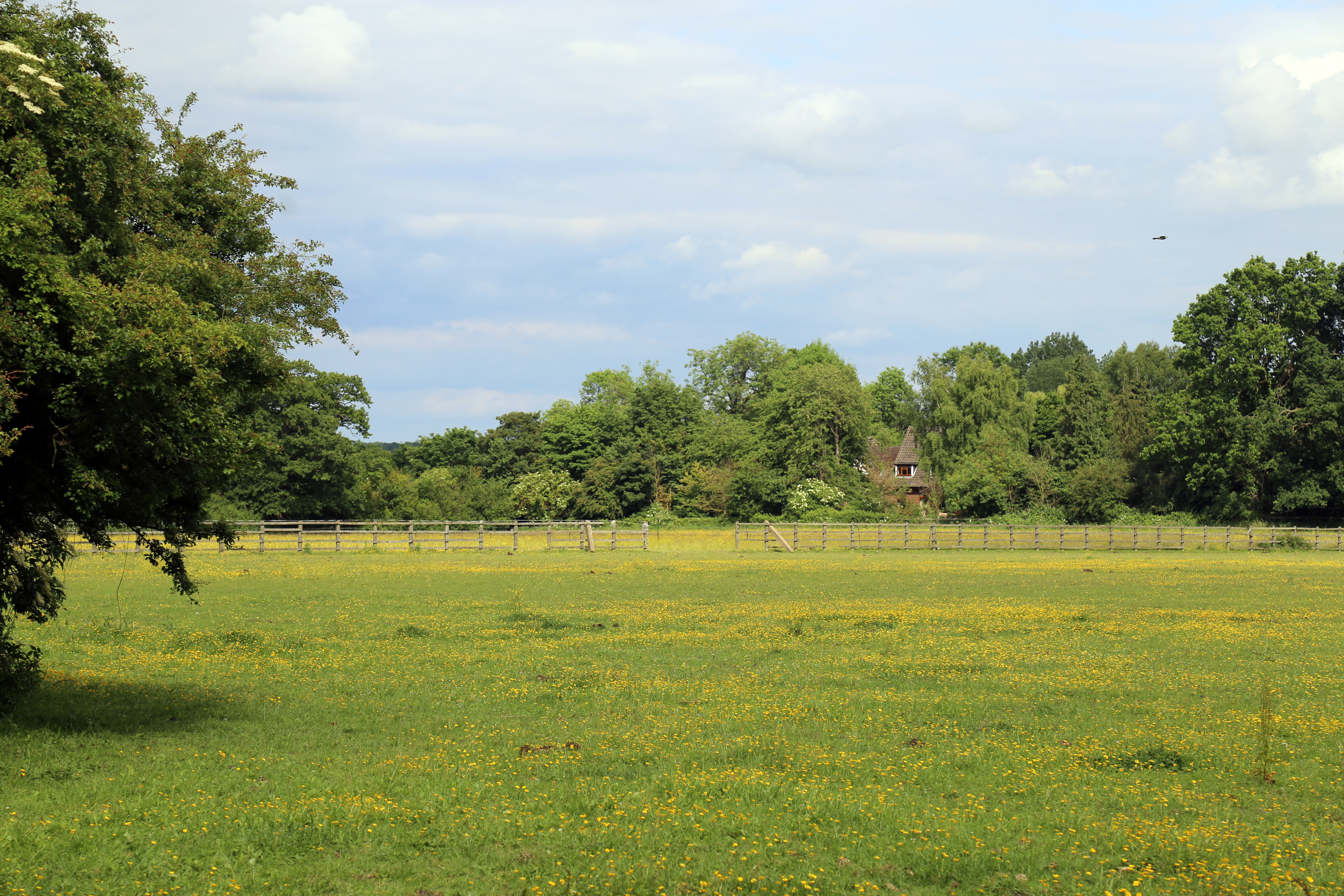
Meadow habitat, England

== Taxonomy ==
The moth was first named by Carl Linnaeus in 1761 as Phalaena calthella, from a specimen found in Sweden. The generic name Phalaena is from the Greek language and has a number of possible meanings. It may mean the rest of the moths; or possibly a devouring monster or whale, which may be derived from the destructive properties of clothes moths; or possibly from phallus an association by the Greeks of lepidoptera and semen, which was supposed to attract moths; or paros i.e. a light and the attraction of moths to lights. The specific name calthella, is named after the marsh marigold (Caltha palustris); the moth can be found feeding on its pollen. Later the moth was renamed as Micropterix calthella, with the genus raised by the German entomologist, Jacob Hübner in 1825. It comes from the Greek for mikros – little, and pterux – a wing.
