= Spathiostemon =

Scientific classification
- Kingdom: Plantae
- Clade: Tracheophytes
- Clade: Angiosperms
- Clade: Eudicots
- Clade: Rosids
- Order: Malpighiales
- Family: Euphorbiaceae
- Subfamily: Acalyphoideae
- Tribe: Acalypheae
- Subtribe: Lasiococcinae
- Genus: Spathiostemon; Blume

Type species
- Spathiostemon javensis Blume

Synonyms
- Polydragma Hook.f.

Genus of trees

Spathiostemon is a genus of trees in the Euphorbiaceae family. It is native to the Bismarck Archipelago, New Guinea, Wallacea and Southeast Asia. The trees grow between 10 and 20m tall, often in secondary forest. The wood is sometimes used.

== Description ==
The two species occur as trees or shrubs up to 20m tall. They are monoecious, that is individual trees have both female and male flowers though the sexes flower at different times. Leaves are spirally arranged and simple in form, papery. Flowers do not have petals. Woody thin-walled capsules are slightly lobed, glabrous (hairless) and either smooth or spiny. There are usually 2-3 seeds per fruit, obovoid (rounded at both ends), and slightly triangular in cross/transverse section. The genus is distinguished from other Malesian Euphorbiaceae by the following traits: if present the latex is not obvious; hairs are present; pistillate (female) flowers have apically split stigmas; the male (staminate) flowers have stamens that split into two equal branches, arising from 4‒7 androphores/stalks, with ultimately more than 100 stamens.

== History ==
Carl Ludwig Blume, botanist, was born in Braunschweig, but mainly worked in the Netherlands and the Netherlands East Indies. He first described Spathiostemon as a genus in 1826 in the journal Bijdragen tot de Flora van Nederlandsch Indie.

== Species ==
- Spathiostemon javensis Blume - Bismarck Archipelago, New Guinea, Maluku, Lesser Sunda Islands, Sulawesi, Philippines, Jawa, Borneo, and Peninsular Malaysia
- Spathiostemon moniliformis Airy Shaw - Southern Thailand

== Formerly included ==
- Spathiostemon forbesii (S.Moore) Airy Shaw - Clonostylis forbesii S.Moore
- Spathiostemon salicinus (Hassk.) Hassk. - Homonoia riparia Lour.
