= Spathiostemon moniliformis =

Scientific classification
- Kingdom: Plantae
- Clade: Embryophytes
- Clade: Tracheophytes
- Clade: Angiosperms
- Clade: Eudicots
- Clade: Rosids
- Order: Malpighiales
- Family: Euphorbiaceae
- Genus: Spathiostemon
- Species: S. moniliformis

Binomial name
- Spathiostemon moniliformis Airy Shaw

Species of plant endemic to Thailand

Spathiostemon moniliformis is a plant that can grow as a shrub or a tree in the Euphorbiaceae family, Acalypheae tribe. It is endemic to southern/peninsular Thailand.

== Description ==
The species grows as a shrub or tree, in height up to 10 m (33 ft), with a trunk diameter at breast height up to 11 cm (4.3 in). Leaves are rarely ovate tending usually to elliptic, some 6.2-26.5 x 2.3-9.5 cm in size, on both sides they are smooth and glabrous. Flowers are white to yellowish. The fruit is reddish to dark brown, smooth and glabrous, some 9 x 6mm in size. It flowers and fruits from December to March, August to September.

The species is distinguished from its sister taxa Spathiostemon javensis by the following traits: Glabrous petioles; the leaves do not have domatia; the inflorescences are glabrous, and the staminate inflorescences are from 6 to 28 cm (2.4 to 11.0 in) long; the pistillate flowers have sepals in 2 whorls of 3; the ovary and fruit are smooth.

The taxa is distinguished from other Euphorbiaceae growing in Thailand by having: elliptic leaves whose basal margin has 3 black dot-like glands on either side of the midrib; the petioles are both basally and apically pulvinate; seeds do not have arilloid.

== Habitat, ecology ==
The shrub/tree is common in evergreen forest and in secondary forests that have evergreen patches. It grows from 10 to 200m altitude.

== Distribution ==
The tree is endemic to southern/peninsular Thailand.

== Vernacular names ==
Kha khao and khan laen are names used for this species in Surat Thani Province, Thailand.

== History ==
The English botanist Herbert Kenneth Airy Shaw, who worked extensively on tropical Asian botany and entomology, described the species in 1962, in the Kew Bulletin.
