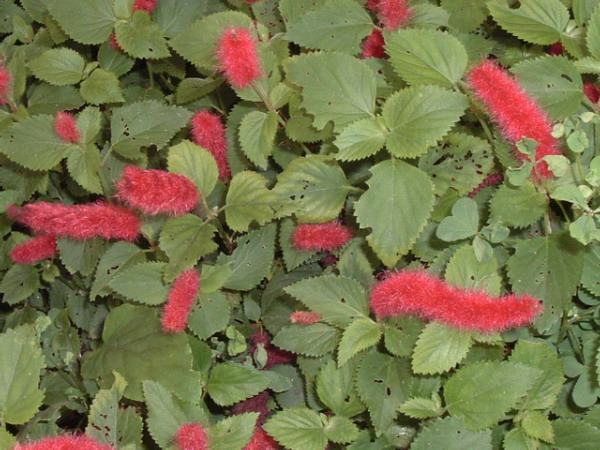
- Acalypha reptans

Scientific classification
- Kingdom: Plantae
- Clade: Tracheophytes
- Clade: Angiosperms
- Clade: Eudicots
- Clade: Rosids
- Order: Malpighiales
- Family: Euphorbiaceae
- Subfamily: Acalyphoideae
- Tribe: Acalypheae; Dumort., 1829

Subtribes
- Acalyphinae; Adrianinae; Claoxylinae; Cleidiinae; Dysopsidinae; Lasiococcinae; Lobaniliinae; Macaranginae; Mareyinae; Mercurialinae; Ricininae; Rottlerinae

= Acalypheae =

Acalypheae Temporal range: Eocene - recent

Tribe of flowering plants

The Acalypheae is a tribe of the subfamily Acalyphoideae, under the family Euphorbiaceae. It comprises 12 subtribes and about 30 genera. One of the most well-known plants in this tribe is Ricinus, the castor bean, or castor oil plant.

== Genera ==
Subtribe Acalyphinae

- Acalypha L.

Subtribe Adrianinae

- Adriana Gaudich.

Subtribe Claoxylinae

- Claoxylon A.Juss.
- Claoxylopsis
- Discoclaoxylon
- Erythrococca
- Micrococca

Subtribe Cleidiinae

- Cleidion Blume
- Sampantaea
- Wetria

Subtribe Dysopsidinae

- Dysopsis Baill.

Subtribe Lasiococcinae

- Clonostylis
- Homonoia
- Lasiococca
- Spathiostemon

Subtribe Lobaniliinae

- Lobanilia

Subtribe Macaranginae

- Macaranga Thouars

Subtribe Mareyinae

- Mareya Baill.
- Mareyopsis

Subtribe Mercurialinae

- Mercurialis L.
- Leidesia
- Seidelia

Subtribe Ricininae

- Ricinus L.

Subtribe Rottlerinae

- Avellanita
- Hancea
- Mallotus
- Rockinghamia

== See also ==
- Taxonomy of the Euphorbiaceae
