= Horningtoft Wood =

Protected area in Norfolk, England

Coordinates: 52.776°N 0.887°E

- Site of Special Scientific Interest
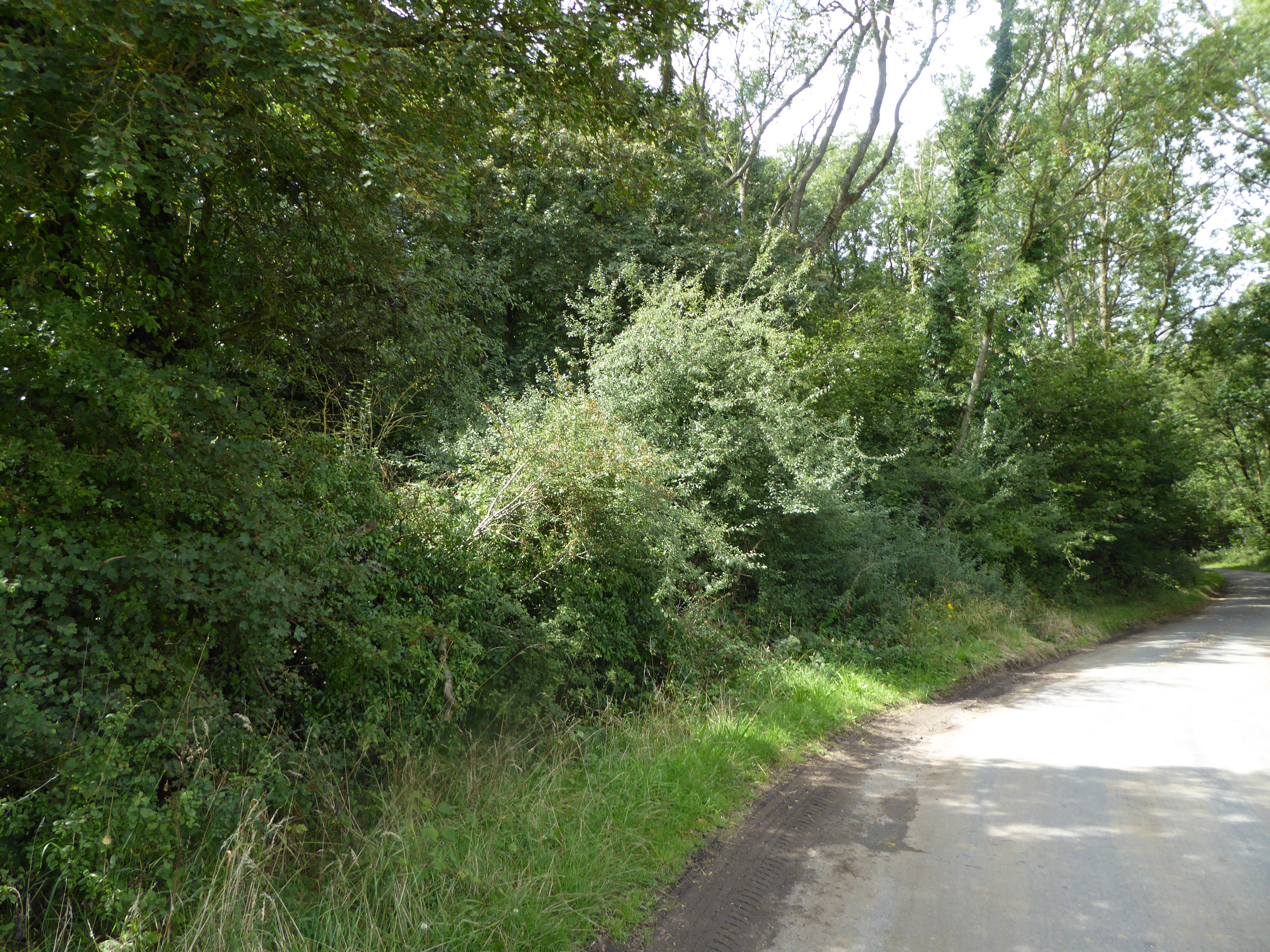
- Location of Horningtoft Wood.
- Area of search: Norfolk
- Grid reference: TF 948 237
- Interest: Biological
- Area: 8.3 hectares (21 acres)
- Notification date: 1985
- Location map: Magic Map

Horningtoft Wood is a 8.3-hectare (21-acre) biological Site of Special Scientific Interest south of Fakenham in Norfolk, England.

This ancient coppice with standards wood on boulder clay has exceptionally diverse ground flora with several rare species. There are scattered mature oaks and the main coppiced species are hazel, ash and maple. The ground flora is dominated by dog's mercury on heavy soils and bramble on lighter ones.

The site is private land with no public access.
