= Euphorbia analalavensis =

Conservation status
- Least Concern (IUCN 3.1)

Scientific classification
- Kingdom: Plantae
- Clade: Tracheophytes
- Clade: Angiosperms
- Clade: Eudicots
- Clade: Rosids
- Order: Malpighiales
- Family: Euphorbiaceae
- Genus: Euphorbia
- Species: E. analalavensis

Binomial name
- Euphorbia analalavensis Leandri

Species of flowering plant

Euphorbia analalavensis is a species of plant in the family Euphorbiaceae. It is native to northern and western Madagascar and the Comoro Islands. Its natural habitat is dry deciduous forest and rocky areas between 50 and 400 meters elevation. It is threatened by habitat loss.

As most other succulent members of the genus Euphorbia, its trade is regulated under Appendix II of CITES.
