= Claoxylopsis =

Scientific classification
- Kingdom: Plantae
- Clade: Tracheophytes
- Clade: Angiosperms
- Clade: Eudicots
- Clade: Rosids
- Order: Malpighiales
- Family: Euphorbiaceae
- Subfamily: Acalyphoideae
- Tribe: Acalypheae
- Subtribe: Claoxylinae
- Genus: Claoxylopsis; Leandri

Type species
- Claoxylopsis perrieri Leandri

Genus of flowering plants

Claoxylopsis is a plant genus of the family Euphorbiaceae, first described as a genus in 1939. The entire genus is endemic to Madagascar.

Species

1. Claoxylopsis andapensis Radcl.-Sm.
2. Claoxylopsis perrieri Leandri
3. Claoxylopsis purpurascens Radcl.-Sm.
