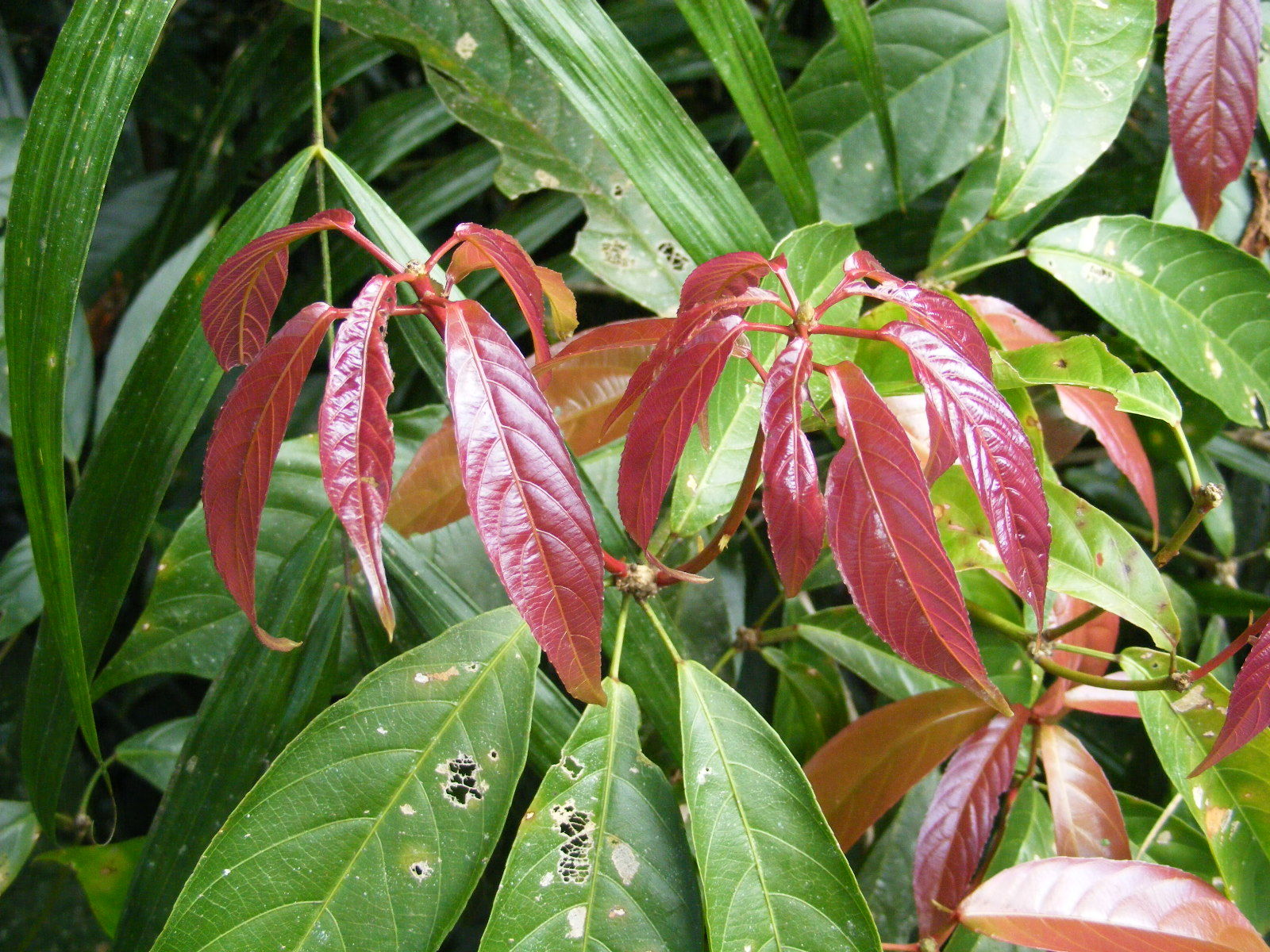
- New foliage

Conservation status
- Least Concern (IUCN 3.1)

Scientific classification
- Kingdom: Plantae
- Clade: Tracheophytes
- Clade: Angiosperms
- Clade: Eudicots
- Clade: Rosids
- Order: Malpighiales
- Family: Euphorbiaceae
- Genus: Rockinghamia
- Species: R. angustifolia

Binomial name
- Rockinghamia angustifolia Benth.

Synonyms
- Mallotus angustifolius Benth.

= Rockinghamia angustifolia =

Mountain kamala

Species of flowering plant

Rockinghamia angustifolia, commonly known as mountain kamala, is a species of plant in the family Euphorbiaceae. It was first described in 1873 and is native to the rainforests of eastern Queensland, Australia.

== Description ==
Rockinghamia angustifolia is an understorey tree reaching up to 20 m (66 ft) tall with a trunk diameter of up to 45 cm (18 in). The trunk may be fluted or buttressed. Leaves are simple and clustered towards the ends of the branches and are held on petioles (leaf stalk) up to 7 cm (2.8 in) long. They measure up to 25 cm (9.8 in) long by 9 cm (3.5 in) wide and have 7–10 lateral veins. The petiole has a pulvinus at either end.

The inflorescence is a panicle up to 14 cm (5.5 in) long and comprises both male and female flowers. The pink or red flowers have sepals about 2–5 mm (0.08–0.20 in) long but do not have petals. The fruit is a three-lobed, red, pink or green capsule about 15 mm (0.6 in) long and 19 mm (0.7 in) wide, containing up to eight roughly spherical seeds about 7 mm (0.3 in) long.

== Taxonomy ==
This plant was first described in 1873 as Mallotus angustifolius by English botanist George Bentham. In 1966, Herbert Kenneth Airy Shaw reviewed the material on which Bentham's description was based and concluded that it did not belong in the genus Mallotus, and he created the new genus Rockinghamia to accommodate the species.

=== Etymology ===
The genus name Rockinghamia is for Rockingham Bay, the area where the type specimen was collected. The species epithet angustifolia is derived from the Latin words angustus, 'narrow', and folium, leaf.

== Distribution and habitat ==
Rockinghamia angustifolia inhabits rainforest of eastern Queensland, Australia, and occurs in two distinct populations. The northern population extends from about Rossville to Paluma Range National Park, and the southern population is in the area around Eungella National Park west of Mackay. The altitudinal range is from sea level to about 1,400 m (4,600 ft).

== Ecology ==
The seeds of this species are eaten by Australian king parrots (Alisterus scapularis).

== Conservation ==
As of July 2025, this species has been assessed to be of least concern by the International Union for Conservation of Nature (IUCN) and by the Queensland Government under its Nature Conservation Act.

== Gallery ==
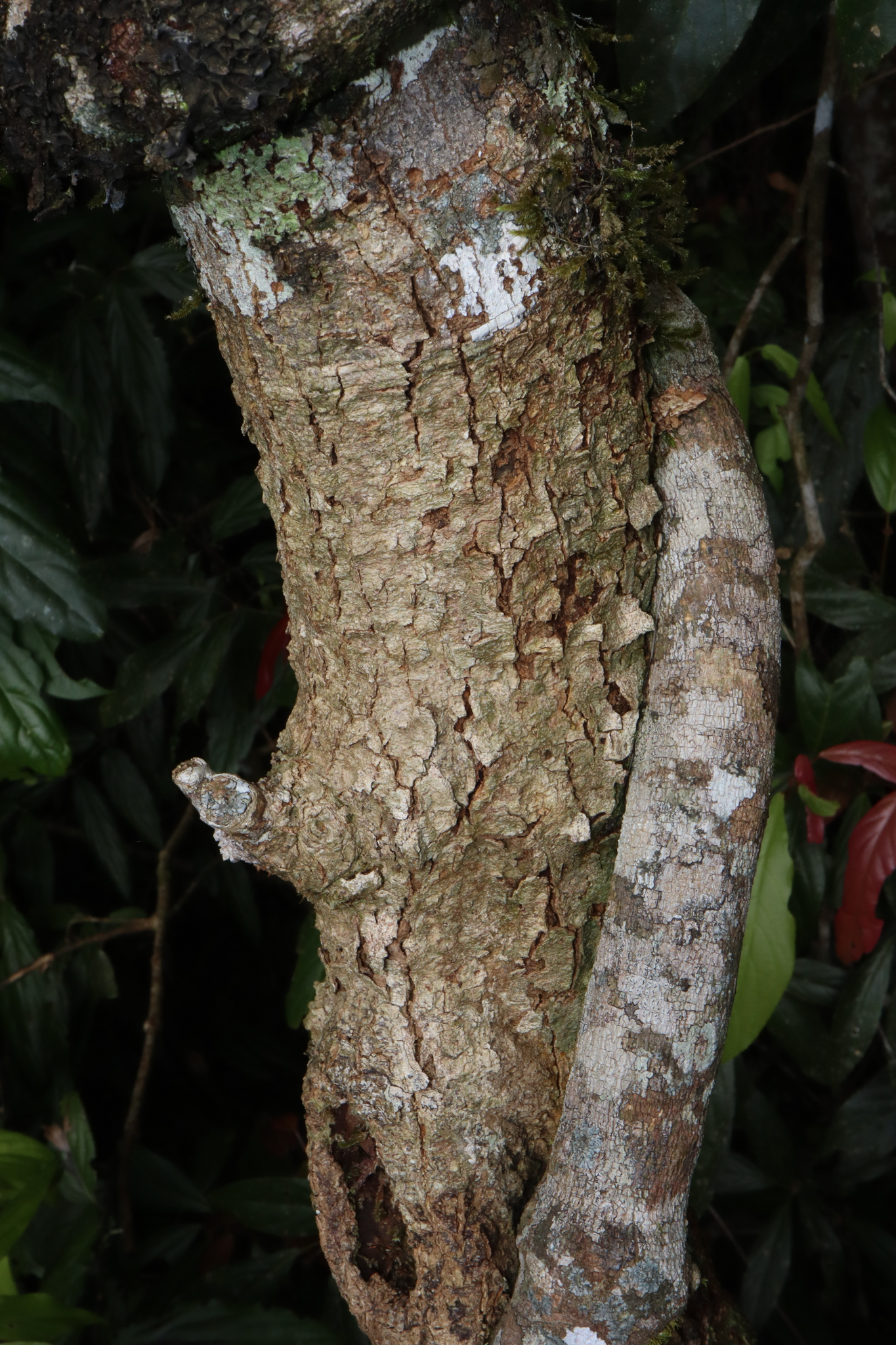
Trunk

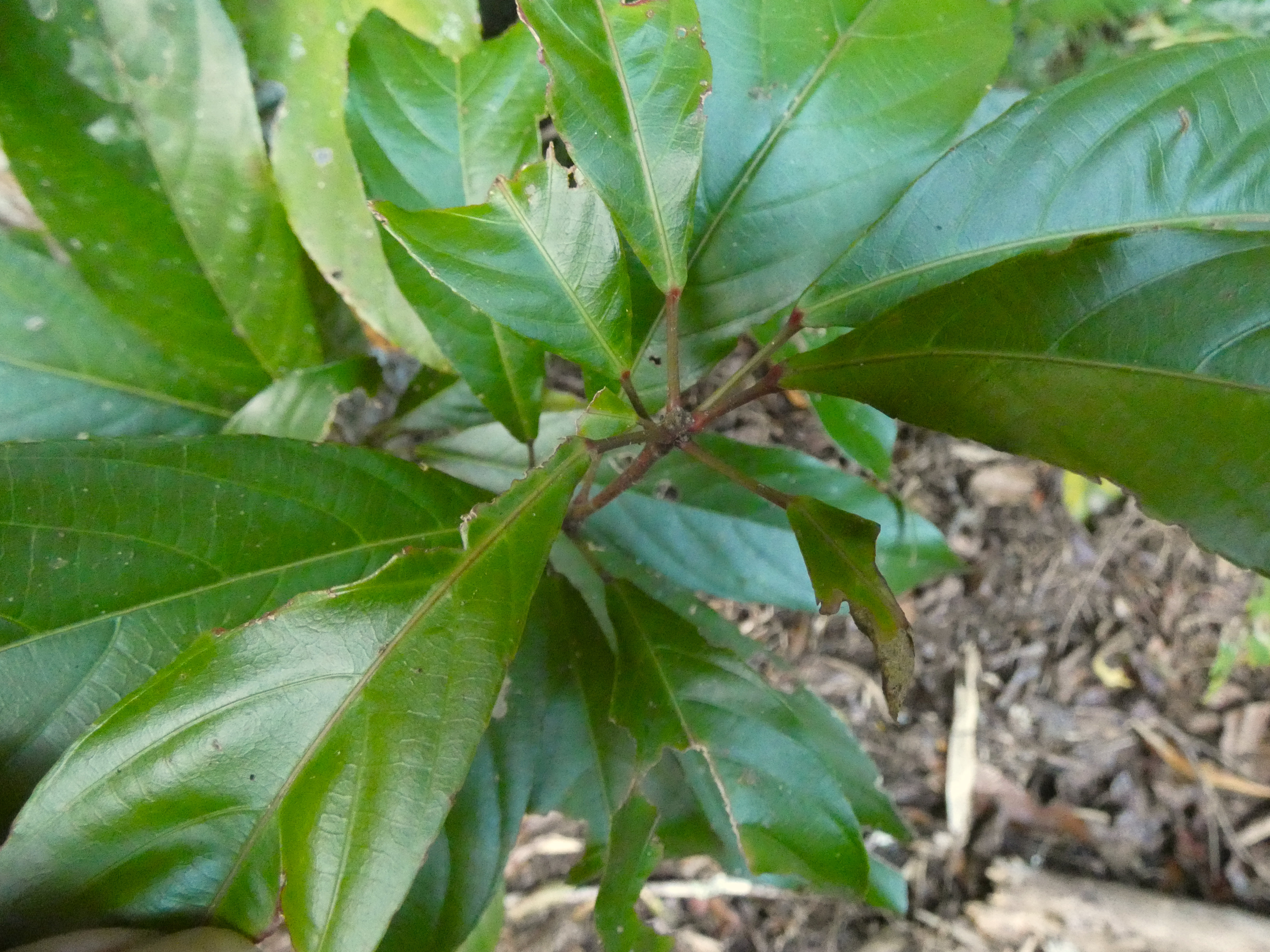
Foliage

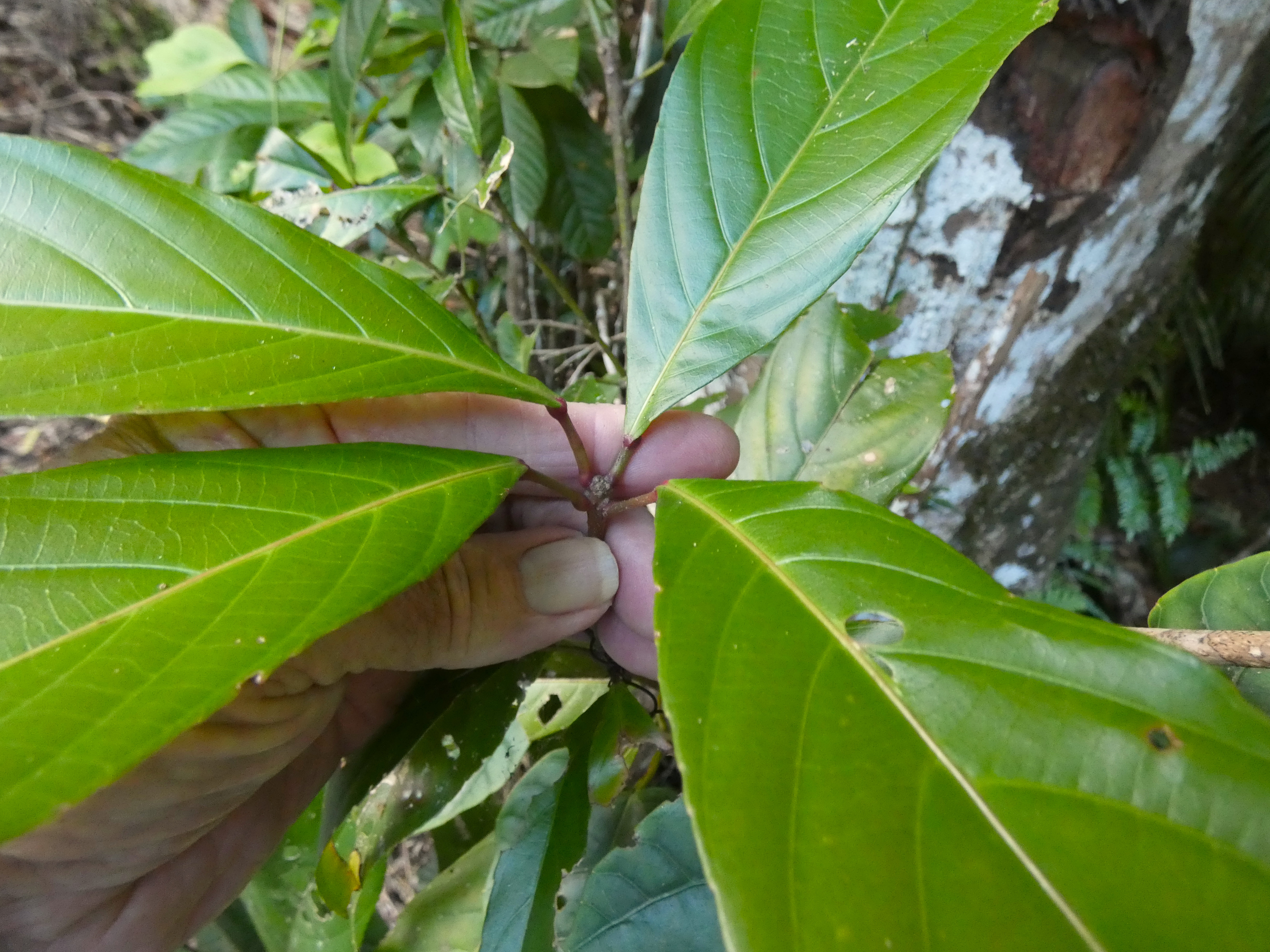
Pseudo-whorled leaves

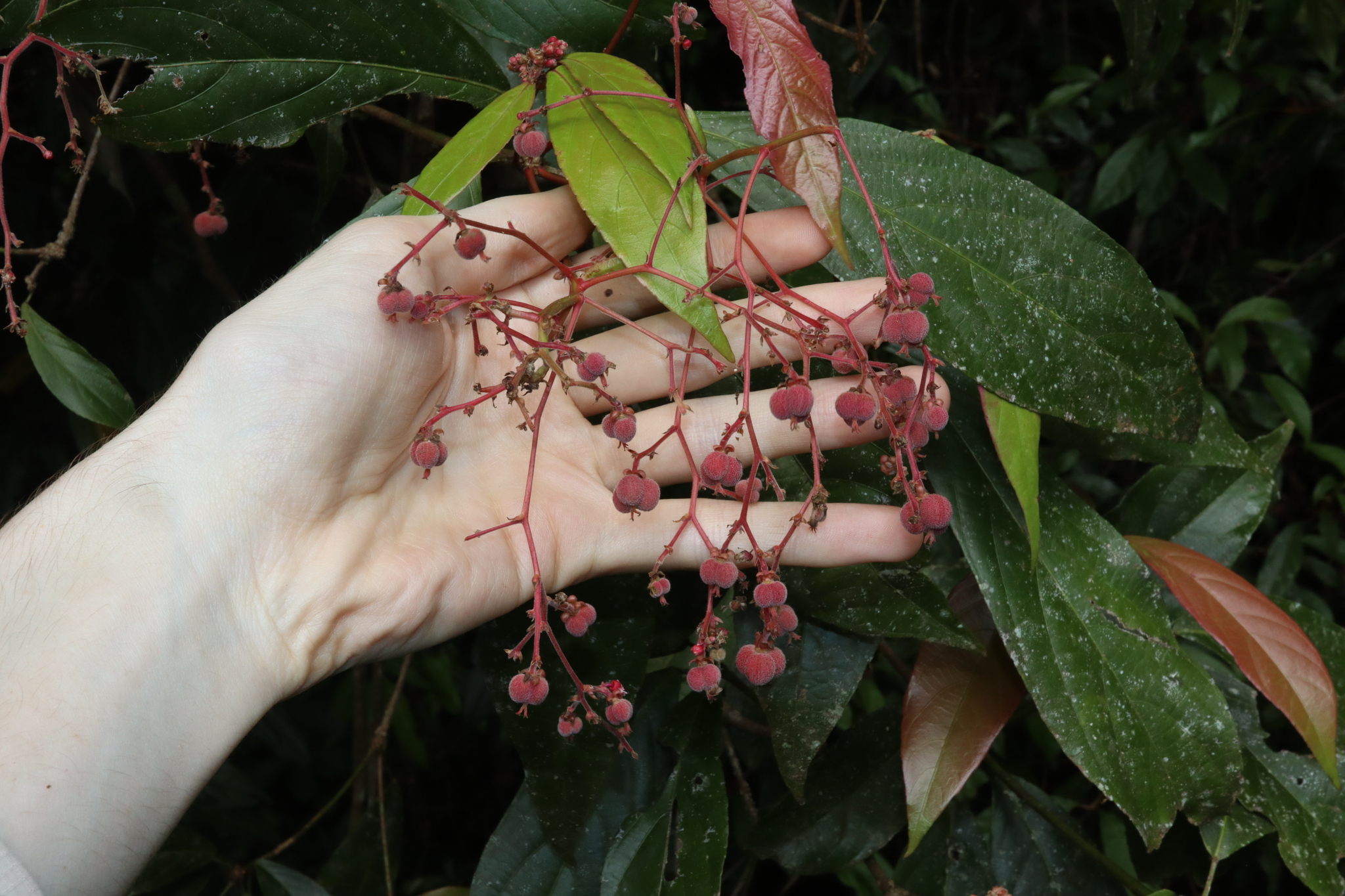
Fruit
