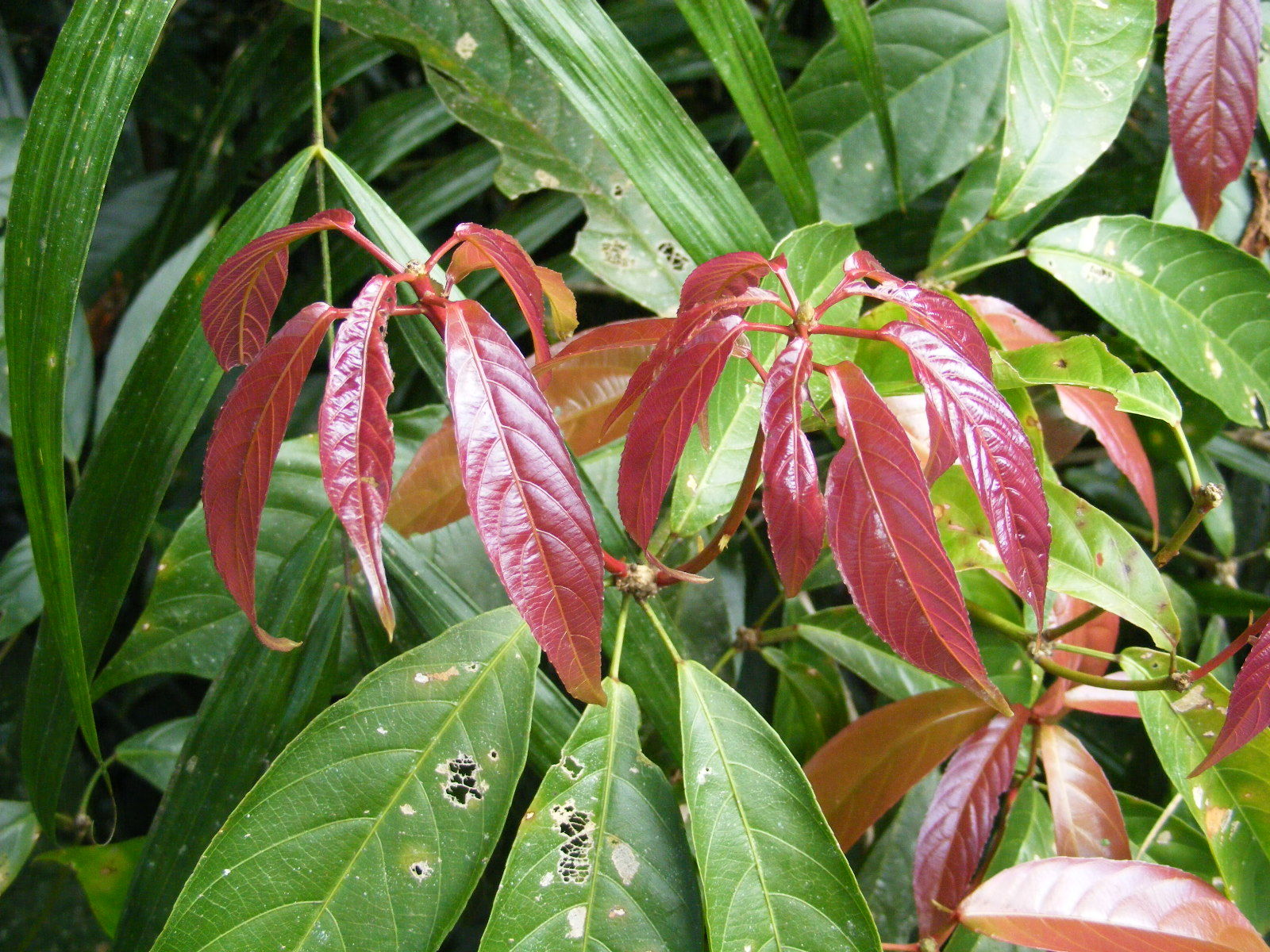
- Rockinghamia angustifolia

Scientific classification
- Kingdom: Plantae
- Clade: Tracheophytes
- Clade: Angiosperms
- Clade: Eudicots
- Clade: Rosids
- Order: Malpighiales
- Family: Euphorbiaceae
- Subfamily: Acalyphoideae
- Tribe: Acalypheae
- Subtribe: Rottlerinae
- Genus: Rockinghamia; Airy Shaw

Type species
- Rockinghamia angustifolia (Benth.) Airy Shaw

= Rockinghamia =

Genus of flowering plants

Rockinghamia is a genus of plants in the spurge family Euphorbiaceae, first described as a genus in 1966. It contains only two species, both of which are endemic to the state of Queensland in Australia.

== Species ==
As of July 2025, Plants of the World Online accepts the following two species:

- Rockinghamia angustifolia (Benth.) Airy Shaw
- Rockinghamia brevipes Airy Shaw
