= Leandriella =

Scientific classification
- Kingdom: Plantae
- Clade: Tracheophytes
- Clade: Angiosperms
- Clade: Eudicots
- Clade: Asterids
- Order: Lamiales
- Family: Acanthaceae
- Genus: Leandriella; Benoist

Genus of plants

Leandriella is a genus of flowering plants belonging to the family Acanthaceae.

It is native to Madagascar.

The genus name of Leandriella is in honour of Jacques Désiré Leandri (1903–1982), a French botanist and mycologist. It was first described and published in Notul. Syst. (Paris) Vol.8 on page 155 in 1939.

Species, according to Kew:

- Leandriella oblonga Benoist
- Leandriella valvata Benoist
