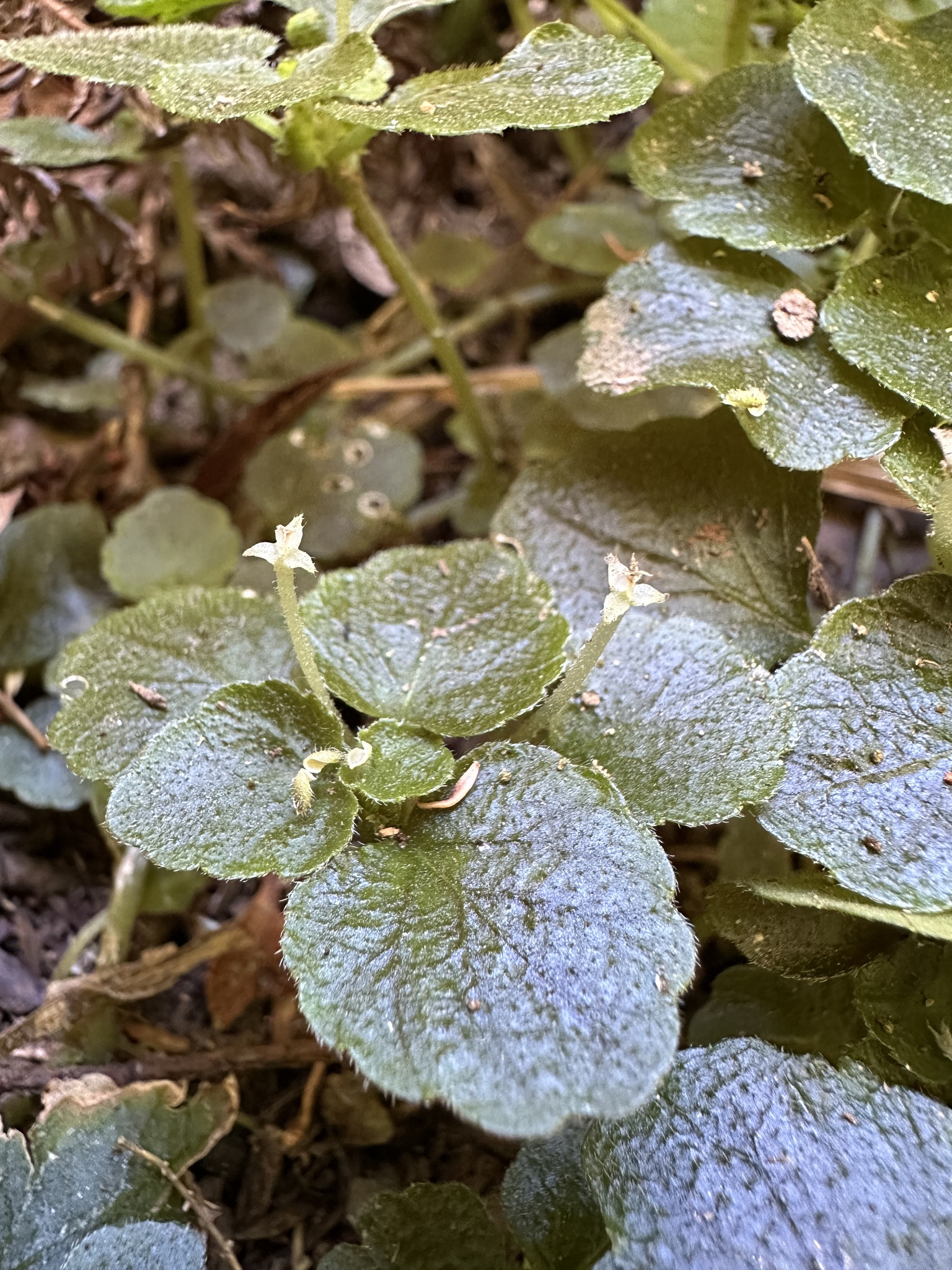

Scientific classification
- Kingdom: Plantae
- Clade: Tracheophytes
- Clade: Angiosperms
- Clade: Eudicots
- Clade: Rosids
- Order: Malpighiales
- Family: Euphorbiaceae
- Genus: Dysopsis
- Species: D. glechomoides

Binomial name
- Dysopsis glechomoides (A.Rich.) Müll.Arg.

Synonyms
- Hydrocotyle glechomoides A.Rich.; Dysopsis glechomoides var. genuina Müll.Arg.; Molina chilensis Gay; Dysopsis gayana Baill.

= Dysopsis glechomoides =

Species of flowering plant

Dysopsis glechomoides is a plant species of the family Euphorbiaceae. It is native to Chile and southern Argentina (Río Negro, Tierra del Fuego).
