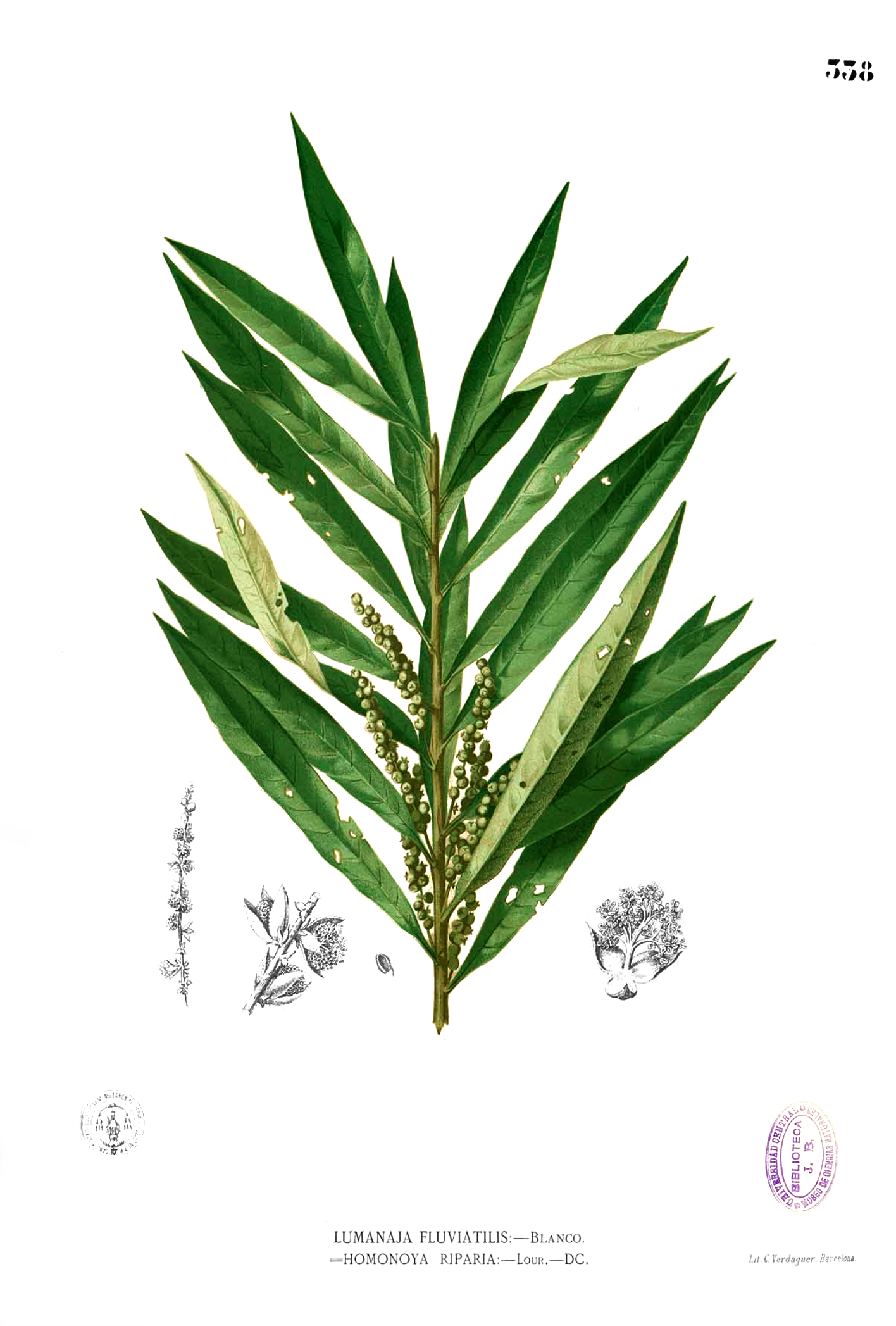
- Homonoia riparia

Scientific classification
- Kingdom: Plantae
- Clade: Tracheophytes
- Clade: Angiosperms
- Clade: Eudicots
- Clade: Rosids
- Order: Malpighiales
- Family: Euphorbiaceae
- Subtribe: Lasiococcinae
- Genus: Homonoia; Lour.

Type species
- Homonoia riparia Lour.

Synonyms
- Haematospermum Wall.; Lumanaja Blanco

= Homonoia (plant) =

Genus of flowering plants

Homonoia is a plant genus of the family Euphorbiaceae first described in 1790. These are rheophytes and usually found in groups at riverbanks in India, southern China, Southeast Asia, and New Guinea.

Species

1. Homonoia intermedia Haines - India
2. Homonoia retusa (Graham ex Wight) Müll.Arg. - India, Vietnam
3. Homonoia riparia Lour. - Guangxi, Guizhou, Hainan, Sichuan, Taiwan, Yunnan, Cambodia, India, Assam, Bhutan, Sri Lanka, Borneo, Java, Lesser Sunda Islands, Sulawesi, Sumatra, Maluku, Laos, Malaysia, Myanmar, Philippines, Thailand, Vietnam, New Guinea, Andaman & Nicobar Islands

formerly included

moved to other genera (Lasiococca Spathiostemon)

1. Homonoia comberi - Lasiococca comberi
2. Homonoia javensis - Spathiostemon javensis
3. Homonoia pseudoverticillata - Lasiococca comberi
4. Homonoia symphyllifolia - Lasiococca symphyllifolia
