= Discoclaoxylon =

Scientific classification
- Kingdom: Plantae
- Clade: Tracheophytes
- Clade: Angiosperms
- Clade: Eudicots
- Clade: Rosids
- Order: Malpighiales
- Family: Euphorbiaceae
- Subfamily: Acalyphoideae
- Tribe: Acalypheae
- Subtribe: Claoxylinae
- Genus: Discoclaoxylon (Müll.Arg.) Pax & K.Hoffm.

Genus of flowering plants

Discoclaoxylon is a plant genus of the family Euphorbiaceae, first described in 1914. It is native to western and central Africa, including islands in the Gulf of Guinea.

Species

1. Discoclaoxylon hexandrum (Müll.Arg.) Pax & K.Hoffm. - Ghana, Guinea, Ivory Coast, Sierra Leone, Nigeria, Cameroon, Gabon, Central African Republic, Equatorial Guinea, São Tomé, Republic of the Congo, Democratic Republic of the Congo, Uganda
2. Discoclaoxylon occidentale (Müll.Arg.) Pax & K.Hoffm. - São Tomé
3. Discoclaoxylon pedicellare (Müll.Arg.) Pax & K.Hoffm. - Bioko (Cameroon)
4. Discoclaoxylon pubescens (Pax & K.Hoffm.) Exell - Annobón (Equatorial Guinea)
