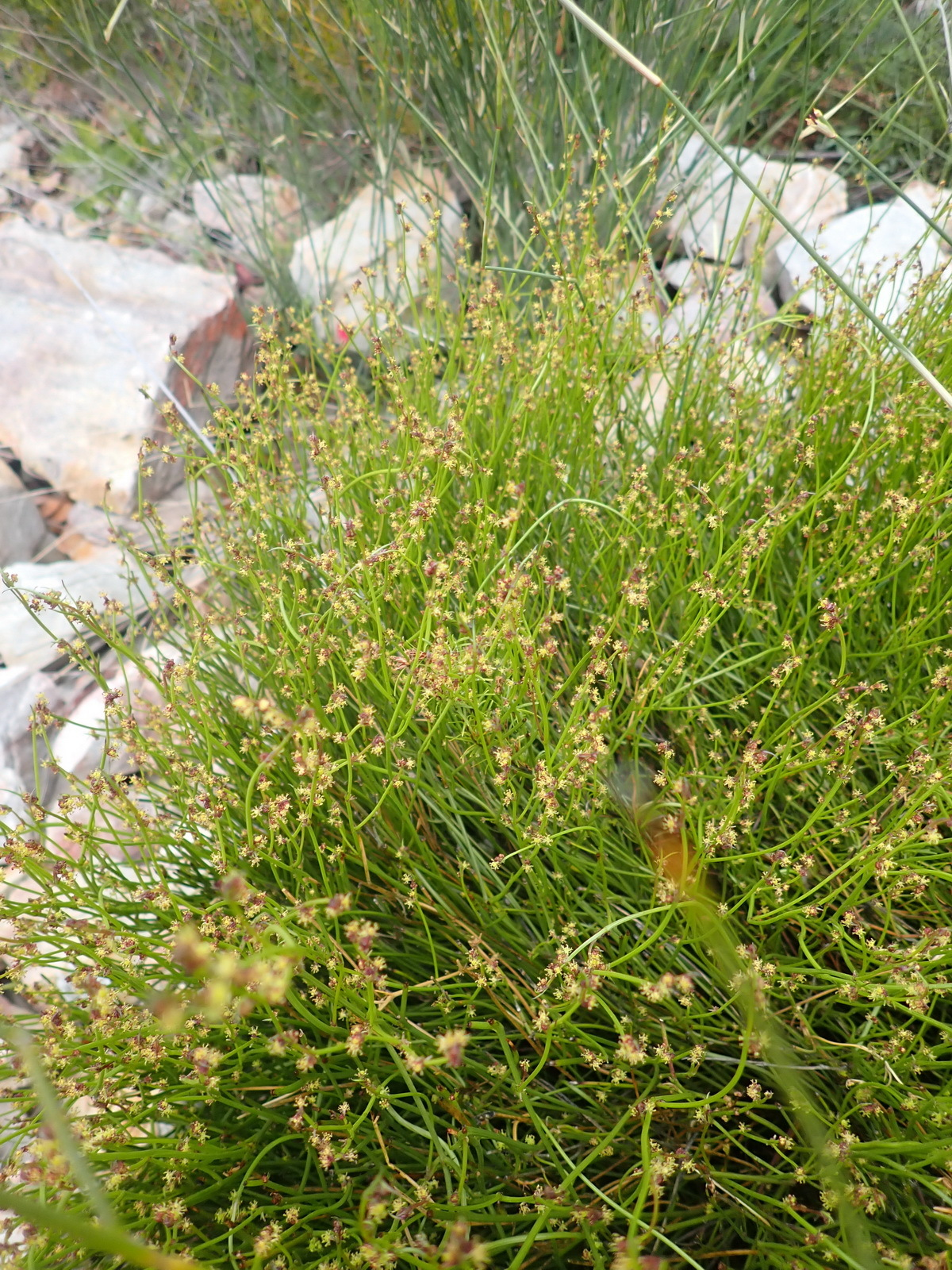
- Adenocline pauciflora

Scientific classification
- Kingdom: Plantae
- Clade: Tracheophytes
- Clade: Angiosperms
- Clade: Eudicots
- Clade: Rosids
- Order: Malpighiales
- Family: Euphorbiaceae
- Subfamily: Crotonoideae
- Tribe: Adenoclineae
- Subtribe: Adenoclininae
- Genus: Adenocline; Turcz.

Synonyms
- Diplostylis Sond.

= Adenocline =

Genus of flowering plants

Adenocline is a genus of plants, under the family Euphorbiaceae first described as a genus in 1843. It is native to southern Africa (South Africa, Zimbabwe, Malawi).

Species

1. Adenocline acuta (Thunb.) Baill. - Malawi, Zimbabwe, Cape Province
2. Adenocline pauciflora Turcz. - KwaZulu-Natal, Cape Province
3. Adenocline violifolia (Kunze) Prain - Cape Province

Formerly included

moved to Leidesia

- A. procumbens - Leidesia procumbens
