= Micrococca scariosa =

Conservation status
- Vulnerable (IUCN 3.1)

Scientific classification
- Kingdom: Plantae
- Clade: Tracheophytes
- Clade: Angiosperms
- Clade: Eudicots
- Clade: Rosids
- Order: Malpighiales
- Family: Euphorbiaceae
- Genus: Micrococca
- Species: M. scariosa

Binomial name
- Micrococca scariosa Prain

Species of flowering plant

Micrococca scariosa is a species of plant in the family Euphorbiaceae. It is found in Kenya and Tanzania.
