= Lobanilia =

Scientific classification
- Kingdom: Plantae
- Clade: Tracheophytes
- Clade: Angiosperms
- Clade: Eudicots
- Clade: Rosids
- Order: Malpighiales
- Family: Euphorbiaceae
- Subfamily: Acalyphoideae
- Tribe: Acalypheae
- Subtribe: Lobaniliinae
- Genus: Lobanilia; Radcl.-Sm.

Type species
- Lobanilia luteobrunnea (Baker) Radcl.-Sm.

Genus of flowering plants

Lobanilia is a plant genus of the family Euphorbiaceae and the sole genus of the subtribe Lobaniliinae. It was first described as a genus in 1989 and is endemic to Madagascar.

Species

1. Lobanilia asterothrix Radcl.-Sm.
2. Lobanilia bakeriana (Baill.) Radcl.-Sm.
3. Lobanilia claoxyloides Radcl.-Sm.
4. Lobanilia crotonoides Radcl.-Sm.
5. Lobanilia hirtella (Baill.) Radcl.-Sm.
6. Lobanilia luteobrunnea (Baker) Radcl.-Sm.
7. Lobanilia ovalis (Baill.) Radcl.-Sm.
