= Mareyopsis =

Scientific classification
- Kingdom: Plantae
- Clade: Tracheophytes
- Clade: Angiosperms
- Clade: Eudicots
- Clade: Rosids
- Order: Malpighiales
- Family: Euphorbiaceae
- Subfamily: Acalyphoideae
- Tribe: Acalypheae
- Subtribe: Mareyinae
- Genus: Mareyopsis; Pax & K.Hoffm.

Type species
- Mareyopsis longifolia (Pax) Pax & K.Hoffm.

Genus of flowering plants

Mareyopsis is a plant genus of the family Euphorbiaceae first described as a genus in 1919. It is native to western and central Africa.

Species

1. Mareyopsis longifolia (Pax) Pax & K.Hoffm. - Nigeria, Cameroon, Gabon, Equatorial Guinea, Congo-Brazzaville, Zaire
2. Mareyopsis oligogyna Breteler - Gabon
