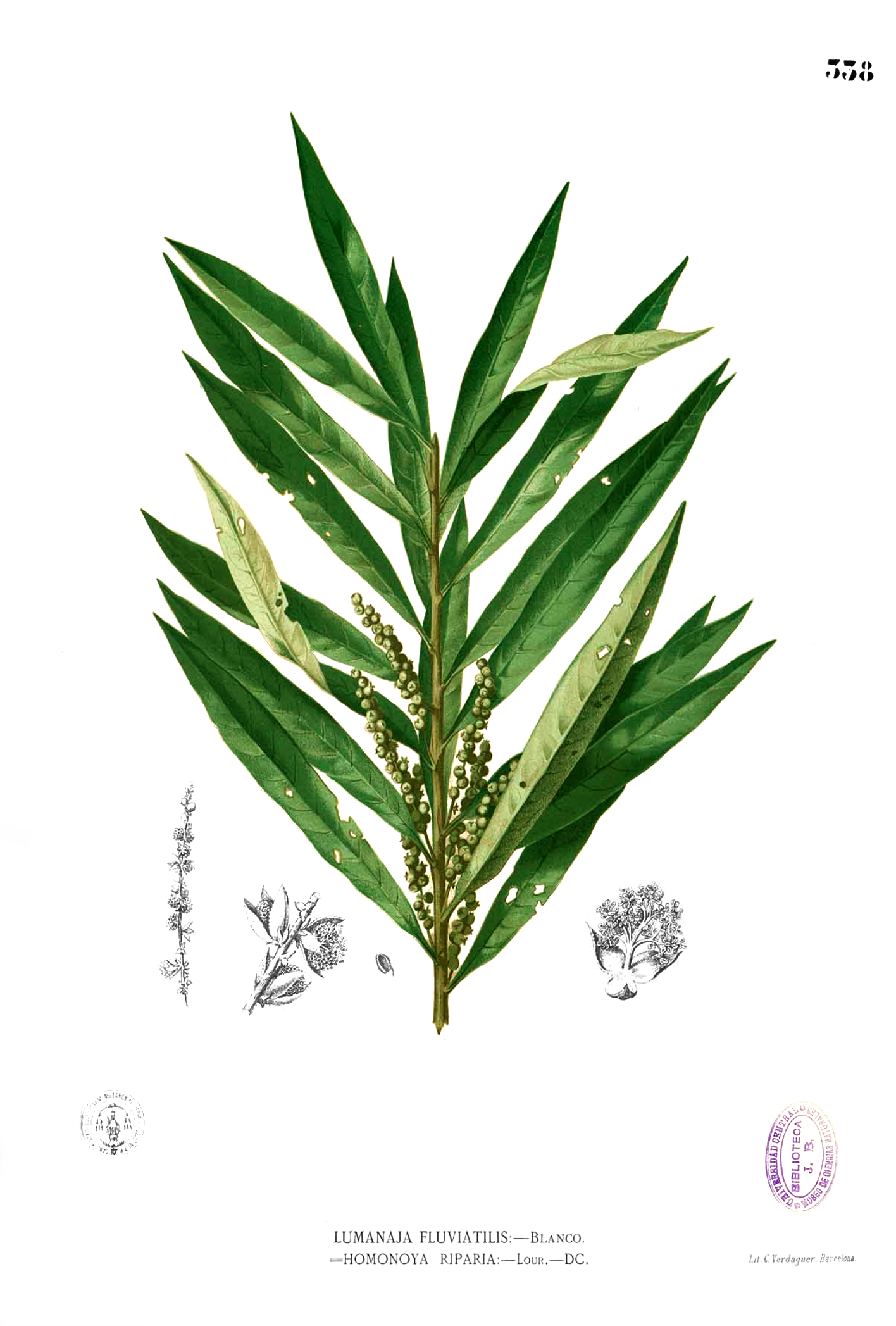
- Homonoia riparia

Conservation status
- Least Concern (IUCN 3.1)

Scientific classification
- Kingdom: Plantae
- Clade: Tracheophytes
- Clade: Angiosperms
- Clade: Eudicots
- Clade: Rosids
- Order: Malpighiales
- Family: Euphorbiaceae
- Genus: Homonoia
- Species: H. riparia

Binomial name
- Homonoia riparia Lour.

Synonyms
- Adelia neriifolia B.Heyne ex Roth; Croton salicifolius Geiseler; Haematospermum neriifolium (B.Heyne ex Roth) Wall. ex Voigt; Haematospermum salicinum (Hassk.) Baill.; Lumanaja juviatilis Blanco; Ricinus salicinus Hassk.; Spathiostemon salicinus (Hassk.) Hassk.; Spathiostemon salicinus var. angustifolius Miq.

= Homonoia riparia =

Willow-leaved water croton

Species of flowering plant

Homonoia riparia is a species of flowering plant in the spurge family, Euphorbiaceae.

== Distribution ==
It is a mangrove species that is native to the Andaman Islands, Assam, Bangladesh, Borneo, Cambodia, South-Central and Southeast China, Himalaya, Hainan, India, Indonesia, Java, Laos, the Lesser Sunda Islands, Malaysia, Myanmar, New Guinea, the Nicobar Islands, the Philippines, Sri Lanka, Taiwan, Thailand and Vietnam. It is grows in wet soil near river banks and flooded plains.

== Description ==
- Bark - brownish
- Leaves - simple, and alternate
- Flowers - wind pollinated monoecious flowers and bracts sub-ovate
- Height - 1–3-metre-tall evergreen shrub
- Ecology - A rheophyte
- Uses - medicine

== Common names ==
The names are according to Asian Plant.net and Indian Flowers

- Borneo - Bongai tidong, Parang-parang
- Burma - Kyauk(a)naga, Momaka, Nyin ye bin.
- Cambodia - Rey tuck.
- China - Shui liu, shui yeung mui.
- English - Willow-Leaved Water Croton.
- India
  - Hindi - Sherni (शेरनी)
  - Marathi - Raan kaner (रान कणेर)
  - Tamil - Kattalari (காட்டலரி)
  - Malayalam - Neervanchi, Puzhavanchi
  - Telugu - Adavi ganneru (అడవి గన్నేరు)
  - Kannada - Hole nage, Niru kanigalu (ಹೊಳೆ ನಗೆ)
  - Sanskrit - Kshudrapashanabheda (क्षुद्रपाषाणभेद)
- Java - Kajoe soebah, Keding djati, Soebah/Sobah,
- Laos - Kek khay.
- Philippines - Agooi, Agoioi, Agukuk,
- Thailand - K(l)ai nam, Klai hin, Mai kerai, (Ta)kri nam.
- Sri Lanka - Omi (ඕමි), Werawala (වැරවල)
- Sumatra - Sangka, Sangkir
- Vietnam - Cây rù rì nước, Rì rì, Rù rì.
