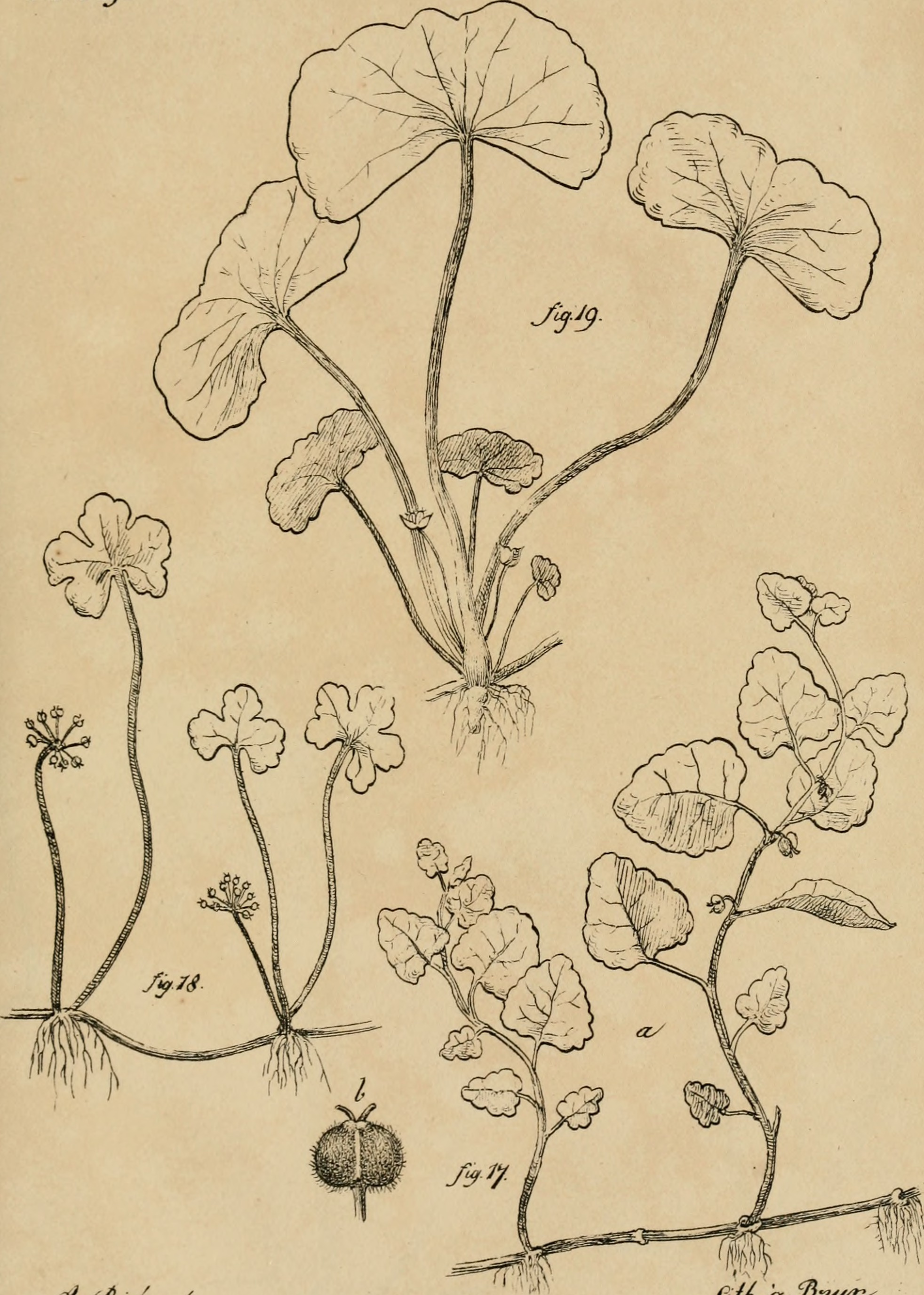

Scientific classification
- Kingdom: Plantae
- Clade: Tracheophytes
- Clade: Angiosperms
- Clade: Eudicots
- Clade: Rosids
- Order: Malpighiales
- Family: Euphorbiaceae
- Subfamily: Acalyphoideae
- Tribe: Acalypheae
- Subtribe: Dysopsidinae
- Genus: Dysopsis; Baill.

Type species
- Dysopsis gayana (syn of Dysopsis glechomoides) Baill.

Synonyms
- Mirabellia Baill.; Molina Gay

= Dysopsis =

Genus of flowering plants

Dysopsis is a genus of plants in the family Euphorbiaceae, first described in 1858. It is the sole genus in subtribe Dysopsidinae. The genus is native to Costa Rica, Panama, South America, and the Juan Fernández Islands.

Species

1. Dysopsis glechomoides (A.Rich.) Müll.Arg. - Chile, S Argentina
2. Dysopsis hirsuta (Müll.Arg.) Skottsb. - Juan Fernández Islands
3. Dysopsis paucidentata (Müll.Arg.) Lozano & J.Murillo - Costa Rica, Panama, Colombia, Venezuela, Ecuador, Peru, Bolivia
