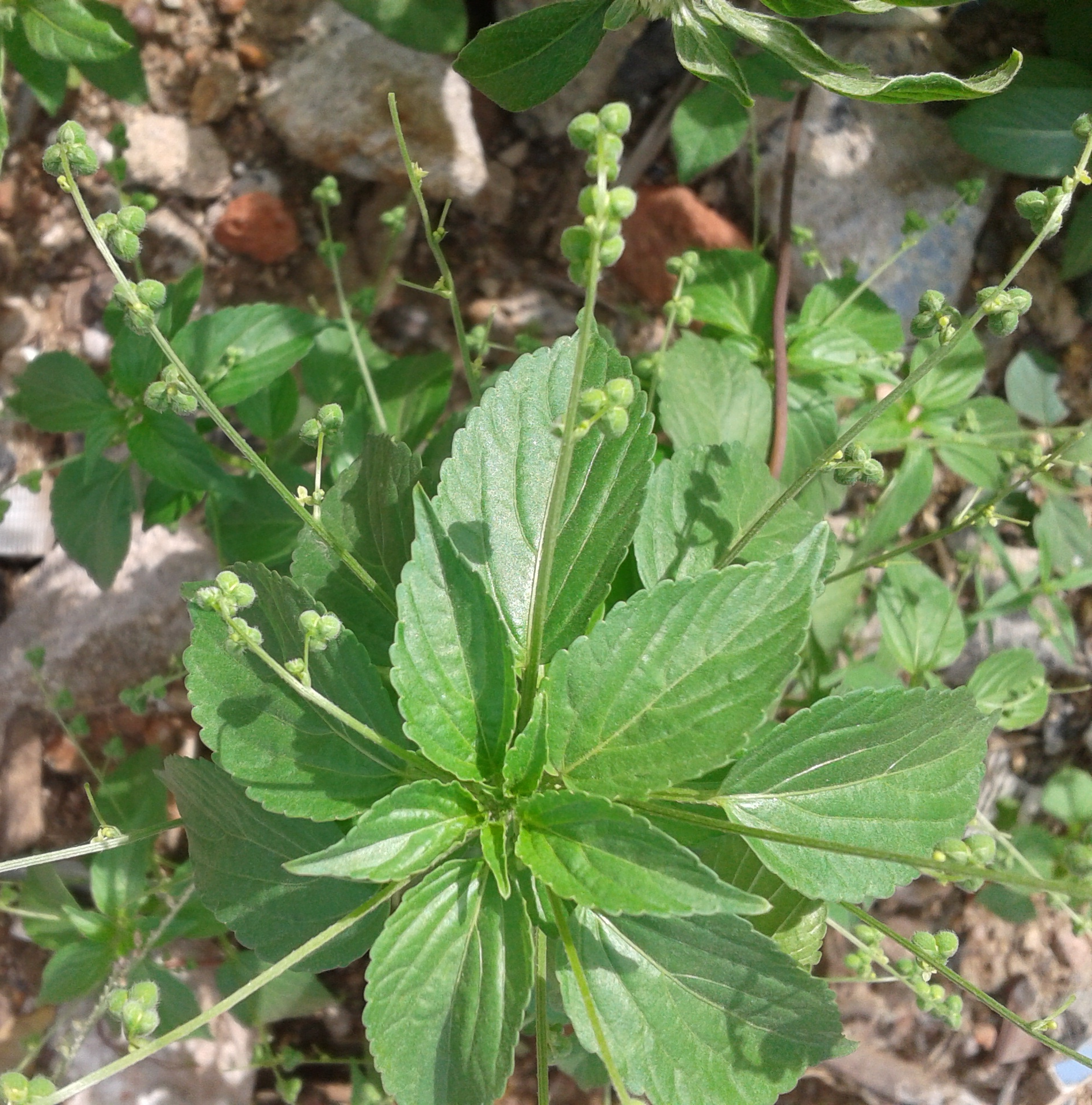
- Micrococca mercurialis in India

Scientific classification
- Kingdom: Plantae
- Clade: Tracheophytes
- Clade: Angiosperms
- Clade: Eudicots
- Clade: Rosids
- Order: Malpighiales
- Family: Euphorbiaceae
- Subfamily: Acalyphoideae
- Tribe: Acalypheae
- Subtribe: Claoxylinae
- Genus: Micrococca; Benth.

Type species
- Micrococca mercurialis (L.) Benth.

= Micrococca =

Genus of flowering plants

Micrococca is a plant genus of the family Euphorbiaceae, first described in 1849. It is native to tropical Africa, Madagascar, and Asia (Old World Tropics).

== Species ==
- Micrococca beddomei – Kerala, Tamil Nadu
- Micrococca capensis – Mozambique, KwaZulu-Natal
- Micrococca holstii – Kenya, Tanzania
- Micrococca humblotiana – Comoros
- Micrococca johorica – Johor
- Micrococca lancifolia – Madagascar
- Micrococca malaccensis – Peninsular Malaysia
- Micrococca mercurialis – sub-Saharan Africa, Madagascar, Arabian Peninsula, Indian Subcontinent, Indochina, Peninsular Malaysia
- Micrococca oligandra – Sri Lanka, S India
- Micrococca scariosa – Kenya, Tanzania, Mozambique
- Micrococca volkensii – Tanzania
- Micrococca wightii – Tamil Nadu

== Formerly included ==
The following species were moved to Erythrococca

- Micrococca berberidea – Erythrococca berberidea
- Micrococca natalensis – Erythrococca natalensis
