= Clonostylis =

Conservation status
- Endangered (IUCN 3.1)

Scientific classification
- Kingdom: Plantae
- Clade: Tracheophytes
- Clade: Angiosperms
- Clade: Eudicots
- Clade: Rosids
- Order: Malpighiales
- Family: Euphorbiaceae
- Subfamily: Acalyphoideae
- Tribe: Acalypheae
- Subtribe: Lasiococcinae
- Genus: Clonostylis; S.Moore
- Species: C. forbesii

Binomial name
- Clonostylis forbesii S.Moore

Synonyms
- Homotypic Synonyms: Spathiostemon forbesii (S.Moore) Airy Shaw

Genus of flowering plants

Clonostylis is a monotypic genus of flowering plant in the family Euphorbiaceae. The sole species is Clonostylis forbesii is a flowering tree found in Sumatra. It has small, elliptical, glabrous leaves, arranged spirally.

== Taxonomy ==
It was previously thought that Clonostylis S.Moore was a synonym of Spathiostemon Blume, but now Clonostylis is provisionally treated as a monotypic genus.

Since only one specimen has been found, according to the Nationaal Herbarium Nederland, and it did not exhibit fruit or staminate flowers, a more definite classification is not yet possible. (The species is unisexual, and the specimen in question had only pistillate flowers.)
