= Leidesia =

Scientific classification
- Kingdom: Plantae
- Clade: Embryophytes
- Clade: Tracheophytes
- Clade: Angiosperms
- Clade: Eudicots
- Clade: Rosids
- Order: Malpighiales
- Family: Euphorbiaceae
- Subfamily: Acalyphoideae
- Tribe: Acalypheae
- Subtribe: Mercurialinae
- Genus: Leidesia; Mull. Arg.
- Species: L. procumbens

Binomial name
- Leidesia procumbens (L.) Prain

Synonyms
- Mercurialis procumbens L.; Paradenocline procumbens (L.) Müll.Arg.; Adenocline procumbens (L.) Druce; Croton ricinocarpus L.; Croton ricinokarpos Houtt.; Mercurialis androgyna Steud.; Acalypha obtusa Thunb.; Mercurialis tricocca Eckl. & Zeyh. ex Krauss; Mercurialis capensis (L.f.) Spreng. ex Sond.; Leidesia capensis (L.f.) Müll.Arg.; Leidesia obtusa (Thunb.) Müll.Arg.; Leidesia sonderiana Müll.Arg.; Leidesia procumbens var. obtusa (Thunb.) Pax & K.Hoffm.

Genus of flowering plants in the spurge family

Leidesia is a monotypic plant genus in the family Euphorbiaceae first described as a genus in 1866. The sole species is Leidesia procumbens. The species is widespread in Southern Africa as far north as Democratic Republic of the Congo.

The genus name of Leidesia is in honour of Carl Friedrich Seidel (d. 1898), a German painter and botanist, and/or Jacob Friedrich Seidel (1789–1860), a German gardener, and/or Johann Heinrich Seidel (1744–1815), a German court gardener.

Species formerly included,

moved to Seidelia

- Leidesia firmula Prain – Seidelia firmula (Prain) Pax & K.Hoffm.
