= Seidelia =

Scientific classification
- Kingdom: Plantae
- Clade: Tracheophytes
- Clade: Angiosperms
- Clade: Eudicots
- Clade: Rosids
- Order: Malpighiales
- Family: Euphorbiaceae
- Subfamily: Acalyphoideae
- Tribe: Acalypheae
- Subtribe: Mercurialinae
- Genus: Seidelia; Baill.

Type species
- Seidelia mercurialis (syn of Seidelia triandra) Baill.

Genus of flowering plants

Seidelia is a plant genus of the family Euphorbiaceae first described as a genus in 1858. The genus is endemic to Southern Africa (South Africa and Namibia).

Species

1. Seidelia firmula (Prain) Pax & K.Hoffm - Namibia, Cape Province
2. Seidelia triandra (E.Mey.) Pax - Namibia, Cape Province, Free State
