= Jacques Désiré Leandri =

French botanist and mycologist

Jacques Désiré Leandri, born 1903 in Corsica, died 1982, was a French botanist and mycologist.

Leandri is remembered for botanical excursions in North Africa (Morocco) and Madagascar. He collected plants for scientific study from the years 1922 to 1980. The plant genus Leandriella from the family Acanthaceae is named after him. As a taxonomist, he circumscribed many plants within the family Euphorbiaceae.

== Publications ==
- Les arbres et grands arbustes Malgaches de la famille des Euphorbiaceaes. Naturaliste Malgache 4: 47–82 (1952)
- Les Euphorbes Malgaches Epineuses et Charnues du Jardin Botanique de Tsimbazaz, 144–154 (1954) with E. Ursch
- Un Naturaliste du Muséum a la Recherche des Quinquinas: Hugh Algernon Weddell (1819–1877) Adansonia 6: 165–173 (1966)
