= Yimnashana =

Scientific classification
- Kingdom: Animalia
- Phylum: Arthropoda
- Class: Insecta
- Order: Coleoptera
- Suborder: Polyphaga
- Infraorder: Cucujiformia
- Family: Cerambycidae
- Tribe: Gyaritini
- Genus: Yimnashana; Gressitt, 1937

Subgenera and species
- See text.

Genus of beetles

Yimnashana is a genus of longhorn beetles of the subfamily Lamiinae. The genus Tinkhamia is included as a subgenus.

== Taxonomy ==
The genus Yimnashana was established in 1937 by Gressitt. In 2016, the genus Tinkhamia was reduced to a subgenus of Yimnashana. The authors considered that Tinkhamia was very closely related to Yimnashana, differing only in having completely divided eyes and even more reduced wings. A phylogenetic analysis based on similarity measures showed that when treated as separate, Tinkhamia and Yimnashana were the most closely related genera within the tribe Gyaritini.

=== Subgenera and species ===
As of October 2023, BioLib accepted two subgenera, containing seven species in total.

- Subgenus Yimnashana Gressitt, 1937
  - Yimnashana alfredi Gouverneur & Vitali, 2016
  - Yimnashana befui Vitali & Gouverneur, 2017
  - Yimnashana bezarki Vitali & Gouverneur, 2017
  - Yimnashana denticulata Gressitt, 1937
- Subgenus Tinkhamia Gressitt, 1937
  - Yimnashana borneana Vives & Heffern, 2021
  - Yimnashana hamulata (Gressitt, 1937)
  - Yimnashana validicornis (Gressitt, 1951)

Species formerly placed in Yimnashana include:

- Yimnashana ceylonica Breuning, 1961 = Ceylania ceylonica (Breuning, 1979)
- Yimnashana lungtauensis Gressitt, 1951 = Gyaritus lungtauensis (Gressitt, 1951)
- Yimnashana theae Gressitt, 1951 = Gyaritus theae (Gressitt, 1951)
- Yimnashana wakaharai Yamasako, Hasegawa & Ohbayashi, 2012 = Elegantogyaritus wakaharai (Yamasako, Hasegawa & Ohbayashi, 2012)
