= Gyaritodes =

Scientific classification
- Kingdom: Animalia
- Phylum: Arthropoda
- Class: Insecta
- Order: Coleoptera
- Suborder: Polyphaga
- Infraorder: Cucujiformia
- Family: Cerambycidae
- Tribe: Gyaritini
- Genus: Gyaritodes

Genus of beetles

Gyaritodes is a genus of longhorn beetles of the subfamily Lamiinae, containing the following species:

- Gyaritodes bispinosus Breuning, 1960
- Gyaritodes inspinosus Breuning, 1947
- Gyaritodes javanicus Breuning, 1963
- Gyaritodes laosensis Breuning, 1963
