= Gyaritini =

Scientific classification
- Domain: Eukaryota
- Kingdom: Animalia
- Phylum: Arthropoda
- Class: Insecta
- Order: Coleoptera
- Suborder: Polyphaga
- Infraorder: Cucujiformia
- Family: Cerambycidae
- Subfamily: Lamiinae
- Tribe: Gyaritini; Breuning, 1956

Tribe of beetles

Gyaritini is a tribe of longhorn beetles of the subfamily Lamiinae. It was described by Breuning in 1956.

== Taxonomy ==
As of October 2023, BioLib accepted the following genera:

- Arachnogyaritus Gouverneur & Vitali, 2016
- Archeogyaritus Gouverneur & Vitali, 2016
- Ceylania Gouverneur & Vitali, 2016
- Elegantogyaritus Gouverneur & Vitali, 2016
- Gyaritus Pascoe, 1858
- Microleropsis Gressitt, 1937
- Nosavana Breuning, 1963
- Paradriopea Breuning, 1965
- Pseudoloessa Gouverneur & Vitali, 2016
- Yimnashana Gressitt, 1937
- Yimnashaniana Hua, 1986

The genus Gyaritodes Breuning, 1947 has been included in the tribe, but is not accepted by BioLib.
