= Yimnashana hamulata =

Scientific classification
- Kingdom: Animalia
- Phylum: Arthropoda
- Clade: Pancrustacea
- Class: Insecta
- Order: Coleoptera
- Suborder: Polyphaga
- Infraorder: Cucujiformia
- Family: Cerambycidae
- Genus: Yimnashana
- Species: Y. hamulata

Binomial name
- Yimnashana hamulata (Gressitt, 1937)

Synonyms
- Of the species: Tinkhamia hamulata Gressitt, 1937; Of the subspecies: Tinkhamia hamulata hamulata Gressitt, 1937; Tinkhamia hamulata lautauana Gressitt, 1937

Species of beetle

Yimnashana hamulata is a species of beetle in the family Cerambycidae.

== Taxonomy ==
Yimnashana hamulata was first described by Gressitt in 1937 as Tinkhamia hamulata; it was the type species of his newly created genus Tinkhamia. A revision of the tribe Gyaritini in 2016 concluded that Tinkhamia was very closely similar to Yimnashana, and reduced Tinkhamia to a subgenus of Yimnashana. Tinkhamia hamulata thus became Yimnashana (Tinkhamia) hamulata.

== Subspecies ==
- Yimnashana hamulata hamulata (Gressitt, 1937)
- Yimnashana hamulata lautauana (Gressitt, 1937)
