= Pseudoloessa =

Scientific classification
- Kingdom: Animalia
- Phylum: Arthropoda
- Class: Insecta
- Order: Coleoptera
- Suborder: Polyphaga
- Infraorder: Cucujiformia
- Family: Cerambycidae
- Tribe: Gyaritini
- Genus: Pseudoloessa

Genus of beetles

Pseudoloessa is a genus of beetles in the family Cerambycidae.

== Species ==
- Pseudoloessa bispinosa (Breuning, 1960)
- Pseudoloessa javanica (Breuning, 1963)
- Pseudoloessa laosensis (Breuning, 1963)
