= Gyaritus varius =

Scientific classification
- Kingdom: Animalia
- Phylum: Arthropoda
- Class: Insecta
- Order: Coleoptera
- Suborder: Polyphaga
- Infraorder: Cucujiformia
- Family: Cerambycidae
- Genus: Gyaritus
- Species: G. varius

Binomial name
- Gyaritus varius (Pascoe, 1864)

Synonyms
- Axinyllium varium Pascoe, 1864

Species of beetle

Gyaritus varius is a species of beetle in the family Cerambycidae. It was described by Francis Polkinghorne Pascoe in 1864. It is known from Borneo and Malaysia.
