= Yimnashana validicornis =

Scientific classification
- Domain: Eukaryota
- Kingdom: Animalia
- Phylum: Arthropoda
- Class: Insecta
- Order: Coleoptera
- Suborder: Polyphaga
- Infraorder: Cucujiformia
- Family: Cerambycidae
- Genus: Yimnashana
- Species: Y. validicornis

Binomial name
- Yimnashana validicornis Gressitt, 1951

Synonyms
- Tinkhamia validicornis Gressitt, 1951

Species of beetle

Yimnashana validicornis is a species of beetle in the family Cerambycidae. It was described by Gressitt in 1951. It is known from China.
