= Yimnashana denticulata =

Scientific classification
- Domain: Eukaryota
- Kingdom: Animalia
- Phylum: Arthropoda
- Class: Insecta
- Order: Coleoptera
- Suborder: Polyphaga
- Infraorder: Cucujiformia
- Family: Cerambycidae
- Genus: Yimnashana
- Species: Y. denticulata

Binomial name
- Yimnashana denticulata Gressitt, 1937

Species of beetle

Yimnashana denticulata is a species of beetle in the family Cerambycidae. It was described by Gressitt in 1937. It is known from Laos and China.
