= Arachnogyaritus saleuii =

Scientific classification
- Kingdom: Animalia
- Phylum: Arthropoda
- Class: Insecta
- Order: Coleoptera
- Suborder: Polyphaga
- Infraorder: Cucujiformia
- Family: Cerambycidae
- Genus: Arachnogyaritus
- Species: A. saleuii

Binomial name
- Arachnogyaritus saleuii Gouverneur & Vitali, 2016

Species of beetle

Arachnogyaritus saleuii is a species of beetle in the family Cerambycidae. It was described by Gouverneur and Vitali in 2016. It is known from Laos.
