= Arachnogyaritus =

Scientific classification
- Kingdom: Animalia
- Phylum: Arthropoda
- Class: Insecta
- Order: Coleoptera
- Suborder: Polyphaga
- Infraorder: Cucujiformia
- Family: Cerambycidae
- Subfamily: Lamiinae
- Tribe: Gyaritini
- Genus: Arachnogyaritus; Gouverneur & F. Vitali, 2016

Genus of beetles

Arachnogyaritus is a genus of beetles in the family Cerambycidae.

== Species ==
- Arachnogyaritus celestini Gouverneur & Vitali, 2016
- Arachnogyaritus saleuii Gouverneur & Vitali, 2016
