= Gyaritodes inspinosus =

Scientific classification
- Kingdom: Animalia
- Phylum: Arthropoda
- Class: Insecta
- Order: Coleoptera
- Suborder: Polyphaga
- Infraorder: Cucujiformia
- Family: Cerambycidae
- Genus: Gyaritodes
- Species: G. inspinosus

Binomial name
- Gyaritodes inspinosus Breuning, 1947

Species of beetle

Gyaritodes inspinosus is a species of beetle in the family Cerambycidae, and the type species of its genus. It was described by Stephan von Breuning in 1947.
