= Gyaritus theae =

Scientific classification
- Kingdom: Animalia
- Phylum: Arthropoda
- Class: Insecta
- Order: Coleoptera
- Suborder: Polyphaga
- Infraorder: Cucujiformia
- Family: Cerambycidae
- Genus: Gyaritus
- Species: G. theae

Binomial name
- Gyaritus theae Gressitt, 1951

Synonyms
- Yimnashana theae Gressitt, 1951

Species of beetle

Gyaritus theae is a species of beetle in the family Cerambycidae. It was described by Gressitt in 1951. It is known from China.
