= Gyaritus fulvopictus =

Scientific classification
- Kingdom: Animalia
- Phylum: Arthropoda
- Class: Insecta
- Order: Coleoptera
- Suborder: Polyphaga
- Infraorder: Cucujiformia
- Family: Cerambycidae
- Genus: Gyaritus
- Species: G. fulvopictus

Binomial name
- Gyaritus fulvopictus Pascoe, 1864

Species of beetle

Gyaritus fulvopictus is a species of beetle in the family Cerambycidae. It was described by Francis Polkinghorne Pascoe in 1864. It is known from Borneo.
