= Ceylania =

Scientific classification
- Kingdom: Animalia
- Phylum: Arthropoda
- Class: Insecta
- Order: Coleoptera
- Suborder: Polyphaga
- Infraorder: Cucujiformia
- Family: Cerambycidae
- Subfamily: Lamiinae
- Tribe: Gyaritini
- Genus: Ceylania; Gouverneur & F. Vitali, 2016

Genus of beetles

Ceylania is a genus of flat-faced longhorns in the beetle family Cerambycidae. There are at least two described species in Ceylania.

== Species ==
These two species belong to the genus Ceylania:

- Ceylania ceylonica (Breuning, 1961)
- Ceylania ovalipennis Holzschuh, 2017
