= Archeogyaritus =

Scientific classification
- Kingdom: Animalia
- Phylum: Arthropoda
- Class: Insecta
- Order: Coleoptera
- Suborder: Polyphaga
- Infraorder: Cucujiformia
- Family: Cerambycidae
- Subfamily: Lamiinae
- Tribe: Gyaritini
- Genus: Archeogyaritus; Gouverneur & Vitali, 2016
- Species: A. andrei

Binomial name
- Archeogyaritus andrei Gouverneur & Vitali, 2016

Genus of beetles

Archeogyaritus andrei is a species of beetle in the family Cerambycidae, and the type species of the monotypic genus Archeogyaritus. It was described by Gouverneur and Vitali in 2016.
