= Gyaritus auratus =

Scientific classification
- Kingdom: Animalia
- Phylum: Arthropoda
- Class: Insecta
- Order: Coleoptera
- Suborder: Polyphaga
- Infraorder: Cucujiformia
- Family: Cerambycidae
- Genus: Gyaritus
- Species: G. auratus

Binomial name
- Gyaritus auratus Breuning, 1963

Species of beetle

Gyaritus auratus is a species of beetle in the family Cerambycidae. It was described by Stephan von Breuning in 1963.
