= Gyaritus viduus =

Scientific classification
- Kingdom: Animalia
- Phylum: Arthropoda
- Class: Insecta
- Order: Coleoptera
- Suborder: Polyphaga
- Infraorder: Cucujiformia
- Family: Cerambycidae
- Genus: Gyaritus
- Species: G. viduus

Binomial name
- Gyaritus viduus (Pascoe, 1886)

Synonyms
- Gyaritus transversevittatus Breuning, 1939; Zeargyra viduua Pascoe, 1886

Species of beetle

Gyaritus viduus is a species of beetle in the family Cerambycidae. It was described by Francis Polkinghorne Pascoe in 1886. It is known from Borneo and Malaysia.
