= Ceylania ceylonica =

Scientific classification
- Kingdom: Animalia
- Phylum: Arthropoda
- Class: Insecta
- Order: Coleoptera
- Suborder: Polyphaga
- Infraorder: Cucujiformia
- Family: Cerambycidae
- Subfamily: Lamiinae
- Tribe: Gyaritini
- Genus: Ceylania
- Species: C. ceylonica

Binomial name
- Ceylania ceylonica (Breuning, 1961)

Synonyms
- Yimnashana ceylonica Breuning, 1961

Species of beetle

Ceylania ceylonica is a species of beetle in the family Cerambycidae, and the type species of its genus. It was described by Stephan von Breuning in 1979. It is known from Sri Lanka.
