= Gyaritus quadridentatus =

Scientific classification
- Kingdom: Animalia
- Phylum: Arthropoda
- Class: Insecta
- Order: Coleoptera
- Suborder: Polyphaga
- Infraorder: Cucujiformia
- Family: Cerambycidae
- Genus: Gyaritus
- Species: G. quadridentatus

Binomial name
- Gyaritus quadridentatus (Pic, 1936)

Synonyms
- Mimoenispia 4-dentata Pic, 1936; Mimoenispia quadridentata Pic, 1936

Species of beetle

Gyaritus quadridentatus is a species of beetle in the family Cerambycidae. It was described by Maurice Pic in 1936. It is known from Vietnam.
