= Gyaritus lungtauensis =

Scientific classification
- Kingdom: Animalia
- Phylum: Arthropoda
- Class: Insecta
- Order: Coleoptera
- Suborder: Polyphaga
- Infraorder: Cucujiformia
- Family: Cerambycidae
- Genus: Gyaritus
- Species: G. lungtauensis

Binomial name
- Gyaritus lungtauensis Gressitt, 1951

Synonyms
- Yimnashana lungtauensis Gressitt, 1951

Species of beetle

Gyaritus lungtauensis is a species of beetle in the family Cerambycidae. It was described by Gressitt in 1951. It is known from China.
