= Nosavana laosensis =

Scientific classification
- Kingdom: Animalia
- Phylum: Arthropoda
- Class: Insecta
- Order: Coleoptera
- Suborder: Polyphaga
- Infraorder: Cucujiformia
- Family: Cerambycidae
- Genus: Nosavana
- Species: N. laosensis

Binomial name
- Nosavana laosensis (Breuning, 1963)

Species of beetle

Nosavana laosensis is a species of beetle in the family Cerambycidae. It was described by Stephan von Breuning in 1963.
