= Gyaritus hamatus =

Scientific classification
- Kingdom: Animalia
- Phylum: Arthropoda
- Class: Insecta
- Order: Coleoptera
- Suborder: Polyphaga
- Infraorder: Cucujiformia
- Family: Cerambycidae
- Genus: Gyaritus
- Species: G. hamatus

Binomial name
- Gyaritus hamatus Pascoe, 1858

Species of beetle

Gyaritus hamatus is a species of beetle in the family Cerambycidae. It was described by Francis Polkinghorne Pascoe in 1858. It is known from Malaysia and Borneo.
