= Gyaritus fuscosignatus =

Scientific classification
- Kingdom: Animalia
- Phylum: Arthropoda
- Class: Insecta
- Order: Coleoptera
- Suborder: Polyphaga
- Infraorder: Cucujiformia
- Family: Cerambycidae
- Genus: Gyaritus
- Species: G. fuscosignatus

Binomial name
- Gyaritus fuscosignatus Breuning & de Jong, 1941

Species of beetle

Gyaritus fuscosignatus is a species of beetle in the family Cerambycidae. It was described by Stephan von Breuning and de Jong in 1941.
