= Pseudoloessa bispinosa =

Scientific classification
- Kingdom: Animalia
- Phylum: Arthropoda
- Class: Insecta
- Order: Coleoptera
- Suborder: Polyphaga
- Infraorder: Cucujiformia
- Family: Cerambycidae
- Genus: Pseudoloessa
- Species: P. bispinosa

Binomial name
- Pseudoloessa bispinosa (Breuning, 1960)

Synonyms
- Gyaritodes bispinosus Breuning, 1960

Species of beetle

Pseudoloessa bispinosa is a species of beetle in the family Cerambycidae, and the type species of its genus. It was described by Stephan von Breuning in 1960. It is known from Borneo and Malaysia.
