= Yimnashaniana =

Scientific classification
- Kingdom: Animalia
- Phylum: Arthropoda
- Class: Insecta
- Order: Coleoptera
- Suborder: Polyphaga
- Infraorder: Cucujiformia
- Family: Cerambycidae
- Genus: Yimnashaniana
- Species: Y. jianfenglingensis

Binomial name
- Yimnashaniana jianfenglingensis Hua, 1986

Genus of beetles

Yimnashaniana jianfenglingensis is a species of beetle in the family Cerambycidae, and the only species in the genus Yimnashaniana. It was described by Hua in 1986.
