= Microleropsis =

Scientific classification
- Kingdom: Animalia
- Phylum: Arthropoda
- Class: Insecta
- Order: Coleoptera
- Suborder: Polyphaga
- Infraorder: Cucujiformia
- Family: Cerambycidae
- Genus: Microleropsis
- Species: M. rufimembris

Binomial name
- Microleropsis rufimembris Gressitt, 1937

Genus of beetles

Microleropsis rufimembris is a species of beetle in the family Cerambycidae, and the only species in the genus Microleropsis. It was described by Gressitt in 1937.
