= Nosavana =

Scientific classification
- Domain: Eukaryota
- Kingdom: Animalia
- Phylum: Arthropoda
- Class: Insecta
- Order: Coleoptera
- Suborder: Polyphaga
- Infraorder: Cucujiformia
- Family: Cerambycidae
- Genus: Nosavana

Genus of beetles

Nosavana is a genus of longhorn beetles of the subfamily Lamiinae, containing the following species:

- Nosavana laosensis (Breuning, 1963)
- Nosavana phoumii Breuning, 1963
