= Paradriopea =

Scientific classification
- Domain: Eukaryota
- Kingdom: Animalia
- Phylum: Arthropoda
- Class: Insecta
- Order: Coleoptera
- Suborder: Polyphaga
- Infraorder: Cucujiformia
- Family: Cerambycidae
- Tribe: Acanthocinini
- Genus: Paradriopea

Genus of beetles

Paradriopea is a genus of beetles in the family Cerambycidae, containing the following species:

- Paradriopea birmanica Breuning, 1970
- Paradriopea fruhstorferi Breuning, 1965
