= Elegantogyaritus =

Scientific classification
- Kingdom: Animalia
- Phylum: Arthropoda
- Class: Insecta
- Order: Coleoptera
- Suborder: Polyphaga
- Infraorder: Cucujiformia
- Family: Cerambycidae
- Subfamily: Lamiinae
- Tribe: Gyaritini
- Genus: Elegantogyaritus; Gouverneur & F. Vitali, 2016
- Species: E. wakaharai

Binomial name
- Elegantogyaritus wakaharai (Yamasako, Hasegawa & Ohbayashi, 2012)

Synonyms
- Yimnashana wakaharai Yamasako, Hasegawa & Ohbayashi, 2012

Genus of beetles

Elegantogyaritus wakaharai is a species of beetle in the family Cerambycidae, and the type species of its genus. It was described by Yamasako, Hasegawa and Ohbayashi in 2012. It is known from Laos. It is the only species in the genus Elegantogyaritus.
