= Gyaritus =

Scientific classification
- Kingdom: Animalia
- Phylum: Arthropoda
- Class: Insecta
- Order: Coleoptera
- Suborder: Polyphaga
- Infraorder: Cucujiformia
- Family: Cerambycidae
- Subfamily: Lamiinae
- Tribe: Gyaritini
- Genus: Gyaritus; Pascoe, 1858

Genus of beetles

Gyaritus is a genus of longhorn beetles of the subfamily Lamiinae, containing the following species:

subgenus Axinyllium

- Gyaritus varius (Pascoe, 1864)

subgenus Gyaritus

- Gyaritus affinis Breuning, 1938
- Gyaritus auratus Breuning, 1963
- Gyaritus aurescens Breuning, 1940
- Gyaritus bangueyensis Breuning, 1958
- Gyaritus cinnamomeus Pascoe, 1864
- Gyaritus fulvopictus Pascoe, 1864
- Gyaritus fuscosignatus Breuning & de Jong, 1941
- Gyaritus gahani Breuning, 1938
- Gyaritus giganteus Breuning, 1938
- Gyaritus hamatus Pascoe, 1858
- Gyaritus indicus Breuning, 1938
- Gyaritus javanicus Breuning & de Jong, 1941
- Gyaritus malaccensis Breuning, 1938
- Gyaritus quadridentatus (Pic, 1936)
- Gyaritus siamensis Breuning, 1950
- Gyaritus spinosus Breuning, 1939
- Gyaritus viduus (Pascoe, 1886)
