= List of Euphorbia species (A–F) =

Euphorbia is a highly diverse plant genus, comprising some 2,000 currently accepted species.

This is an alphabetical list of the Euphorbia species.

The list includes the former (and never generally accepted) genus Chamaesyce, as well as the related genera Elaeophorbia, Endadenium, Monadenium, Synadenium and Pedilanthus which according to recent DNA sequence-based phylogenetic studies are all nested within Euphorbia

== A ==
- Euphorbia aaron-rossii A.H.Holmgren & N.H.Holmgren
- Euphorbia abdelkuri Balf.f.
- Euphorbia abdita (D.G.Burch) Radcl.-Sm.
- Euphorbia abdulghafooriana Abedin
- Euphorbia abramsiana L.C.Wheeler
- Euphorbia abyssinica J.F.Gmel.
- Euphorbia acalyphoides Hochst. ex Boiss.
- Euphorbia acanthoclada Pahlevani
- Euphorbia acanthodes Akhani
- Euphorbia acanthothamnos Heldr. & Sartori ex Boiss.
- Euphorbia accedens Halford & W.K.Harris
- Euphorbia acerensis Boiss.
- Euphorbia acervata S.Carter
- Euphorbia acolumella Sarojin. & Raja Kullayisw.
- Euphorbia actinoclada S.Carter
- Euphorbia aculeata Forssk.
- Euphorbia acuta Engelm.
- Euphorbia addoensis Marx & van Veldh.
- Euphorbia adenensis Deflers
- Euphorbia adenochila S.Carter
- Euphorbia adenochlora C.Morren & Decne.
- Euphorbia adenoplicata O.L.M.Silva & Cordeiro
- Euphorbia adenopoda Baill.
- Euphorbia adenoptera Bertol.
- Euphorbia adiantoides Lam.
- Euphorbia adjurana P.R.O.Bally & S.Carter
- Euphorbia aenigmatica Bruyns
- Euphorbia aeruginosa Schweick.
- Euphorbia agatheae Haev. & Hett.
- Euphorbia aggregata A.Berger
- Euphorbia agowensis Hochst. ex Boiss.
- Euphorbia agraria M.Bieb.
- Euphorbia akenocarpa Guss.
- Euphorbia akmanii I.Genç & Kültür
- Euphorbia alaica (Prokh.) Prokh.
- Euphorbia alainii Oudejans
- Euphorbia alata Hook.
- Euphorbia alatavica Boiss.
- Euphorbia alatocaulis V.W.Steinm. & Felger
- Euphorbia albipollinifera L.C.Leach
- Euphorbia albomarginata Torr. & A.Gray
- Euphorbia alborzensis Pahlevani & Frajman
- Euphorbia albrechtii Halford & W.K.Harris
- Euphorbia alcicornis Baker
- Euphorbia aleppica L.
- Euphorbia alfredii Rauh
- Euphorbia allocarpa S.Carter
- Euphorbia alluaudii Drake
- Euphorbia alpina Ledeb.
- Euphorbia alsinifolia Boiss.
- Euphorbia alsinoides Miq.
- Euphorbia alta Norton
- Euphorbia altaica Ledeb.
- Euphorbia altissima Boiss.
- Euphorbia altotibetica Paulsen
- Euphorbia amandi Oudejans
- Euphorbia ambacensis N.E.Br.
- Euphorbia ambarivatoensis Rauh & Bard.-Vauc.
- Euphorbia ambatomenahensis Rebmann
- Euphorbia ambohimiangarana J.-P.Castillon
- Euphorbia ambonaivoensis Rebmann
- Euphorbia ambovombensis Rauh & Razaf.
- Euphorbia ambroseae L.C.Leach
- Euphorbia amicorum S.Carter
- Euphorbia ammak Schweinf.
- Euphorbia ammatotricha Boiss.
- Euphorbia ammophila S.Carter & Dioli
- Euphorbia amplexicaulis Hook.f.
- Euphorbia ampliphylla Pax
- Euphorbia amygdaloides L.
- Euphorbia anacampseros Boiss.
- Euphorbia anachoreta Svent.
- Euphorbia analalavensis Leandri
- Euphorbia analamerae Leandri
- Euphorbia analavelonensis Rauh & Mangelsdorff
- Euphorbia andina Phil.
- Euphorbia andrachnoides Schrenk
- Euphorbia angularis Klotzsch
- Euphorbia angulata Jacq.
- Euphorbia angusta Engelm.
- Euphorbia angustiflora Pax
- Euphorbia anisopetala (Prokh.) Prokh.
- Euphorbia ankaranae Leandri
- Euphorbia ankazobensis Rauh & Hofstätter
- Euphorbia annamarieae Rauh
- Euphorbia anthonyi Brandegee
- Euphorbia antilibanotica Mouterde
- Euphorbia antiquorum L.
- Euphorbia antisyphilitica Zucc.
- Euphorbia antonii Oudejans
- Euphorbia antsingiensis (Cremers) Haev. & Hett.
- Euphorbia antso Denis
- Euphorbia anychioides Boiss.
- Euphorbia apatzingana McVaugh
- Euphorbia aphylla Brouss. ex Willd.
- Euphorbia apicata L.C.Wheeler
- Euphorbia apios L.
- Euphorbia apocynifolia Small
- Euphorbia apocynoides Klotzsch
- Euphorbia appariciana Rizzini
- Euphorbia appendiculata P.R.O.Bally & S.Carter
- Euphorbia applanata Thulin & Al-Gifri
- Euphorbia aprica Baill.
- Euphorbia apurimacensis Croizat
- Euphorbia arabica Hochst. & Steud. ex T.Anderson
- Euphorbia arabicoides N.E.Br.
- Euphorbia arahaka Poiss.
- Euphorbia araucana Phil.
- Euphorbia arbuscula Balf.f.
- Euphorbia ardonensis Galushko
- Euphorbia arenaria Kunth
- Euphorbia arenarioides Gagnep.
- Euphorbia argillosa Chodat & Hassl.
- Euphorbia arguta Banks & Sol.
- Euphorbia arida N.E.Br.
- Euphorbia ariensis Kunth
- Euphorbia aristata Schmalh.
- Euphorbia arizonica Engelm.
- Euphorbia armourii Millsp.
- Euphorbia armstrongiana Boiss.
- Euphorbia arnottiana Endl.
- Euphorbia arrecta N.E.Br.
- Euphorbia arteagae W.R.Buck & Huft
- Euphorbia articulata Aubl.
- Euphorbia arvalis Boiss. & Heldr.
- Euphorbia asclepiadea Milne-Redh.
- Euphorbia aserbajdzhanica Bordz.
- Euphorbia asthenacantha S.Carter
- Euphorbia astrachanica C.A.Mey. ex Trautv.
- Euphorbia astyla Engelm. ex Boiss.
- Euphorbia atimovatae Haev. & Hett.
- Euphorbia atoto G.Forst.
- Euphorbia atrocarmesina L.C.Leach
- Euphorbia atrococca A.Heller
- Euphorbia atroflora S.Carter
- Euphorbia atropurpurea Brouss. ex Willd.
- Euphorbia atrox F.K.Horw. ex S.Carter
- Euphorbia attastoma Rizzini
- Euphorbia aucheri Boiss.
- Euphorbia audissoui Marx
- Euphorbia aulacosperma Boiss.
- Euphorbia aureoviridiflora (Rauh) Rauh
- Euphorbia australis Boiss.
- Euphorbia austriaca A.Kern.
- Euphorbia austro-occidentalis Thell.
- Euphorbia austroanatolica Hub.-Mor. & M.S.Khan
- Euphorbia austroiranica Pahlevani
- Euphorbia austrotexana Mayfield
- Euphorbia avasmontana Dinter
- Euphorbia awashensis M.G.Gilbert
- Euphorbia azorica Hochst.

== B ==
- Euphorbia baga A.Chev.
- Euphorbia bagyrensis Stepanov
- Euphorbia bahiensis (Klotzsch & Garcke) Boiss.
- Euphorbia baioensis S.Carter
- Euphorbia balakrishnanii Binojk. & Gopalan
- Euphorbia balbisii Boiss.
- Euphorbia balcanica Sharovikj Ivanova & Frajman
- Euphorbia baleensis M.G.Gilbert
- Euphorbia ballyana Rauh
- Euphorbia ballyi S.Carter
- Euphorbia balsamifera Aiton
- Euphorbia banae Rauh
- Euphorbia baradii S.Carter
- Euphorbia barbicollis P.R.O.Bally
- Euphorbia bariensis S.Carter
- Euphorbia barnardii A.C.White, R.A.Dyer & B.Sloane
- Euphorbia barnesii (Millsp.) Oudejans
- Euphorbia barrelieri Savi
- Euphorbia bartolomaei Greene
- Euphorbia basarabica Prodan
- Euphorbia basargica Prodan
- Euphorbia baueri Engelm. ex Boiss.
- Euphorbia baylissii L.C.Leach
- Euphorbia beamanii M.C.Johnst.
- Euphorbia beckii V.W.Steinm.
- Euphorbia begardii (Cremers) Haev. & Hett.
- Euphorbia beharensis Leandri
- Euphorbia beillei A.Chev.
- Euphorbia belagaviensis Sarojin. & Raja Kullayisw.
- Euphorbia belgheisi Pahlevani
- Euphorbia belgradica Forssk.
- Euphorbia bemarahaensis Rauh & Mangelsdorff
- Euphorbia benthamii Hiern
- Euphorbia berevoensis Lawant & Buddens.
- Euphorbia bergeri N.E.Br.
- Euphorbia bernadettae J.-P.Castillon
- Euphorbia berorohae Rauh & Hofstätter
- Euphorbia berotica N.E.Br.
- Euphorbia berryi V.W.Steinm.
- Euphorbia bertemariae Bisseret & Dioli
- Euphorbia berteroana Balb. ex Spreng.
- Euphorbia berthelotii Bolle ex Boiss.
- Euphorbia berythea Boiss. & C.I.Blanche
- Euphorbia besseri (Klotzsch & Garcke) Boiss.
- Euphorbia betacea Baill.
- Euphorbia betrokana J.-P.Castillon & J.-B.Castillon
- Euphorbia betulicortex M.G.Gilbert
- Euphorbia beuginii Rebmann
- Euphorbia bevilaniensis Croizat
- Euphorbia biaculeata Denis
- Euphorbia bianoensis (Malaisse & Lecron) Bruyns
- Euphorbia bicolor Engelm. & A.Gray
- Euphorbia biconvexa Domin
- Euphorbia bifida Hook. & Arn.
- Euphorbia bifurcata Engelm.
- Euphorbia biharamulensis S.Carter
- Euphorbia bilobata Engelm.
- Euphorbia bindloensis (A.Stewart) Ya Yang
- Euphorbia biselegans Bruyns
- Euphorbia bisellenbeckii Bruyns
- Euphorbia bisglobosa Bruyns
- Euphorbia bitataensis M.G.Gilbert
- Euphorbia biumbellata Poir.
- Euphorbia bivonae Steud.
- Euphorbia blatteri Oudejans
- Euphorbia blepharadena O.L.M.Silva & Cordeiro
- Euphorbia blepharophylla Ledeb.
- Euphorbia blodgettii Engelm. ex Hitchc.
- Euphorbia bodenghieniae (Malaisse & Lecron) Bruyns
- Euphorbia boerhaavioides Rusby
- Euphorbia boetica Boiss.
- Euphorbia boinensis Denis ex Humbert & Leandri
- Euphorbia boissieri Baill.
- Euphorbia boiteaui Leandri
- Euphorbia boivinii Boiss.
- Euphorbia bokorensis H.Toyama & Tagane
- Euphorbia bombensis Jacq.
- Euphorbia bongensis Kotschy & Peyr. ex Boiss.
- Euphorbia bongolavensis Rauh
- Euphorbia boophthona C.A.Gardner
- Euphorbia borbonica Boiss.
- Euphorbia borealis Baikov
- Euphorbia borenensis M.G.Gilbert
- Euphorbia boreobaluchestanica Pahlevani
- Euphorbia borodinii Sambuk
- Euphorbia bosseri Leandri
- Euphorbia bottae Boiss.
- Euphorbia bougheyi L.C.Leach
- Euphorbia bourgaeana J.Gay ex Boiss.
- Euphorbia brachycera Engelm.
- Euphorbia brachyphylla Denis
- Euphorbia bracteata Jacq.
- Euphorbia brakdamensis N.E.Br.
- Euphorbia brandegeei Millsp.
- Euphorbia brassii P.I.Forst.
- Euphorbia braunsii N.E.Br.
- Euphorbia bravoana Svent.
- Euphorbia breedlovei V.W.Steinm. & P.Carrillo
- Euphorbia breviarticulata Pax
- Euphorbia brevicornu Pax
- Euphorbia brevis N.E.Br.
- Euphorbia brevitorta P.R.O.Bally
- Euphorbia briquetii Emb. & Maire
- Euphorbia brownii Baill.
- Euphorbia brunellii Chiov.
- Euphorbia bruntii (Proctor) Oudejans
- Euphorbia bruynsii L.C.Leach
- Euphorbia bubalina Boiss.
- Euphorbia buchtormensis Ledeb.
- Euphorbia buhsei Boiss.
- Euphorbia bulbispina Rauh & Razaf.
- Euphorbia bungei Boiss.
- Euphorbia bupleurifolia Jacq.
- Euphorbia bupleuroides Desf.
- Euphorbia buqensis Mazuch, Orlando, Awale, Elmi & V.Vlk
- Euphorbia burchellii Müll.Arg.
- Euphorbia burgeri M.G.Gilbert
- Euphorbia burkartii Bacigalupo
- Euphorbia burmanica Hook.f.
- Euphorbia burmanni E.Mey. ex Boiss.
- Euphorbia buruana Pax
- Euphorbia buschiana Grossh.
- Euphorbia bussei Pax
- Euphorbia buxoides Radcl.-Sm.
- Euphorbia bwambensis S.Carter

== C ==
- Euphorbia cactus Ehrenb. ex Boiss.
- Euphorbia caducifolia Haines
- Euphorbia caeladenia Boiss.
- Euphorbia caerulescens Haw.
- Euphorbia caesia Kar. & Kir.
- Euphorbia calamiformis P.R.O.Bally & S.Carter
- Euphorbia calcarata (Schltdl.) V.W.Steinm.
- Euphorbia calcicola Fernald
- Euphorbia calderoniae V.W.Steinm.
- Euphorbia californica Benth.
- Euphorbia caloderma S.Carter
- Euphorbia calyculata Kunth
- Euphorbia calyptrata Coss. & Kralik
- Euphorbia camagueyensis (Millsp.) Urb.
- Euphorbia cameronii N.E.Br.
- Euphorbia canariensis L.
- Euphorbia candelabrum Welw.
- Euphorbia cannellii L.C.Leach
- Euphorbia canuti Parl.
- Euphorbia cap-saintemariensis Rauh
- Euphorbia capansa Ducke
- Euphorbia caperata McVaugh
- Euphorbia caperonioides R.A.Dyer & P.G.Mey.
- Euphorbia capillaris Gagnep.
- Euphorbia capitellata Engelm.
- Euphorbia capitulata Rchb.
- Euphorbia capmanambatoensis Rauh
- Euphorbia capuronii Ursch & Leandri
- Euphorbia caput-aureum Denis
- Euphorbia caput-medusae L.
- Euphorbia careyi F.Muell.
- Euphorbia carinifolia N.E.Br.
- Euphorbia carinulata P.R.O.Bally & S.Carter
- Euphorbia carissoides F.M.Bailey
- Euphorbia carniolica Jacq.
- Euphorbia carpatica Wol.
- Euphorbia carteriana P.R.O.Bally
- Euphorbia carunculata Waterf.
- Euphorbia carunculifera L.C.Leach
- Euphorbia cashmeriana Royle
- Euphorbia caspica Frajman & Pahlevani
- Euphorbia cassia Boiss.
- Euphorbia cassythoides Boiss.
- Euphorbia catamarcensis (Croizat) Subils
- Euphorbia cataractarum S.Carter
- Euphorbia catenata (S.Carter) Bruyns
- Euphorbia cattimandoo Elliot ex Wight
- Euphorbia caudiculosa Boiss.
- Euphorbia cayensis Millsp.
- Euphorbia celastroides Boiss.
- Euphorbia celata R.A.Dyer
- Euphorbia celerieri (Emb.) Emb. ex Vindt
- Euphorbia centralis B.G.Thomson
- Euphorbia centunculoides Kunth
- Euphorbia ceratocarpa Ten.
- Euphorbia cereiformis L.
- Euphorbia ceroderma I.M.Johnst.
- Euphorbia cerralvensis Maya-Lastra & V.W.Steinm.
- Euphorbia cervicornu Baill.
- Euphorbia cespitosa Lam.
- Euphorbia chaborasia Gomb.
- Euphorbia chaculana Donn.Sm.
- Euphorbia chaetocalyx (Boiss.) Tidestr.
- Euphorbia chamaecaula Weath.
- Euphorbia chamaeclada Ule
- Euphorbia chamaepeplus Boiss. & Gaill.
- Euphorbia chamaerrhodos Boiss.
- Euphorbia chamaesula Boiss.
- Euphorbia chamaesyce L.
- Euphorbia chamaesycoides B.Nord.
- Euphorbia chamanbidensis Nasseh
- Euphorbia chamissonis (Klotzsch & Garcke) Boiss.
- Euphorbia chapmanii Oudejans
- Euphorbia characias L.
- Euphorbia charitontcevii R.Kr.Singh
- Euphorbia charleswilsoniana V.Vlk
- Euphorbia cheiradenia Boiss. & Hohen.
- Euphorbia cheirolepis Fisch. & C.A.Mey. ex Karelin
- Euphorbia chenopodiifolia Boiss.
- Euphorbia chersonesa Huft
- Euphorbia chevalieri (N.E.Br.) Bruyns
- Euphorbia chiapensis Brandegee
- Euphorbia chiogenes (Small) Oudejans
- Euphorbia chiribensis V.W.Steinm. & Felger
- Euphorbia christophei Rebmann
- Euphorbia cinerascens Engelm.
- Euphorbia cinerea W.Fitzg.
- Euphorbia citrina S.Carter
- Euphorbia clandestina Jacq.
- Euphorbia clarae (Malaisse & Lecron) Bruyns
- Euphorbia clarkeana Hook.f.
- Euphorbia classenii P.R.O.Bally & S.Carter
- Euphorbia clava Jacq.
- Euphorbia clavarioides Boiss.
- Euphorbia clavidigitata Gage
- Euphorbia clavigera N.E.Br.
- Euphorbia claytonioides Pax
- Euphorbia clementei Boiss.
- Euphorbia clivicola R.A.Dyer
- Euphorbia clusiifolia Hook. & Arn.
- Euphorbia coalcomanensis (Croizat) V.W.Steinm.
- Euphorbia coccinea B.Heyne ex Roth
- Euphorbia coerulans Pax
- Euphorbia coghlanii F.M.Bailey
- Euphorbia collenetteae Al-Zahrani & El-Karemy
- Euphorbia colletioides Benth.
- Euphorbia colliculina A.C.White, R.A.Dyer & B.Sloane
- Euphorbia colligata V.W.Steinm.
- Euphorbia colorata Engelm.
- Euphorbia colubrina P.R.O.Bally & S.Carter
- Euphorbia columnaris P.R.O.Bally
- Euphorbia commersonii Baill.
- Euphorbia commutata Engelm. ex A.Gray
- Euphorbia comosa Vell.
- Euphorbia compacta (N.E.Br.) R.Kr.Singh
- Euphorbia complanata Warb.
- Euphorbia compressa Boiss.
- Euphorbia concanensis Janarth. & S.R.Yadav
- Euphorbia condylocarpa M.Bieb.
- Euphorbia conferta (Small) B.E.Sm.
- Euphorbia confinalis R.A.Dyer
- Euphorbia congestiflora L.C.Leach
- Euphorbia coniosperma Boiss. & Buhse
- Euphorbia connata Boiss.
- Euphorbia consanguinea Schrenk ex Fisch. & C.A.Mey.
- Euphorbia consoquitlae Brandegee
- Euphorbia contorta L.C.Leach
- Euphorbia convolvuloides Hochst. ex Benth.
- Euphorbia conzattii V.W.Steinm.
- Euphorbia cooperi N.E.Br. ex A.Berger
- Euphorbia copiapina Phil.
- Euphorbia corallioides L.
- Euphorbia cordatella Oudejans
- Euphorbia cordeiroae P.Carrillo & V.W.Steinm.
- Euphorbia cordifolia Elliott
- Euphorbia cornastra (Dressler) Radcl.-Sm.
- Euphorbia corneliae Bruyns
- Euphorbia corniculata R.A.Dyer
- Euphorbia cornigera Boiss.
- Euphorbia corollata L.
- Euphorbia correllii M.C.Johnst.
- Euphorbia correntina Parodi
- Euphorbia corsica Req.
- Euphorbia cossoniana Boiss.
- Euphorbia cotinifolia L.
- Euphorbia cowellii (Millsp. ex Britton) Oudejans
- Euphorbia cozumelensis Millsp.
- Euphorbia craspedia Boiss.
- Euphorbia crassa (Cremers) Haev. & Hett.
- Euphorbia crassicaulis (Rauh) Haev. & Hett.
- Euphorbia crassimarginata Halford & W.K.Harris
- Euphorbia crassinodis Urb.
- Euphorbia crassipes Marloth
- Euphorbia creberrima McVaugh
- Euphorbia cremersii Rauh & Razaf.
- Euphorbia crenata (N.E.Br.) Bruyns
- Euphorbia crenulata Engelm.
- Euphorbia crepitata L.C.Wheeler
- Euphorbia crepuscula (L.C.Wheeler) Steinm. & Felger
- Euphorbia cressoides M.C.Johnst.
- Euphorbia cristata B.Heyne ex Roth
- Euphorbia crossadenia Pax & K.Hoffm.
- Euphorbia crotonoides Boiss.
- Euphorbia cruentata Graham
- Euphorbia crypta Ewest
- Euphorbia cryptocaulis M.G.Gilbert
- Euphorbia cryptorubra N.C.Taylor & M.Terry
- Euphorbia cryptospinosa P.R.O.Bally
- Euphorbia cubensis Boiss.
- Euphorbia cuchumatanensis Standl. & Steyerm.
- Euphorbia culminicola Ant.Molina
- Euphorbia cumbrae Boiss.
- Euphorbia cumulata R.A.Dyer
- Euphorbia cumulicola (Small) Oudejans
- Euphorbia cuneata Vahl
- Euphorbia cuneifolia Guss.
- Euphorbia cuneneana L.C.Leach
- Euphorbia cuphosperma (Engelm.) Boiss.
- Euphorbia cupricola (Malaisse & Lecron) Bruyns
- Euphorbia cuprispina S.Carter
- Euphorbia cupularis Boiss.
- Euphorbia currorii N.E.Br.
- Euphorbia curtisii Engelm.
- Euphorbia cuspidata Bertol.
- Euphorbia cussonioides P.R.O.Bally
- Euphorbia cyanofolia Ewest
- Euphorbia cyathophora Murray
- Euphorbia cylindrica Marloth ex A.C.White, R.A.Dyer & B.Sloane
- Euphorbia cylindrifolia Marn.-Lap. & Rauh
- Euphorbia cylindroclada Haev. & Hett.
- Euphorbia cymbifera (Schltdl.) V.W.Steinm.
- Euphorbia cymbiformis Rusby
- Euphorbia cymosa Poir.
- Euphorbia cyparissias L.
- Euphorbia cyparissioides Pax
- Euphorbia cyri V.W.Steinm.
- Euphorbia cyrtophylla (Prokh.) Prokh.
- Euphorbia czerepanovii Geltman

== D ==
- Euphorbia daghestanica Geltman
- Euphorbia dahurica Peschkova
- Euphorbia dalettiensis M.G.Gilbert
- Euphorbia dallachyana Baill.
- Euphorbia damarana L.C.Leach
- Euphorbia damasoi Oudejans
- Euphorbia darbandensis N.E.Br.
- Euphorbia dasyacantha S.Carter
- Euphorbia dauana S.Carter
- Euphorbia davidii Subils
- Euphorbia daviesii E.A.Bruce
- Euphorbia davisii M.L.S.Khan
- Euphorbia davyi N.E.Br.
- Euphorbia dawei N.E.Br.
- Euphorbia debilispina L.C.Leach
- Euphorbia decaryi Guillaumin
- Euphorbia deccanensis V.S.Raju
- Euphorbia decepta N.E.Br.
- Euphorbia decidua P.R.O.Bally & L.C.Leach
- Euphorbia decorsei Drake
- Euphorbia dedzana L.C.Leach
- Euphorbia deflexa Sm.
- Euphorbia defoliata Urb.
- Euphorbia degeneri Sherff
- Euphorbia deightonii Croizat
- Euphorbia dekindtii Pax
- Euphorbia delicatissima S.Carter
- Euphorbia delicatula Boiss.
- Euphorbia delphinensis Ursch & Leandri
- Euphorbia deltobracteata (Prokh.) Prokh.
- Euphorbia deltoidea Engelm. ex Chapm.
- Euphorbia demissa L.C.Leach
- Euphorbia dendroides L.
- Euphorbia denisiana Guillaumin
- Euphorbia denisii Oudejans
- Euphorbia densa Schrenk
- Euphorbia densiflora (Klotzsch) Klotzsch
- Euphorbia densispina S.Carter
- Euphorbia densiuscula Popov
- Euphorbia densiusculiformis (Pazij) Botsch.
- Euphorbia dentata Michx.
- Euphorbia denticulata Lam.
- Euphorbia dentosa I.M.Johnst.
- Euphorbia depauperata Hochst. ex A.Rich.
- Euphorbia deppeana Boiss.
- Euphorbia derickii V.W.Steinm.
- Euphorbia derksenii van Jaarsv. & Marx
- Euphorbia descampsii (Pax) Bruyns
- Euphorbia desmondii Keay & Milne-Redh.
- Euphorbia dhofarensis S.Carter
- Euphorbia diazlunana (J.Lomelí & Sahagun) V.W.Steinm.
- Euphorbia dichroa S.Carter
- Euphorbia didiereoides Denis ex Leandri
- Euphorbia digestiva Rojas Acosta
- Euphorbia dilloniana Haager & Šedivá
- Euphorbia dilobadena S.Carter
- Euphorbia dilunguensis (Malaisse & Lecron) Bruyns
- Euphorbia diminuta S.Carter
- Euphorbia dimorphocaulon P.H.Davis
- Euphorbia dioeca Kunth
- Euphorbia dioscoreoides Boiss.
- Euphorbia discoidalis Chapm.
- Euphorbia discoidea (P.R.O.Bally) Bruyns
- Euphorbia discrepans S.Carter
- Euphorbia dispersa L.C.Leach
- Euphorbia dissitispina L.C.Leach
- Euphorbia distinctissima L.C.Leach
- Euphorbia diuretica Larrañaga
- Euphorbia djimilensis Boiss.
- Euphorbia dolichoceras S.Carter
- Euphorbia doloensis M.G.Gilbert
- Euphorbia douliotii (Poiss.) J.-P.Castillon
- Euphorbia dracunculoides Lam.
- Euphorbia dregeana E.Mey. ex Boiss.
- Euphorbia dressleri V.W.Steinm.
- Euphorbia drummondii Boiss.
- Euphorbia drupifera Thonn.
- Euphorbia dubovikiae Oudejans
- Euphorbia duckei (Croizat) Oudejans
- Euphorbia duerrii Sarojin. & Raja Kullayisw.
- Euphorbia dugandiana Croizat
- Euphorbia dulcis L.
- Euphorbia dumalis S.Carter
- Euphorbia dumeticola P.R.O.Bally & S.Carter
- Euphorbia dumosoides Bruyns
- Euphorbia dunensis S.Carter
- Euphorbia durandoi Chabert
- Euphorbia duranii Ursch & Leandri
- Euphorbia durispina Haev. & Hett.
- Euphorbia duriuscula Pax & K.Hoffm. ex Herzog
- Euphorbia duseimata R.A.Dyer
- Euphorbia dussii Krug & Urb. ex Duss
- Euphorbia duvalii Lecoq & Lamotte
- Euphorbia dwyeri D.G.Burch

== E ==
- Euphorbia eanophylla Croizat
- Euphorbia ebracteolata Hayata
- Euphorbia echinulata (Stapf) Bruyns
- Euphorbia ecklonii (Klotzsch & Garcke) Baill.
- Euphorbia ecorniculata Kitam.
- Euphorbia edgeworthii Boiss.
- Euphorbia edmondii Hochr.
- Euphorbia eduardoi L.C.Leach
- Euphorbia eggersii Urb.
- Euphorbia eglandulosa V.W.Steinm.
- Euphorbia eichleri Müll.Arg.
- Euphorbia eilensis S.Carter
- Euphorbia elastica Jum.
- Euphorbia elburensis Baldesi & S.Carter
- Euphorbia eleanoriae (D.H.Lorence & W.L.Wagner) Govaerts
- Euphorbia elegans Spreng.
- Euphorbia elegantissima P.R.O.Bally & S.Carter
- Euphorbia ellenbeckii Pax
- Euphorbia ellipsifolia Gilli
- Euphorbia elliptica Lam.
- Euphorbia elodes Boiss.
- Euphorbia elquiensis Phil.
- Euphorbia elymaitica Bornm.
- Euphorbia emetica Padilla
- Euphorbia emirnensis Baker
- Euphorbia engelmannii Boiss.
- Euphorbia engleri Pax
- Euphorbia enormis N.E.Br.
- Euphorbia ensifolia Baker
- Euphorbia ephedroides E.Mey. ex Boiss.
- Euphorbia ephedromorpha Bartlett
- Euphorbia epiphylloides Kurz
- Euphorbia epithymoides L.
- Euphorbia equisetiformis A.Stewart
- Euphorbia eranthes R.A.Dyer & Milne-Redh.
- Euphorbia eriantha Benth.
- Euphorbia erigavensis S.Carter
- Euphorbia erinacea Boiss. & Kotschy
- Euphorbia eriophora Boiss.
- Euphorbia erlangeri Pax
- Euphorbia erubescens Boiss.
- Euphorbia erythradenia Boiss.
- Euphorbia erythrocephala P.R.O.Bally & Milne-Redh.
- Euphorbia erythroclada Boiss.
- Euphorbia erythrocucullata Mangelsdorff
- Euphorbia erythrodon Boiss. & Heldr.
- Euphorbia erythroxyloides Baker
- Euphorbia esculenta Marloth
- Euphorbia espinosa Pax
- Euphorbia estevesii N.Zimm. & P.J.Braun
- Euphorbia esula L.
- Euphorbia esuliformis S.Schauer
- Euphorbia etuberculosa P.R.O.Bally & S.Carter
- Euphorbia eugeniae Prokh.
- Euphorbia euonymoclada Croizat
- Euphorbia excelsa A.C.White, R.A.Dyer & B.Sloane
- Euphorbia excisa Urb. & Ekman
- Euphorbia exigua L.
- Euphorbia exilis L.C.Leach
- Euphorbia exilispina S.Carter
- Euphorbia exserta (Small) Coker
- Euphorbia exstipulata Engelm.
- Euphorbia eyassiana P.R.O.Bally & S.Carter
- Euphorbia eylesii Rendle

== F ==
- Euphorbia falcata L.
- Euphorbia famatamboay F.Friedmann & Cremers
- Euphorbia fanjahiraensis Haev. & Hett.
- Euphorbia fanshawei L.C.Leach
- Euphorbia fascicaulis S.Carter
- Euphorbia fasciculata Thunb.
- Euphorbia faucicola L.C.Leach
- Euphorbia fauriei H.Lév. & Vaniot
- Euphorbia feddemae McVaugh
- Euphorbia fendleri Torr. & A.Gray
- Euphorbia ferdinandi Baill.
- Euphorbia ferdowsiana Pahlevani
- Euphorbia ferganensis B.Fedtsch.
- Euphorbia ferox Marloth
- Euphorbia fianarantsoae Ursch & Leandri
- Euphorbia fiherenensis Poiss.
- Euphorbia filicaulis Urb.
- Euphorbia filiflora Marloth
- Euphorbia filiformis (P.R.O.Bally) Bruyns
- Euphorbia fimbrilligera Mart.
- Euphorbia finkii (Boiss.) V.W.Steinm.
- Euphorbia fischeri Pax
- Euphorbia fischeriana Steud.
- Euphorbia fissispina P.R.O.Bally & S.Carter
- Euphorbia fistulosa M.L.S.Khan
- Euphorbia fitzroyensis Halford & W.K.Harris
- Euphorbia flanaganii N.E.Br.
- Euphorbia flaviana Carn.-Torres & Cordeiro
- Euphorbia flavicoma DC.
- Euphorbia flindersica Halford & W.K.Harris
- Euphorbia floribunda Engelm. ex Boiss.
- Euphorbia florida Engelm.
- Euphorbia floridana Chapm.
- Euphorbia fluminis S.Carter
- Euphorbia foliolosa Boiss.
- Euphorbia fontqueriana Greuter
- Euphorbia forolensis L.E.Newton
- Euphorbia forskaolii J.Gay
- Euphorbia fortissima L.C.Leach
- Euphorbia fortuita A.C.White, R.A.Dyer & B.Sloane
- Euphorbia fosbergii (J.Florence) Govaerts
- Euphorbia fractiflexa S.Carter & J.R.I.Wood
- Euphorbia fragifera Jan
- Euphorbia franchetii B.Fedtsch.
- Euphorbia franckiana A.Berger
- Euphorbia francoana Boiss.
- Euphorbia frankii Lavranos
- Euphorbia fraseri Boiss.
- Euphorbia friedrichiae Dinter
- Euphorbia friesii (N.E.Br.) Bruyns
- Euphorbia friesiorum (A.Hässl.) S.Carter
- Euphorbia fruticosa Forssk.
- Euphorbia fruticulosa Engelm. ex Boiss.
- Euphorbia fuentesii V.W.Steinm.
- Euphorbia fulgens Karw. ex Klotzsch
- Euphorbia furcata N.E.Br.
- Euphorbia furcatifolia M.G.Gilbert
- Euphorbia furcillata Kunth
- Euphorbia fuscoclada Haev. & Hett.
- Euphorbia fuscolanata Gilli
- Euphorbia fusiformis Buch.-Ham. ex D.Don
- Euphorbia fwambensis (N.E.Br.) Bruyns
