= Euphorbia boissieri =

Conservation status
- Vulnerable (IUCN 3.1)

Scientific classification
- Kingdom: Plantae
- Clade: Tracheophytes
- Clade: Angiosperms
- Clade: Eudicots
- Clade: Rosids
- Order: Malpighiales
- Family: Euphorbiaceae
- Genus: Euphorbia
- Species: E. boissieri

Binomial name
- Euphorbia boissieri Baill.

Species of flowering plant

Euphorbia boissieri is a species of plant in the family Euphorbiaceae. It is endemic to Madagascar. Its natural habitat is subtropical or tropical moist lowland forests. It is threatened by habitat loss. A political crisis in 2009 also plunged Madagascar wildlife into a desperate state. It is named after botanist Pierre Edmond Boissier.
