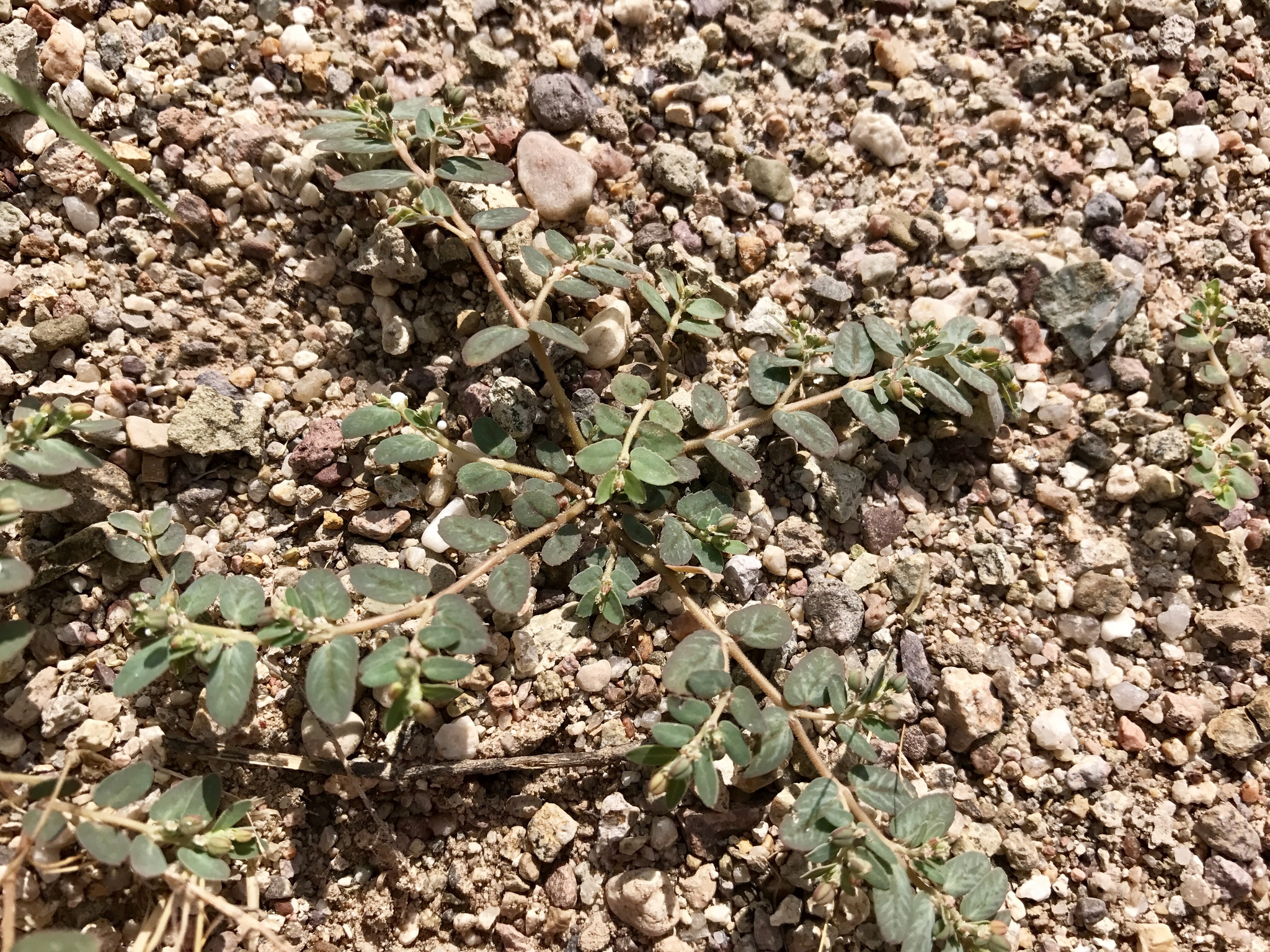

Scientific classification
- Kingdom: Plantae
- Clade: Tracheophytes
- Clade: Angiosperms
- Clade: Eudicots
- Clade: Rosids
- Order: Malpighiales
- Family: Euphorbiaceae
- Genus: Euphorbia
- Species: E. abramsiana

Binomial name
- Euphorbia abramsiana L.C.Wheeler

Synonyms
- Chamaesyce abramsiana (L.C.Wheeler) Koutnik; Euphorbia pediculifera var. abramsiana (L.C.Wheeler) Ewan

= Euphorbia abramsiana =

Species of plant found in California

Euphorbia abramsiana, commonly known as Abram's spurge or Abram's sandmat, is a species of plant in the family Euphorbiaceae native to California.
