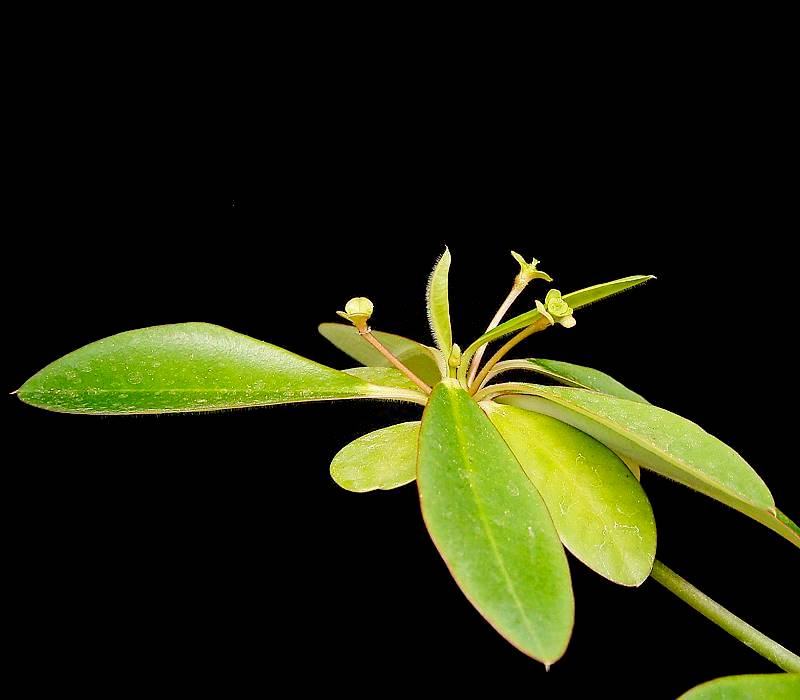

Scientific classification
- Kingdom: Plantae
- Clade: Embryophytes
- Clade: Tracheophytes
- Clade: Spermatophytes
- Clade: Angiosperms
- Clade: Eudicots
- Clade: Rosids
- Order: Malpighiales
- Family: Euphorbiaceae
- Genus: Euphorbia
- Species: E. commersonii

Binomial name
- Euphorbia commersonii Baill.

Synonyms
- Euphorbia elliotii Leandri

= Euphorbia commersonii =

Plant species in the spurge family

Euphorbia commersonii is a species from southeast of the island country of Madagascar.

== Description ==
Euphorbia commersonii is a freely branching shrub that grows to 1.5 meters in height and has a tuberous root when young. It tends to have very few upright branches and more branches that grow horizontally. Its leaves are as much as 4 cm long and 3 cm wide with and obovate, tear drop shaped with the tapering end attaching to the leaf stem. The inflorescences are crowded together at the ends of the branches.

== Taxonomy ==
In 1886 Henri Ernest Baillon scientifically described a new species in the genus Euphorbia which he named Euphorbia commersonii. Together with its genus it is classified in the Euphorbiaceae family. It has no subspecies and one heterotypic synonym, Euphorbia elliotii, which was described by Jacques Désiré Leandri in 1945. Although listed as a synonym by Plants of the World Online (POWO), Euphorbia elliotii continues to be listed as an endangered species by the IUCN having been assessed in 2019 and updated in 2020. However, a new species named Euphorbia neoelliotii was described in 2018 by Jean-Philippe Castillon and Jean-Bernard Castillon and is listed as accepted by POWO, which they described in the same paper where they came to the conclusion that Euphorbia elliotii was a later synonym.

== Range ==
Euphorbia commersonii is endemic to the area around Fort-Dauphin in southeastern Madagascar. It grows in sandy soils in the coastal forests.

== Uses ==
Though it is not a succulent plant, it is grown by succulent plant enthusiasts due to its tuber-like root.
