= Euphorbia cussonioides =

Conservation status
- Critically Endangered (IUCN 3.1)
- CITES Appendix II (CITES)

Scientific classification
- Kingdom: Plantae
- Clade: Tracheophytes
- Clade: Angiosperms
- Clade: Eudicots
- Clade: Rosids
- Order: Malpighiales
- Family: Euphorbiaceae
- Genus: Euphorbia
- Species: E. cussonioides

Binomial name
- Euphorbia cussonioides P.R.O.Bally

Species of flowering plant

Euphorbia cussonioides is a species of plant in the family Euphorbiaceae. It is endemic to Kenya. It goes by the common name the Candelabra tree.
