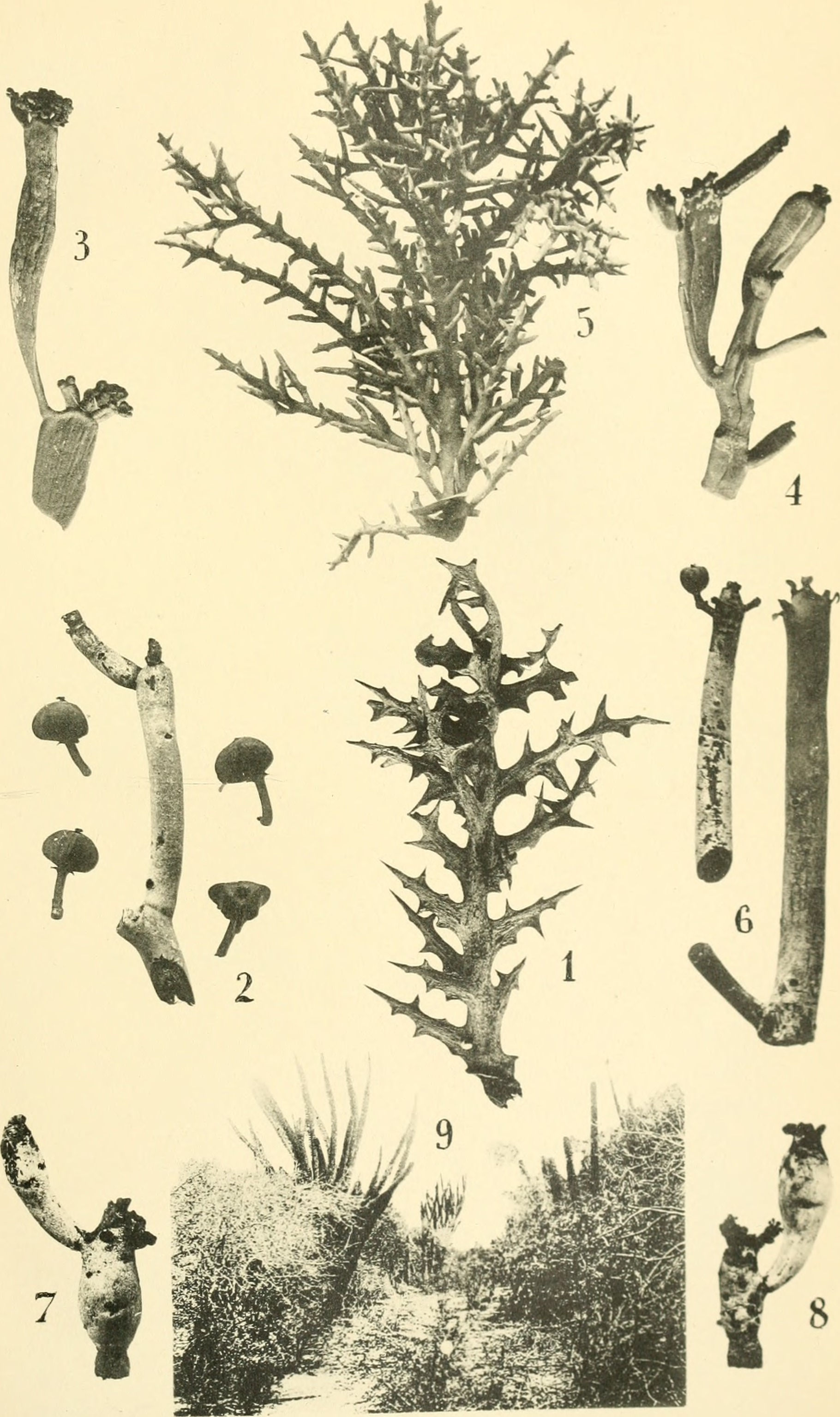
- Fig. 2 - Euphorbia decorsei: Tip of a fruiting branch. On the right and left, trigonal fruits showing the small collar at the base.

Conservation status
- Endangered (IUCN 3.1)

Scientific classification
- Kingdom: Plantae
- Clade: Tracheophytes
- Clade: Angiosperms
- Clade: Eudicots
- Clade: Rosids
- Order: Malpighiales
- Family: Euphorbiaceae
- Genus: Euphorbia
- Species: E. decorsei

Binomial name
- Euphorbia decorsei Drake

= Euphorbia decorsei =

Species of flowering plant

Euphorbia decorsei is a species of plant in the family Euphorbiaceae. It is endemic to Madagascar and its natural habitat is subtropical or tropical dry forests. However, it is threatened by habitat loss.
