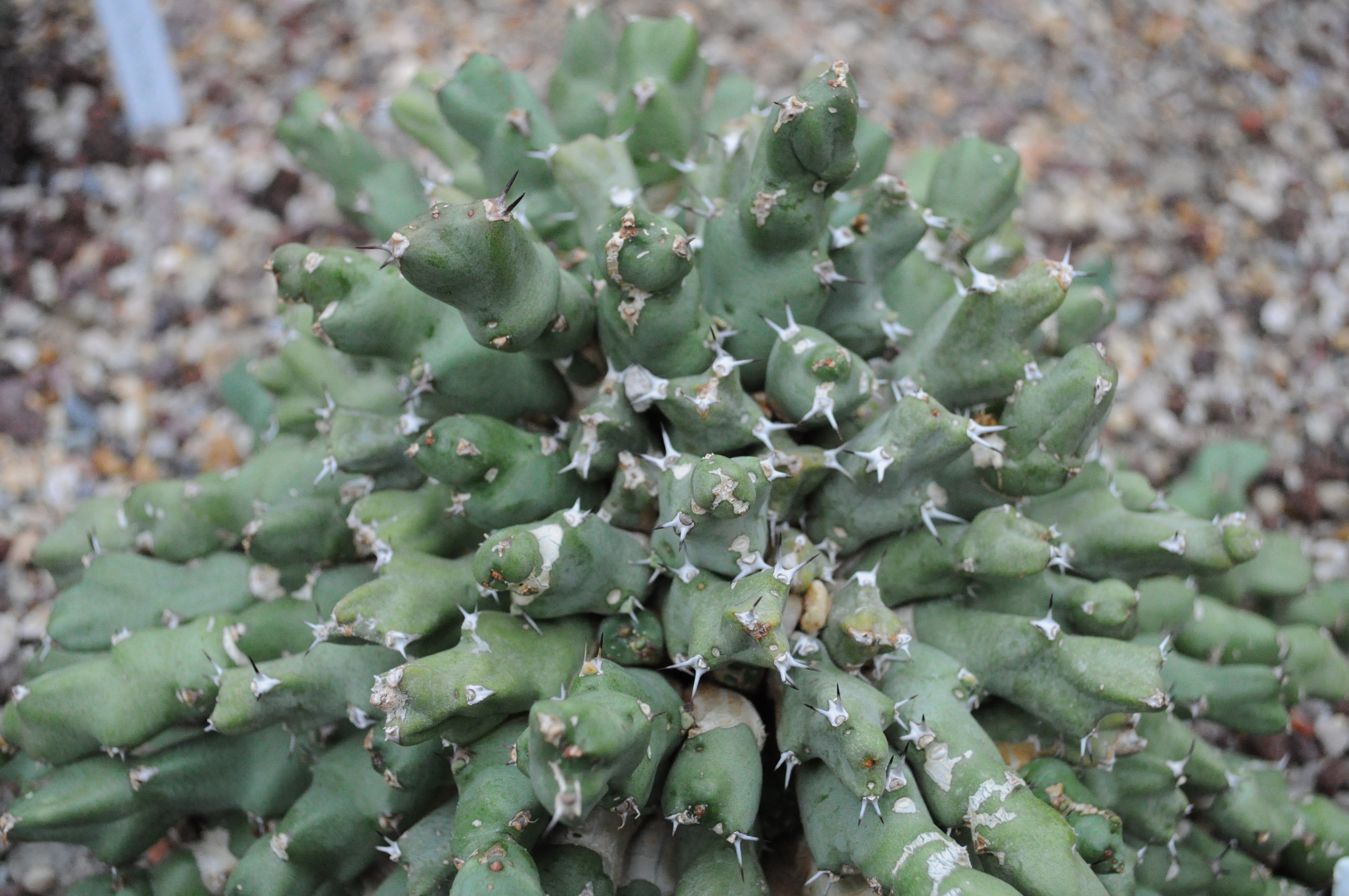

Scientific classification
- Kingdom: Plantae
- Clade: Tracheophytes
- Clade: Angiosperms
- Clade: Eudicots
- Clade: Rosids
- Order: Malpighiales
- Family: Euphorbiaceae
- Genus: Euphorbia
- Species: E. clivicola

Binomial name
- Euphorbia clivicola R.A.Dyer

= Euphorbia clivicola =

Species of succulent plant found in southern Africa

Euphorbia clivicola is a species of plant in the family Euphorbiaceae native to southern Africa.
