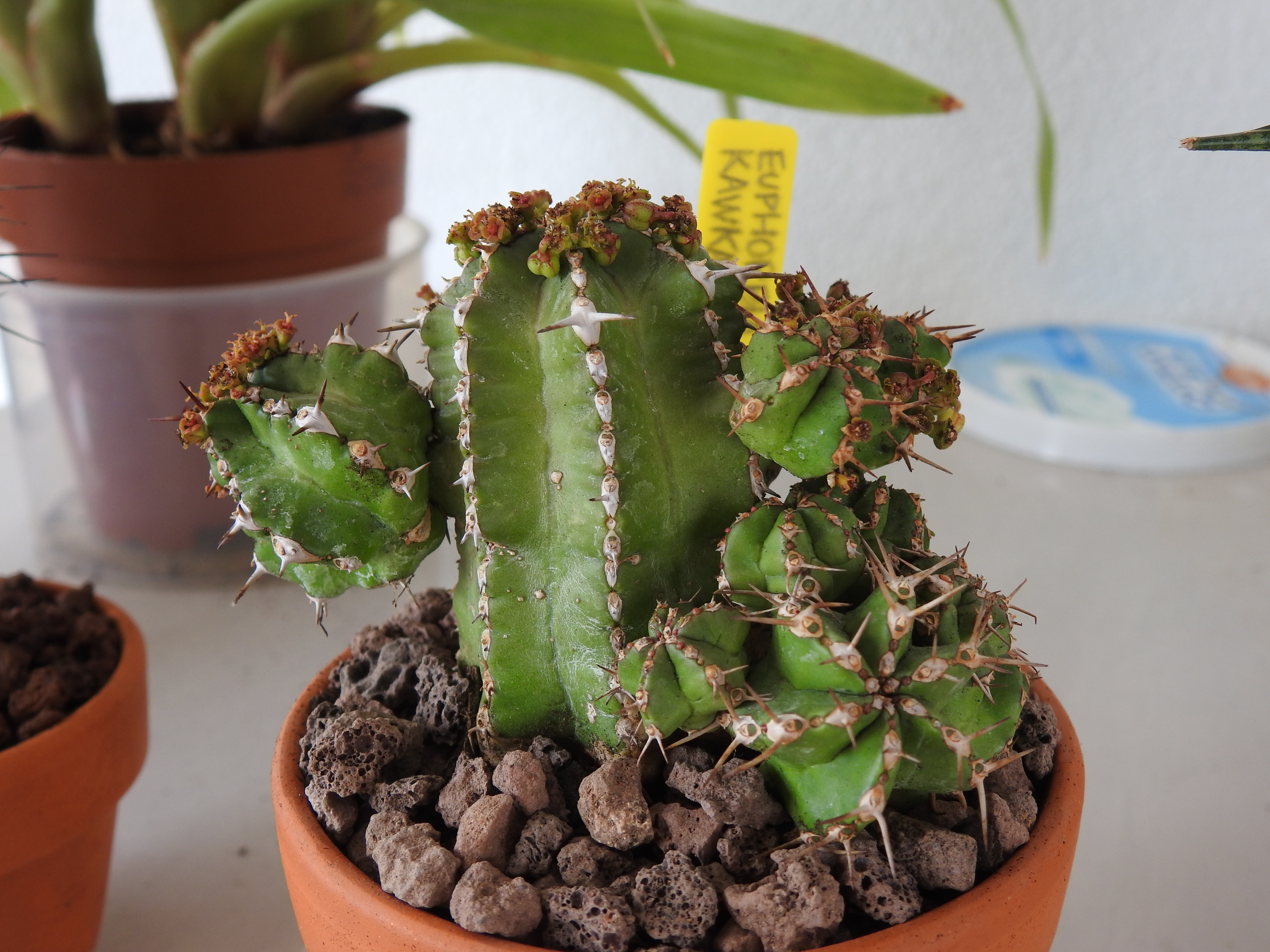
- Euphorbia frankii in cultivation
- CITES Appendix II

Scientific classification
- Kingdom: Plantae
- Clade: Embryophytes
- Clade: Tracheophytes
- Clade: Spermatophytes
- Clade: Angiosperms
- Clade: Eudicots
- Clade: Rosids
- Order: Malpighiales
- Family: Euphorbiaceae
- Genus: Euphorbia
- Species: E. frankii

Binomial name
- Euphorbia frankii Lavranos

= Euphorbia frankii =

Species of flowering plant

Euphorbia frankii is a species of flowering plant in the Euphorbiaceae family. It is a succulent spurge native to northern Yemen.

Euphorbia frankii was initially considered a dwarf highland form of Euphorbia fruticosa, but was described as a new species in 2005.
