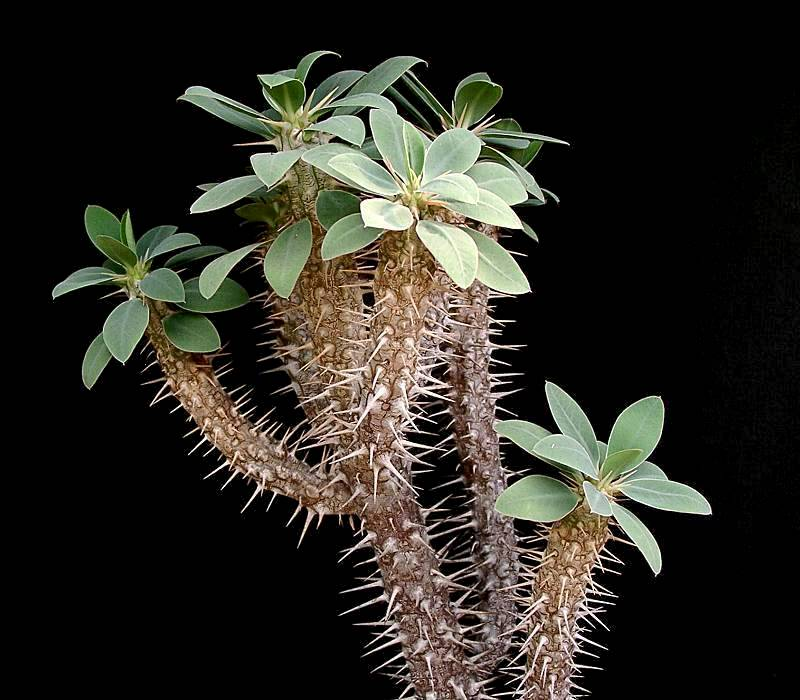

Conservation status
- Vulnerable (IUCN 3.1)

Scientific classification
- Kingdom: Plantae
- Clade: Tracheophytes
- Clade: Angiosperms
- Clade: Eudicots
- Clade: Rosids
- Order: Malpighiales
- Family: Euphorbiaceae
- Genus: Euphorbia
- Species: E. fianarantsoae

Binomial name
- Euphorbia fianarantsoae Ursch & Leandri

= Euphorbia fianarantsoae =

Species of flowering plant

Euphorbia fianarantsoae is a species of flowering plant in the family Euphorbiaceae. It is endemic to Madagascar. Its natural habitat is rocky areas. It is threatened by habitat loss.
