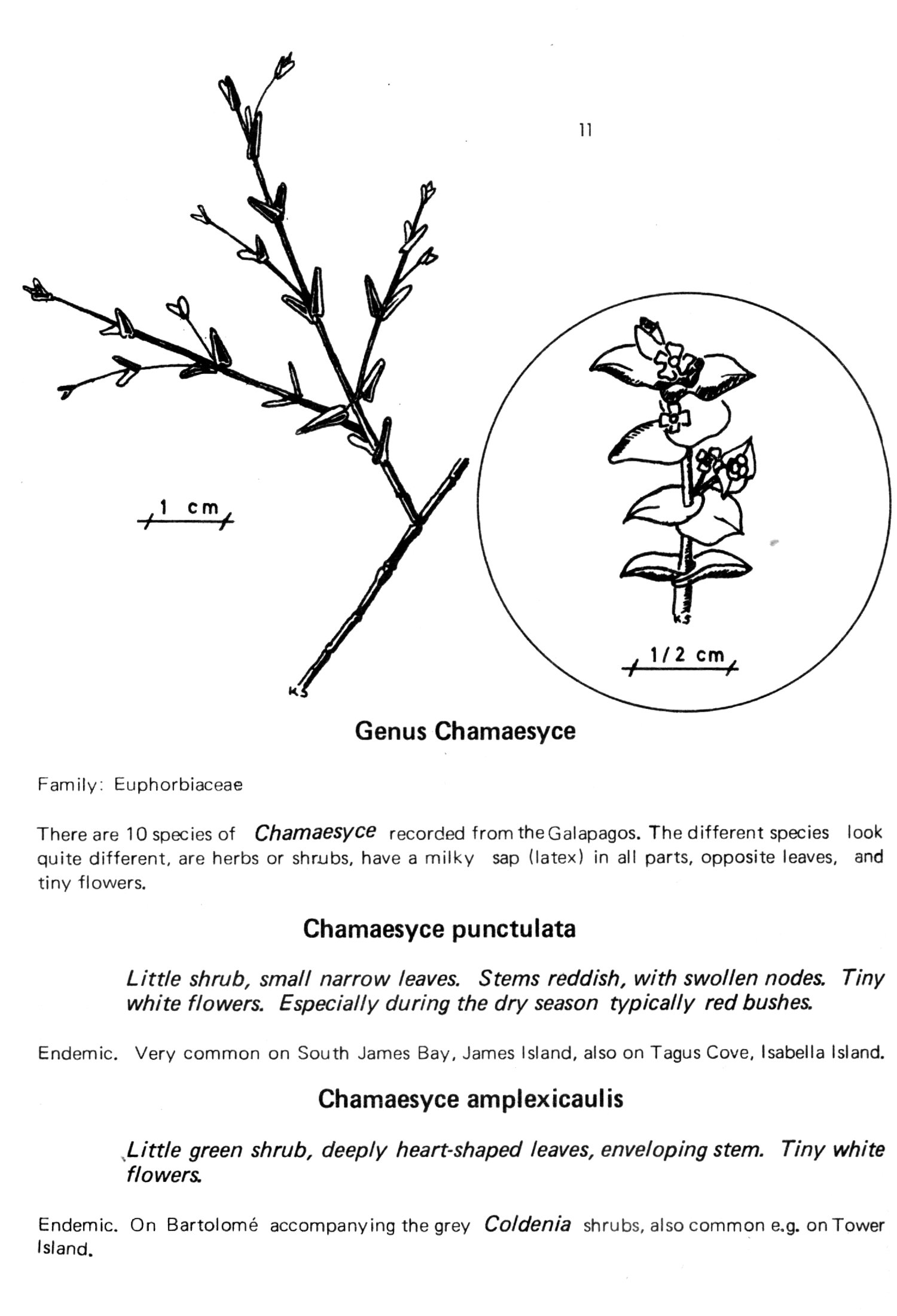

Scientific classification
- Kingdom: Plantae
- Clade: Tracheophytes
- Clade: Angiosperms
- Clade: Eudicots
- Clade: Rosids
- Order: Malpighiales
- Family: Euphorbiaceae
- Genus: Euphorbia
- Species: E. amplexicaulis

Binomial name
- Euphorbia amplexicaulis Hook.f.

Synonyms
- Chamaesyce amplexicaulis (Hook.f.) D.G.Burch

= Euphorbia amplexicaulis =

Species of plant

Euphorbia amplexicaulis is a species of flowering plant in the family Euphorbiaceae and is endemic to the Galápagos, where it mainly grows in seasonally dry areas. It was first formally described in 1847 by Joseph Dalton Hooker in the Transactions of the Linnean Society of London.
