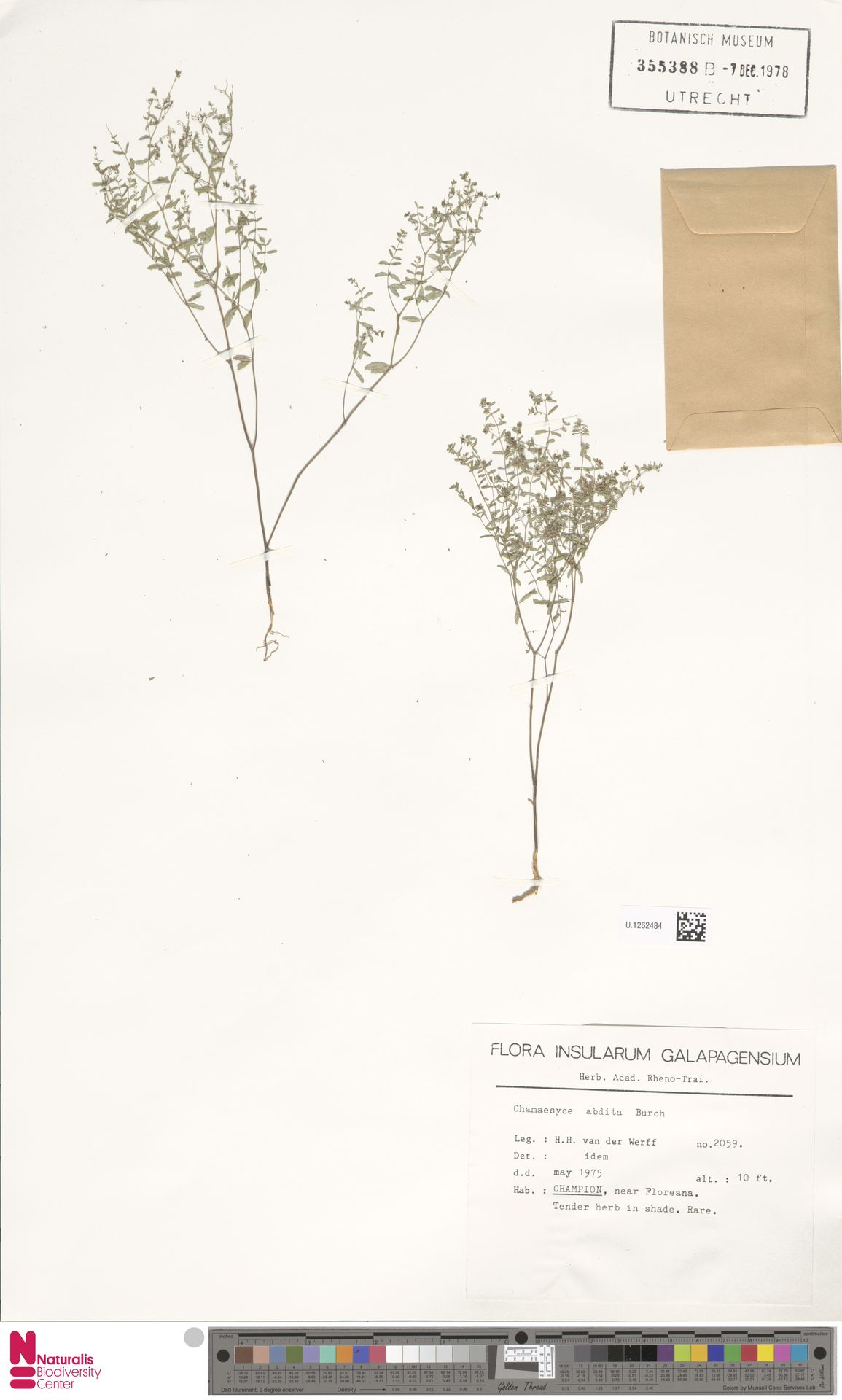

Scientific classification
- Kingdom: Plantae
- Clade: Tracheophytes
- Clade: Angiosperms
- Clade: Eudicots
- Clade: Rosids
- Order: Malpighiales
- Family: Euphorbiaceae
- Genus: Euphorbia
- Species: E. abdita

Binomial name
- Euphorbia abdita (D.G.Burch) Radcl.-Sm. (1971)

Synonyms
- Chamaesyce abdita D.G.Burch (1969)

= Euphorbia abdita =

Species of plant

Euphorbia abdita is a member of the spurge family, Euphorbiaceae. It is endemic to the Galápagos Islands.
