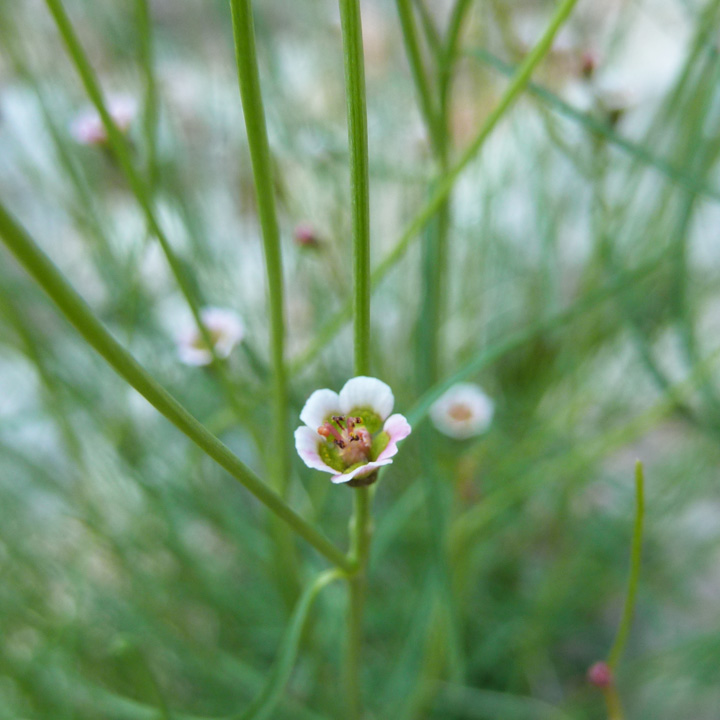
- Flower

Scientific classification
- Kingdom: Plantae
- Clade: Tracheophytes
- Clade: Angiosperms
- Clade: Eudicots
- Clade: Rosids
- Order: Malpighiales
- Family: Euphorbiaceae
- Genus: Euphorbia
- Species: E. aaron-rossii

Binomial name
- Euphorbia aaron-rossii A.H. Holmgren & N.H. Holmgren

= Euphorbia aaron-rossii =

Species of flowering plant

Euphorbia aaron-rossii, also known as the Marble Canyon spurge, is a perennial, herbaceous plant species of Euphorbia native to Arizona. It's most closely related to E. strictior and E. wrightii, but needs more study.

== Description ==
Plants are suffrutescent with densely clustered, erect, wiry stems, including many dead ones persisting from the past season. 2.5–4.5 cm tall and with a width about the same, arising from a woody caudex surmounting a thick taproot. Herbage are ascending, piloss, pubescent, becoming sparsely struggles to glabrous with time and age. Stems are apparently annual (with new growth originating from the caudex), green, longitudinally striate, erect, monopodially branched at vegetative lower nodes, the internodes exceeding the leaves, the floral upper nodes sympodially branched with the main axis terminating in a cyanthium and a lateral branch becoming the leader. Leaves are alternate, with the length of the stipules minute glands being 0.1–0.25 mm long or occasionally obsolete. The petiole is short, being 0.2-2.2 mm long, soon becoming reflexed, usually a pale green or yellowish green. The blade is entire, symmetrical at base being 1–3.2 cm long varying in shape but the lower ones are usually broader and shorter, ovate to lanceolate. taminate flowers 20–25. Pistillate flowers: ovary strigose; styles 1–1.3 mm, 2-fid at apex. Capsules subglobose, 2–3 × 4 mm, sparsely strigose; columella 2–3 mm. Seeds gray-green to gray-brown, globose-ovoid, 1.8–2.2 × 1.2–1.6 mm, longitudinally pitted; caruncle absent.

This plant flowers and fruits in spring-fall. They are native to sandy soils and dunes, occasionally rocky slopes, riparian areas; of conservation concern; 600–1300 m; Ariz.
