= Euphorbia bifida =

Conservation status
- Least Concern (NCA)

Scientific classification
- Kingdom: Plantae
- Clade: Tracheophytes
- Clade: Angiosperms
- Clade: Eudicots
- Clade: Rosids
- Order: Malpighiales
- Family: Euphorbiaceae
- Genus: Euphorbia
- Species: E. bifida

Binomial name
- Euphorbia bifida Hook. & Arn. 1837

Species of flowering plant

Euphorbia bifida is a species of flowering plant in the family Euphorbiaceae that is native to Australia and Papua New Guinea.

== Description ==
It grows as a herb or shrub up to a height of 1 metre. The species fruits and flowers year round. The species is hermaphroditic and has an annual or perennial life cycle.

== Habitat & distribution ==
The species can be found in rainforests, woodlands and sclerophyll forests of Australia from the Kimberley in the northwest to northern New South Wales in the southeast, with occurrence records also confirming the presence of the species in Papua New Guinea.

== Conservation ==
Under the Nature Conservation Act 1992 in Queensland it has been classified as least concern.
