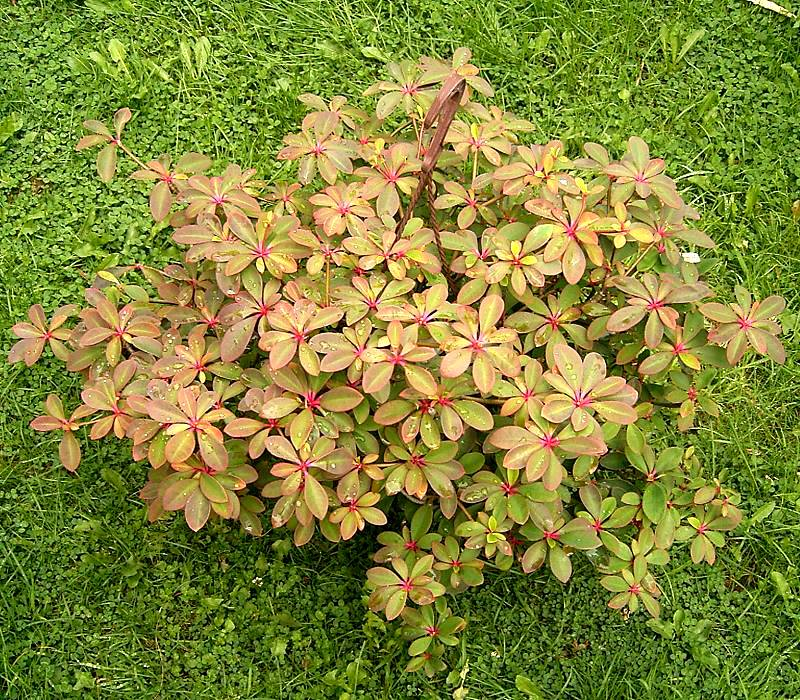

Conservation status
- Endangered (IUCN 3.1)

Scientific classification
- Kingdom: Plantae
- Clade: Tracheophytes
- Clade: Angiosperms
- Clade: Eudicots
- Clade: Rosids
- Order: Malpighiales
- Family: Euphorbiaceae
- Genus: Euphorbia
- Species: E. bongolavensis

Binomial name
- Euphorbia bongolavensis Rauh

= Euphorbia bongolavensis =

Species of flowering plant

Euphorbia bongolavensis is a species of plant in the family Euphorbiaceae. It is endemic to Madagascar. Its natural habitat is subtropical or tropical dry forests. It is currently being threatened by habitat loss.
