= Euphorbia ambarivatoensis =

Conservation status
- Vulnerable (IUCN 3.1)

Scientific classification
- Kingdom: Plantae
- Clade: Tracheophytes
- Clade: Angiosperms
- Clade: Eudicots
- Clade: Rosids
- Order: Malpighiales
- Family: Euphorbiaceae
- Genus: Euphorbia
- Species: E. ambarivatoensis

Binomial name
- Euphorbia ambarivatoensis Raug & Bard.-Vauc.

Species of flowering plant

Euphorbia ambarivatoensis is a species of plant in the family Euphorbiaceae. It is endemic to Madagascar. Its natural habitat is rocky areas. It is threatened by habitat loss.

As most other succulent members of the genus Euphorbia, its trade is regulated under Appendix II of CITES.
