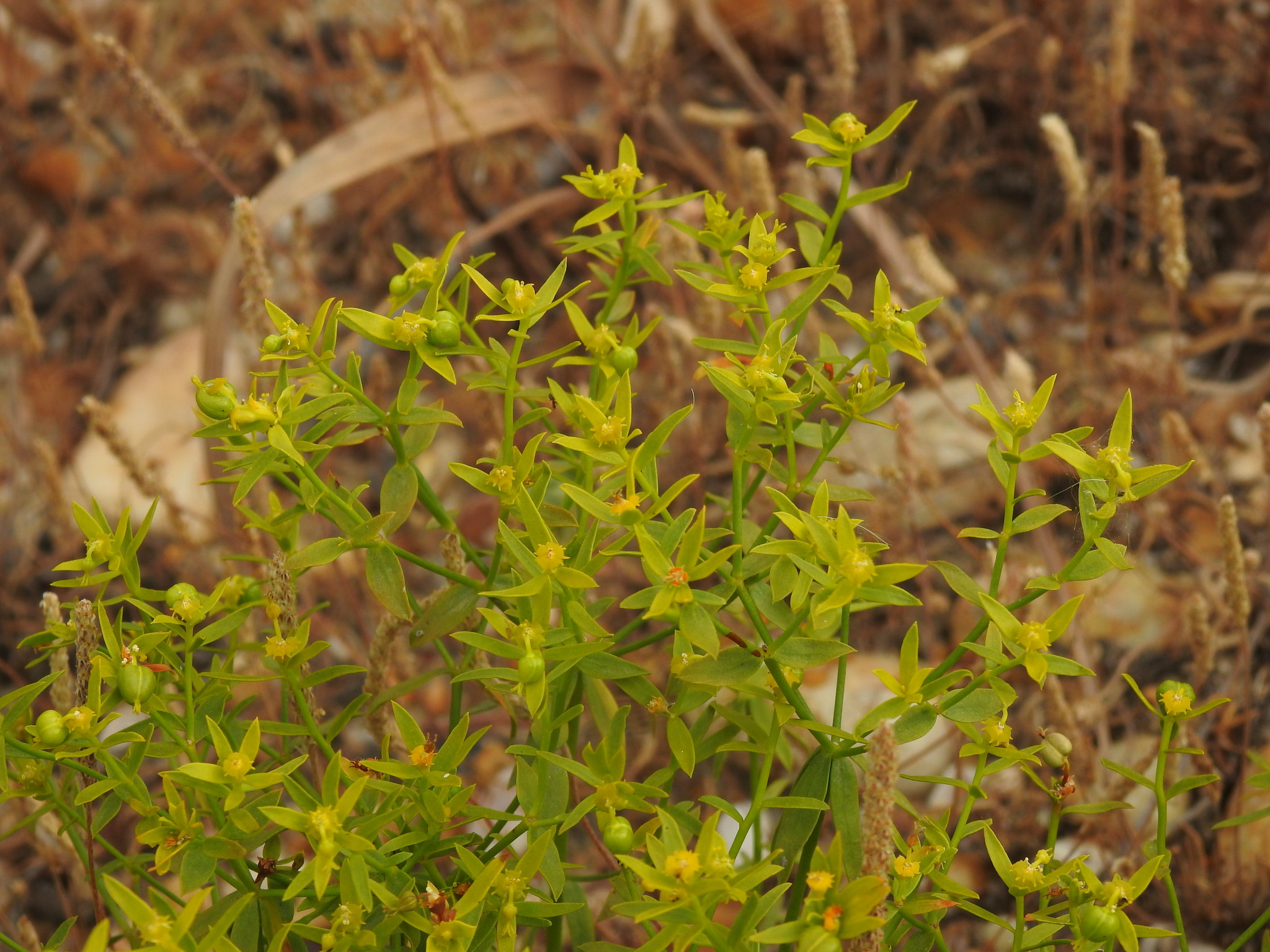

Scientific classification
- Kingdom: Plantae
- Clade: Embryophytes
- Clade: Tracheophytes
- Clade: Spermatophytes
- Clade: Angiosperms
- Clade: Eudicots
- Clade: Rosids
- Order: Malpighiales
- Family: Euphorbiaceae
- Genus: Euphorbia
- Species: E. boetica

Binomial name
- Euphorbia boetica Boiss.

Synonyms
- Euphorbia trinervia Boiss.; Tithymalus boeticus (Boiss.) Samp.; Tithymalus trinervius Klotzsch & Garcke; Euphorbia boetica var. pseudoraromisissima Cout.; Euphorbia carniolica Scop. ex Brot.

= Euphorbia boetica =

Species of flowering plant in the spurge family

Euphorbia boetica is a species of flowering plant in the spurge family Euphorbiaceae. It is endemic to the Iberian Peninsula.
