= Euphorbia boivinii =

Conservation status
- Least Concern (IUCN 3.1)

Scientific classification
- Kingdom: Plantae
- Clade: Embryophytes
- Clade: Tracheophytes
- Clade: Spermatophytes
- Clade: Angiosperms
- Clade: Eudicots
- Clade: Rosids
- Order: Malpighiales
- Family: Euphorbiaceae
- Genus: Euphorbia
- Species: E. boivinii

Binomial name
- Euphorbia boivinii Boiss.

Species of flowering plant

Euphorbia boivinii is a species of plant in the family Euphorbiaceae. It is endemic to Madagascar. Its natural habitat is subtropical or tropical moist lowland forests. It is threatened by habitat loss.

The Latin specific epithet of boivinii refers to French explorer and plant collector Louis Hyacinthe Boivin (1808–1852).
