= Euphorbia acalyphoides =

Scientific classification
- Kingdom: Plantae
- Clade: Tracheophytes
- Clade: Angiosperms
- Clade: Eudicots
- Clade: Rosids
- Order: Malpighiales
- Family: Euphorbiaceae
- Genus: Euphorbia
- Species: E. acalyphoides

Binomial name
- Euphorbia acalyphoides Q5851340

Synonyms
- Tithymalus acalyphoides (Hochst. ex Boiss.) Schweinf.

Species of flowering plant

Euphorbia acalyphoides is a species of plant in the family Euphorbiaceae. It is native to Angola, Chad, Djibouti, Eritrea, Ethiopia, Kenya, Saudi Arabia, Somalia, Sudan, Tanzania, and Yemen. Two subspecies are recognized: E. a. acalyphoides and E. a. cicatricosa.

The plant is an annual herb that grows to 45 cm. high with spreading branches. Leaves are 4 × 2 cm.
