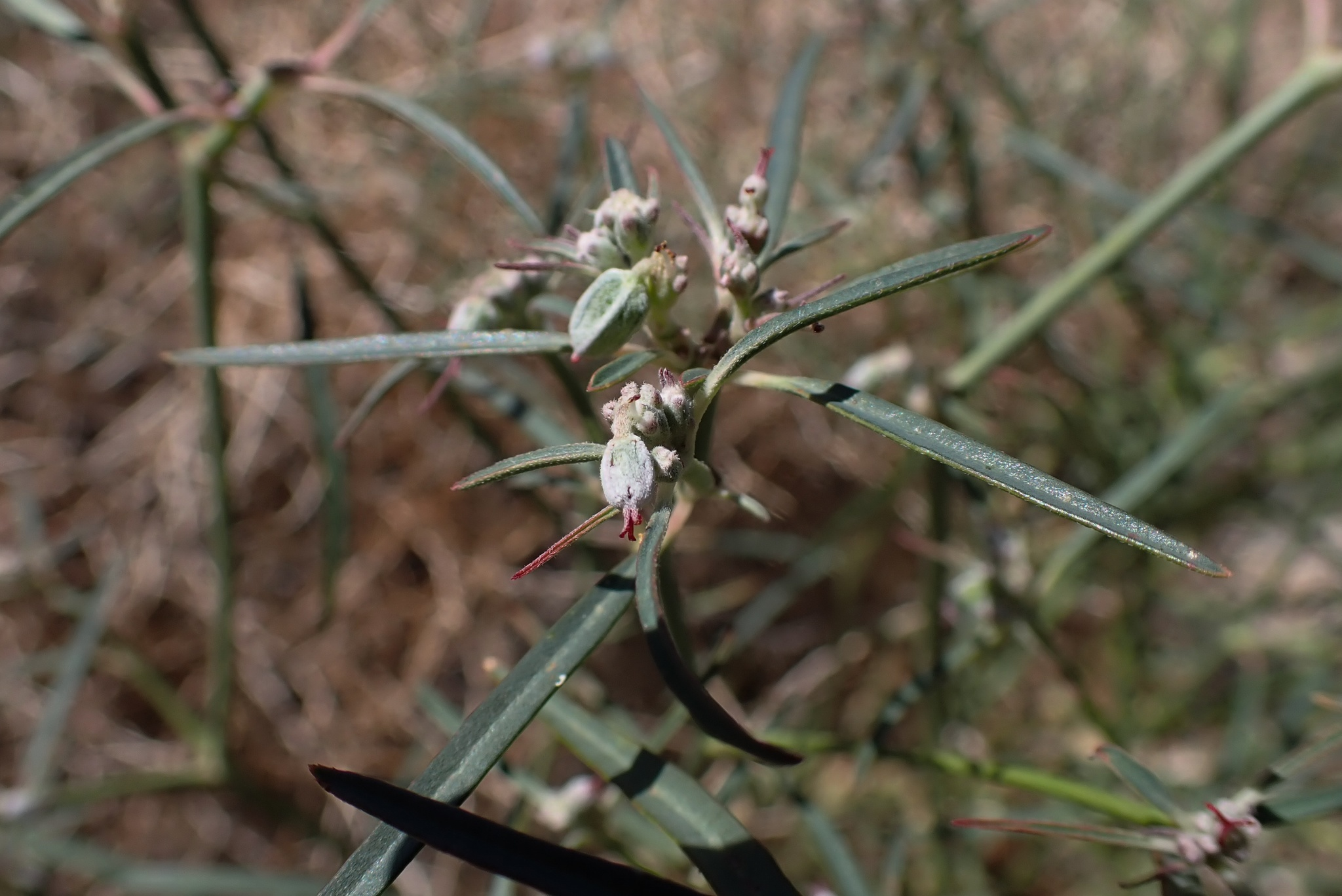

Conservation status
- Secure (NatureServe)

Scientific classification
- Kingdom: Plantae
- Clade: Tracheophytes
- Clade: Angiosperms
- Clade: Eudicots
- Clade: Rosids
- Order: Malpighiales
- Family: Euphorbiaceae
- Genus: Euphorbia
- Species: E. eriantha

Binomial name
- Euphorbia eriantha Benth.

= Euphorbia eriantha =

Species of flowering plant

Euphorbia eriantha is a species of spurge known by the common name beetle spurge. It is also called the Desert Poinsettia and Mexican Poinsettia. It is native to the deserts of northern Mexico and the southwestern United States from California to Texas. Its flowering season is from February to October in Arizona; March to April in California; January to December in Texas. This is an annual herb reaching anywhere from 15 to 50 centimeters in height. The leaves are long, narrow, and pointed, sometimes with sparse hairs, and 2 to 7 centimeters long. The foliage may be dark in color, from greenish to purplish or reddish. The inflorescence appears at the tip of the branch and contains staminate or pistillate flowers which are just a few millimeters wide. The fruit is an oblong, hairy capsule half a centimeter long, with gray and black mottling. It contains bumpy white or gray seeds.
