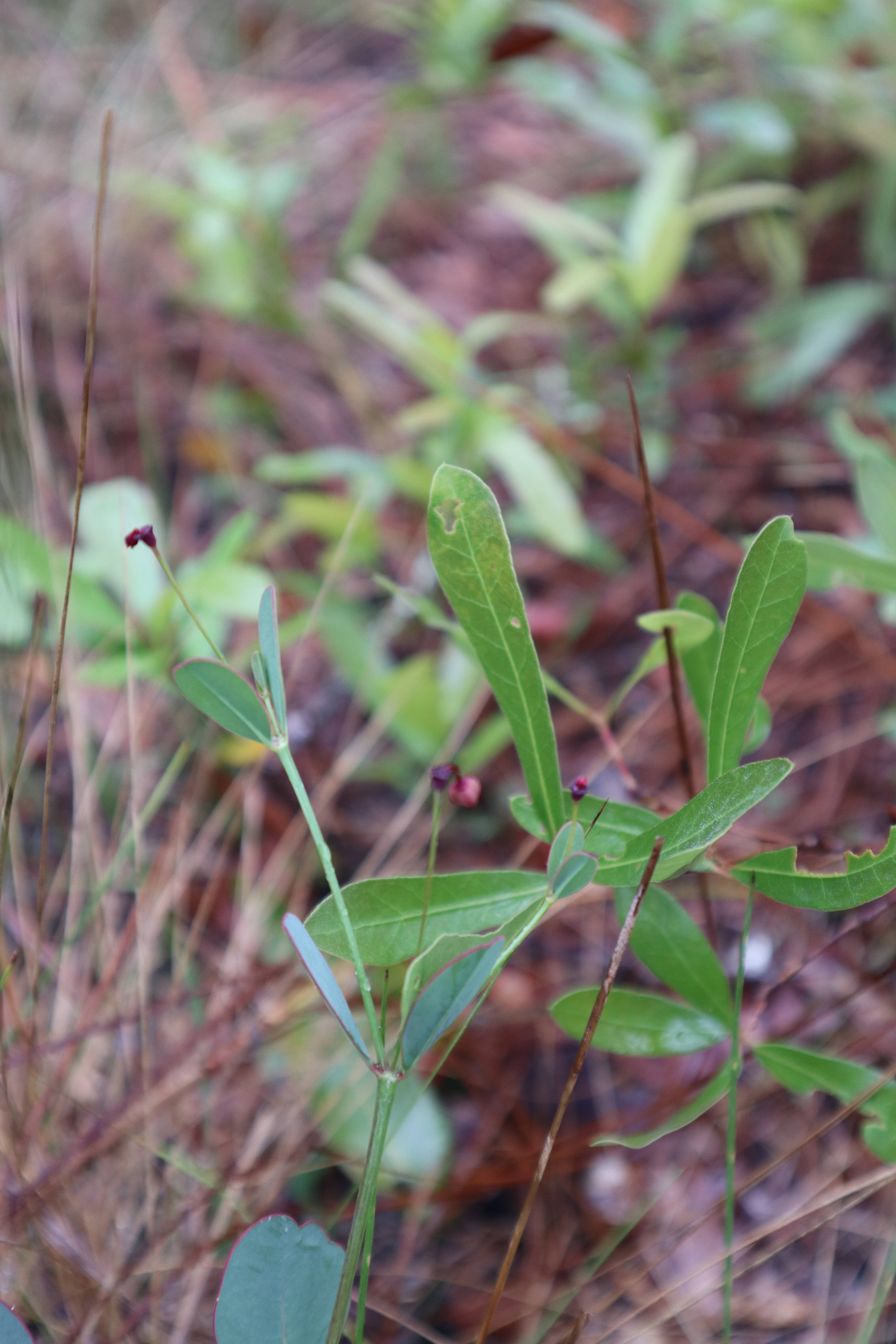

Scientific classification
- Kingdom: Plantae
- Clade: Tracheophytes
- Clade: Angiosperms
- Clade: Eudicots
- Clade: Rosids
- Order: Malpighiales
- Family: Euphorbiaceae
- Genus: Euphorbia
- Species: E. exserta

Binomial name
- Euphorbia exserta (Small) Coker (1912)

Synonyms
- Agaloma elliottii House (1921); Agaloma exserta (Small) Nieuwl. (1912); Agaloma gracilis Nieuwl. (1912); Euphorbia gracilior Cronquist (1949); Euphorbia gracilis Elliott (1824); Euphorbia gracilis var. rotundifolia A.Wood (1881); Euphorbia ipecacuanhae var. gracilis Boiss. (1862); Tithymalopsis gracilis Small (1903); Tithymalus elliottii Klotzsch & Garcke (1860); Tithymalopsis exserta Small (1903); Xamesike gracilis Raf. (1840)

= Euphorbia exserta =

Coastal sand spurge

Species of plant

Euphorbia exserta, known by the common name of coastal sand spurge, is a member of the spurge family, Euphorbiaceae. It is a perennial herb, native to the southeastern United States, from central Florida to North Carolina.
