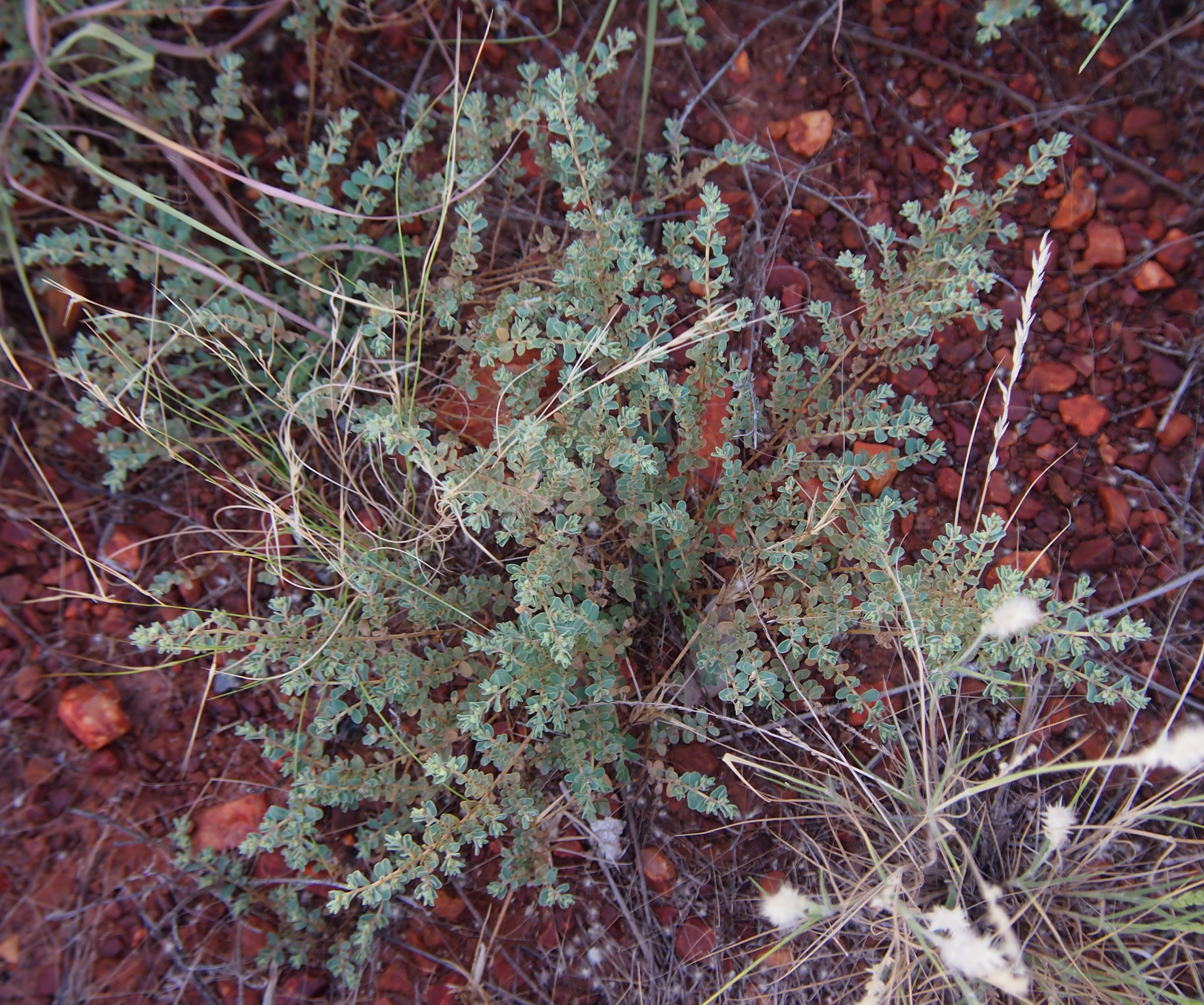

Scientific classification
- Kingdom: Plantae
- Clade: Embryophytes
- Clade: Tracheophytes
- Clade: Spermatophytes
- Clade: Angiosperms
- Clade: Eudicots
- Clade: Rosids
- Order: Malpighiales
- Family: Euphorbiaceae
- Genus: Euphorbia
- Species: E. australis

Binomial name
- Euphorbia australis Boiss.

Synonyms
- Chamaesyce australis (Boiss.) D.C.Hassall; Euphorbia australis var. typica Domin

= Euphorbia australis =

Species of flowering plant

Euphorbia australis, the hairy caustic weed, is a prostrate annual or short-lived perennial plant, found in many areas of Australia.
