= Euphorbia abdulghafooriana =

Scientific classification
- Kingdom: Plantae
- Clade: Tracheophytes
- Clade: Angiosperms
- Clade: Eudicots
- Clade: Rosids
- Order: Malpighiales
- Family: Euphorbiaceae
- Genus: Euphorbia
- Species: E. abdulghafooriana

Binomial name
- Euphorbia abdulghafooriana Abedin

Species of plant

Euphorbia abdulghafooriana is a species of flowering plant in the family Euphorbiaceae, endemic to Saudi Arabia. An annual prostrate herb of deserts and dry shrublands, it resembles the New World species Euphorbia serpens.
