= Euphorbia discoidalis =

Scientific classification
- Kingdom: Plantae
- Clade: Embryophytes
- Clade: Tracheophytes
- Clade: Spermatophytes
- Clade: Angiosperms
- Clade: Eudicots
- Clade: Rosids
- Order: Malpighiales
- Family: Euphorbiaceae
- Genus: Euphorbia
- Species: E. discoidalis

Binomial name
- Euphorbia discoidalis Chapm., 1860

Flowering plant

Euphorbia discoidalis, commonly known as summer spurge, is a flowering plant. A dicot, it grows across parts of the southern United States. It reaches about 18 inches (460 mm) in height and has white flowers in the late summer and early fall. It is part of the Euphorbiaceae (spurge) family and the genus Euphorbia.

== Distribution and habitat ==
Euphorbia discoidalis can be found from eastern and central Georgia south and west to the Florida panhandle and eastern Texas.

It grows mainly on sandhills, including those that are pine-dominated.

E. discoidalis is found in areas that are burned frequently such as longleaf pine-wiregrass savannas.

== Ecology ==
Euphorbia discoidalis is insect pollinated and is recorded to have been visited in northern Florida by Augochloropsis metallica, Lasioglossum apopkense, and Pseudopanurgus aestivalis.
