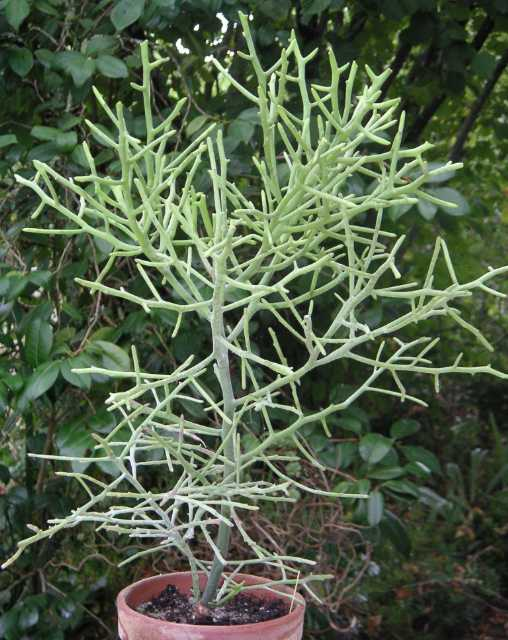

Conservation status
- Least Concern (IUCN 3.1)

Scientific classification
- Kingdom: Plantae
- Clade: Tracheophytes
- Clade: Angiosperms
- Clade: Eudicots
- Clade: Rosids
- Order: Malpighiales
- Family: Euphorbiaceae
- Genus: Euphorbia
- Species: E. arahaka

Binomial name
- Euphorbia arahaka Poiss.

= Euphorbia arahaka =

Species of flowering plant

Euphorbia arahaka is a species of plant in the family Euphorbiaceae. It is endemic to Madagascar. Its natural habitats are subtropical or tropical dry forests, subtropical or tropical dry shrubland, and sandy shores. It is threatened by habitat loss.
