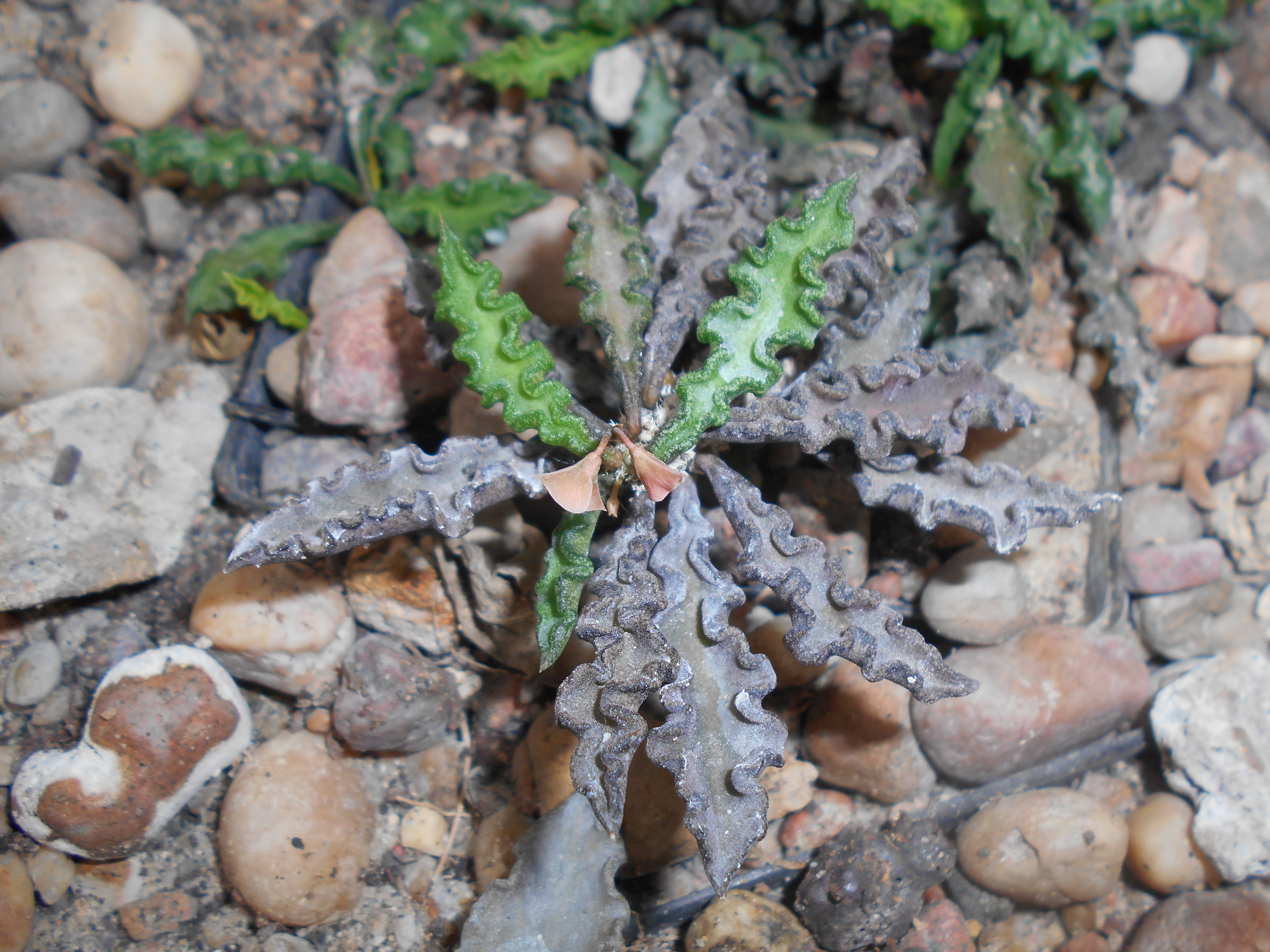

Conservation status
- Vulnerable (IUCN 3.1)

Scientific classification
- Kingdom: Plantae
- Clade: Tracheophytes
- Clade: Angiosperms
- Clade: Eudicots
- Clade: Rosids
- Order: Malpighiales
- Family: Euphorbiaceae
- Genus: Euphorbia
- Species: E. boiteaui

Binomial name
- Euphorbia boiteaui Leandri

= Euphorbia boiteaui =

Species of flowering plant

Euphorbia boiteaui is a species of flowering plant in the family Euphorbiaceae.

It is endemic to Madagascar. Its natural habitat is subtropical or tropical dry forests. It is threatened by habitat loss.
