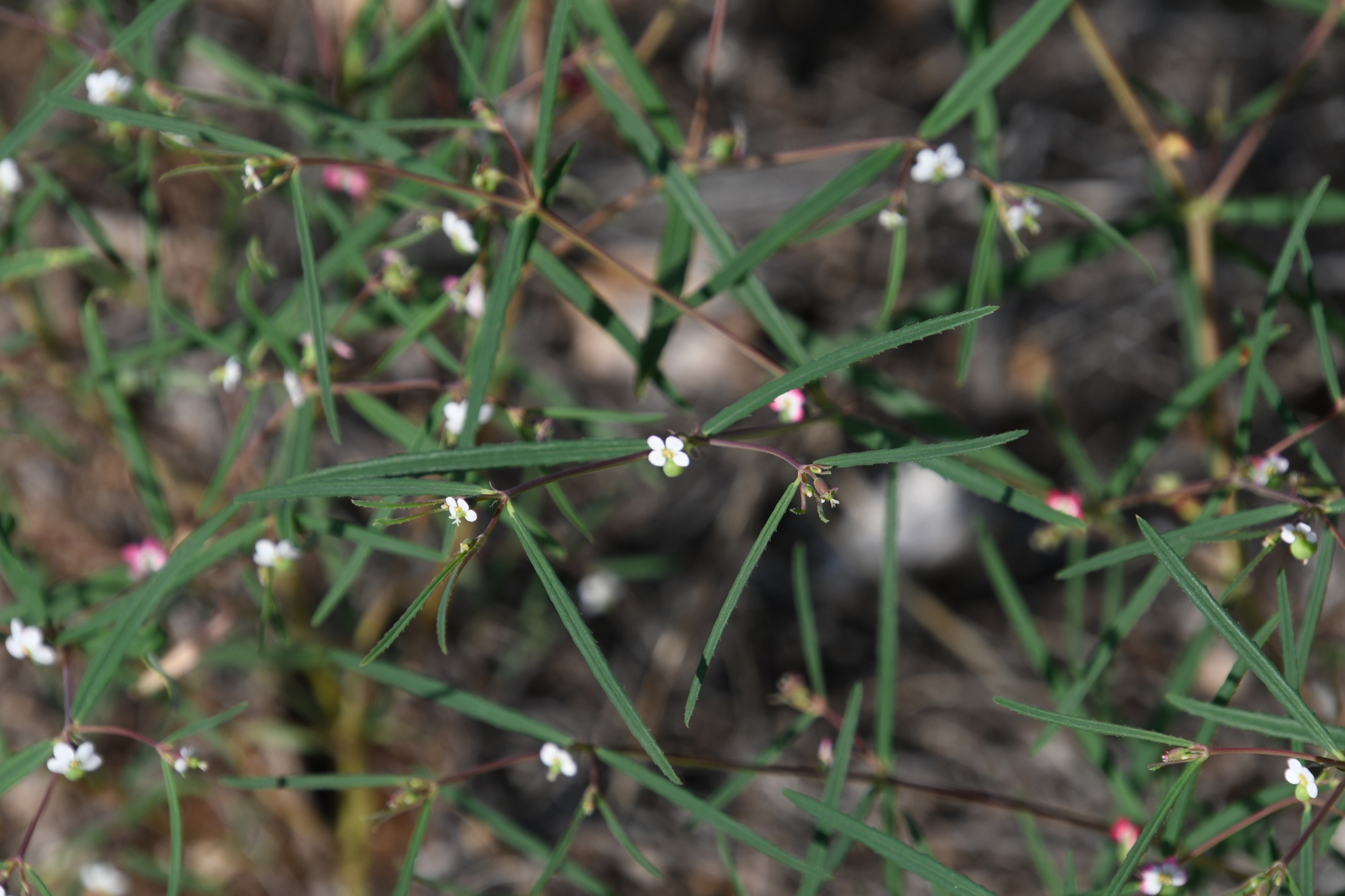

Scientific classification
- Kingdom: Plantae
- Clade: Tracheophytes
- Clade: Angiosperms
- Clade: Eudicots
- Clade: Rosids
- Order: Malpighiales
- Family: Euphorbiaceae
- Genus: Euphorbia
- Species: E. florida

Binomial name
- Euphorbia florida Engelm.

Synonyms
- Chamaesyce florida (Engelm.) Millsp.

= Euphorbia florida =

Species of flowering plant

Euphorbia florida, the Chiricahua milk spurge or Chiricahua Mountain sandmat, is an annual plant in the spurge family (Euphorbiaceae) found in the Sonoran Desert of the mountains of southern Arizona and north-western Mexico.
