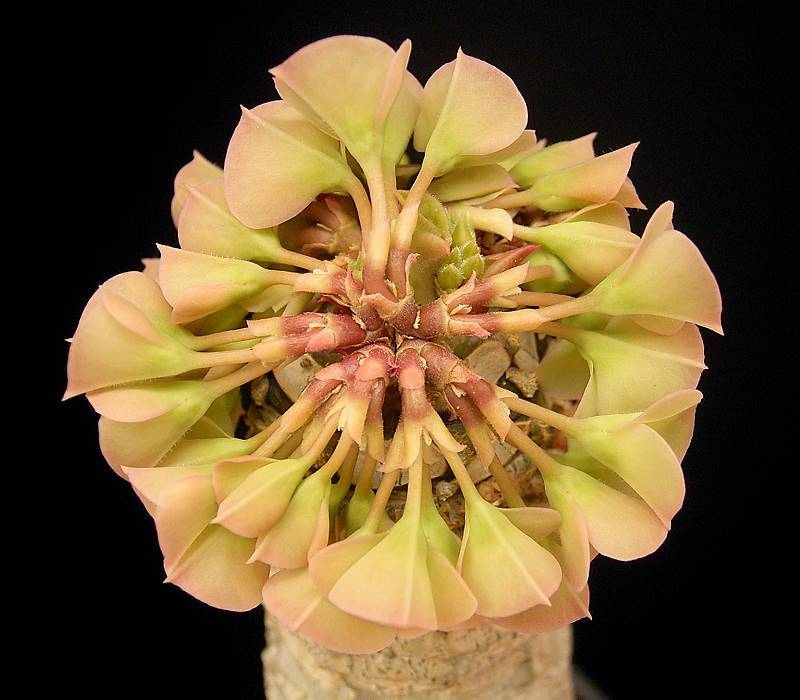

Conservation status
- Vulnerable (IUCN 3.1)

Scientific classification
- Kingdom: Plantae
- Clade: Tracheophytes
- Clade: Angiosperms
- Clade: Eudicots
- Clade: Rosids
- Order: Malpighiales
- Family: Euphorbiaceae
- Genus: Euphorbia
- Species: E. alfredii

Binomial name
- Euphorbia alfredii Rauh

= Euphorbia alfredii =

Species of flowering plant

Euphorbia alfredii is a species of plant in the family Euphorbiaceae. It is endemic to Madagascar. Its natural habitats are subtropical or tropical dry forests, subtropical or tropical dry shrubland, and rocky areas. It is threatened by habitat loss.

As most other succulent members of the genus Euphorbia, its trade is regulated under Appendix II of CITES.
