= Euphorbia dhofarensis =

Scientific classification
- Kingdom: Plantae
- Clade: Tracheophytes
- Clade: Angiosperms
- Clade: Eudicots
- Clade: Rosids
- Order: Malpighiales
- Family: Euphorbiaceae
- Genus: Euphorbia
- Species: E. dhofarensis

Binomial name
- Euphorbia dhofarensis S.Carter

Species of flowering plant

Euphorbia dhofarensis is a species of flowering plant in the family Euphorbiaceae, endemic to Oman, where it is found in the Dhofar region, in stony wadi between 50 and 650 metres in altitude.

As most other succulent members of the genus Euphorbia, its trade is regulated under Appendix II of CITES.
