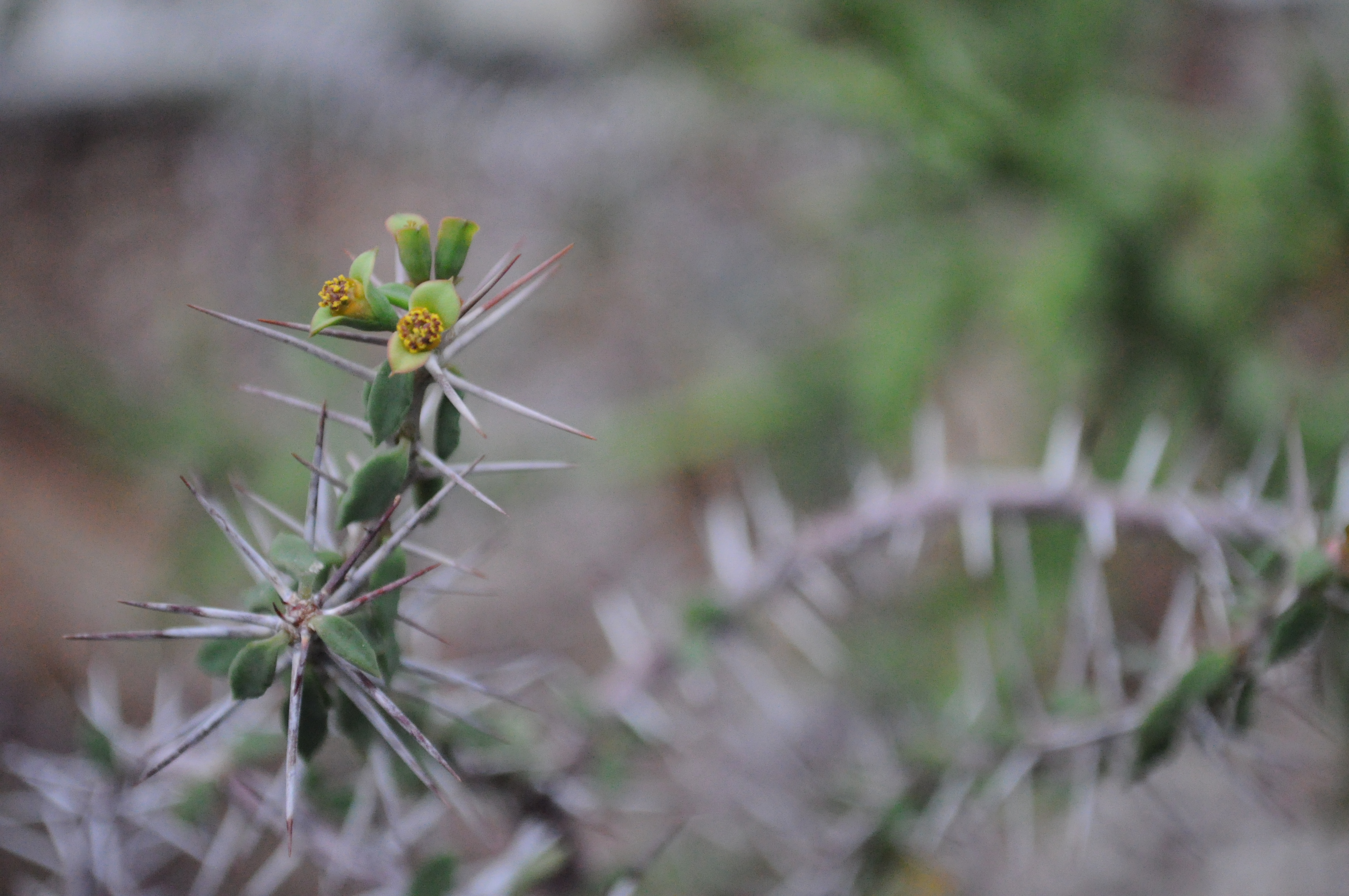

Conservation status
- Vulnerable (IUCN 3.1)

Scientific classification
- Kingdom: Plantae
- Clade: Tracheophytes
- Clade: Angiosperms
- Clade: Eudicots
- Clade: Rosids
- Order: Malpighiales
- Family: Euphorbiaceae
- Genus: Euphorbia
- Species: E. beharensis

Binomial name
- Euphorbia beharensis Leandri

Synonyms
- Euphorbia beharensis var. adpressifolia Rauh; Euphorbia beharensis var. guillemetii (Ursch & Leandri) Rauh; Euphorbia beharensis var. truncata Rauh; Euphorbia guillemetii Ursch & Leandri

= Euphorbia beharensis =

Species of flowering plant

Euphorbia beharensis is a species of plant in the family Euphorbiaceae. It is endemic to Madagascar. Its natural habitats are subtropical or tropical dry forests and subtropical or tropical dry shrubland. It is threatened by habitat loss.
