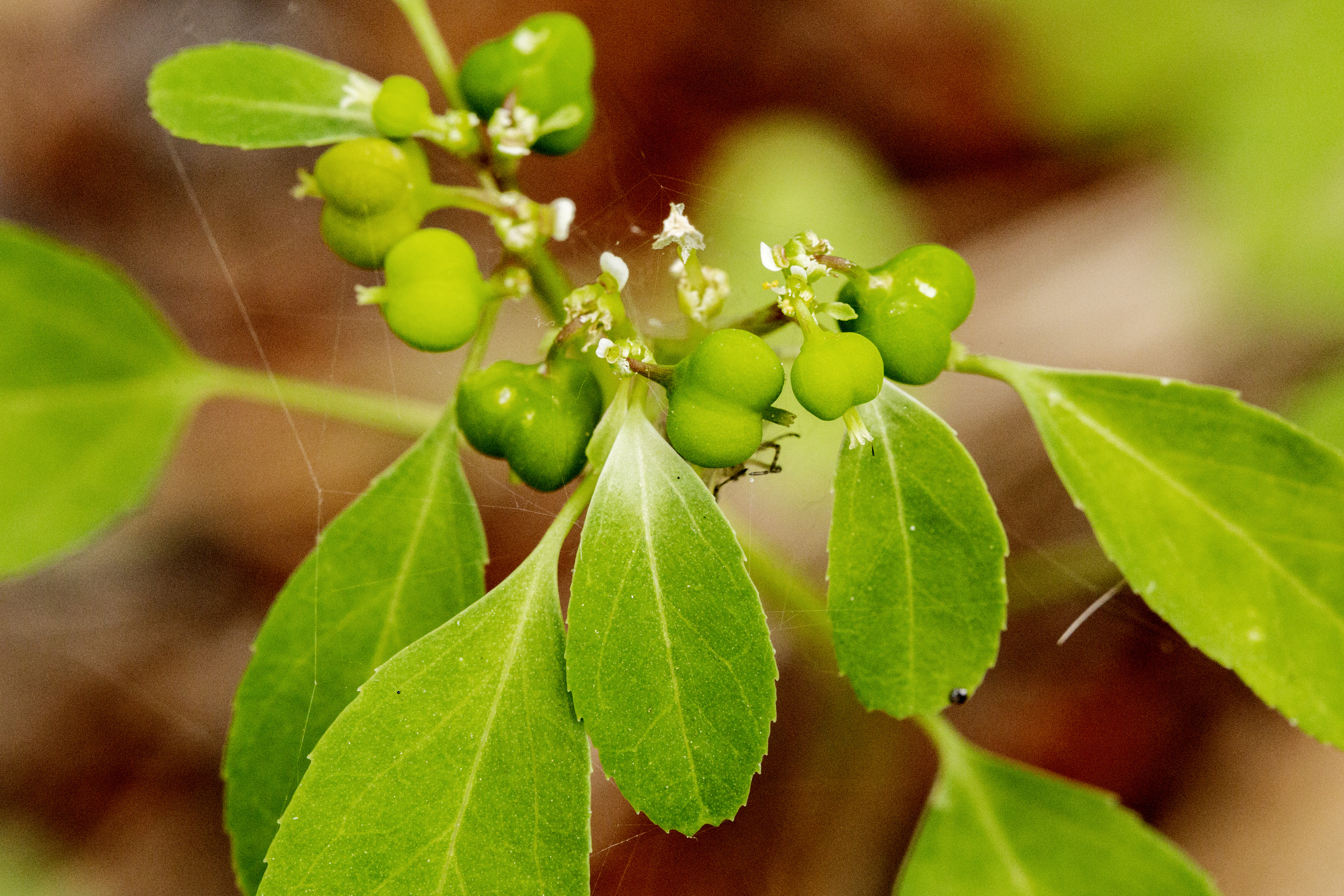

Scientific classification
- Kingdom: Plantae
- Clade: Tracheophytes
- Clade: Angiosperms
- Clade: Eudicots
- Clade: Rosids
- Order: Malpighiales
- Family: Euphorbiaceae
- Genus: Euphorbia
- Species: E. bifurcata

Binomial name
- Euphorbia bifurcata Engelmann

= Euphorbia bifurcata =

Species of plant found in Texas and New Mexico

Euphorbia bifurcata, commonly known as the forked spurge, is a species of plant in the family Euphorbiaceae native to Texas and New Mexico.
