= Euphorbia emirnensis =

Conservation status
- Least Concern (IUCN 3.1)

Scientific classification
- Kingdom: Plantae
- Clade: Tracheophytes
- Clade: Angiosperms
- Clade: Eudicots
- Clade: Rosids
- Order: Malpighiales
- Family: Euphorbiaceae
- Genus: Euphorbia
- Species: E. emirnensis

Binomial name
- Euphorbia emirnensis Baker

Species of flowering plant

Euphorbia emirnensis is a species of plant in the family Euphorbiaceae. It is found in Comoros, Madagascar, and Mayotte. Its natural habitat is subtropical or tropical high-elevation grassland. It is threatened by habitat loss.
