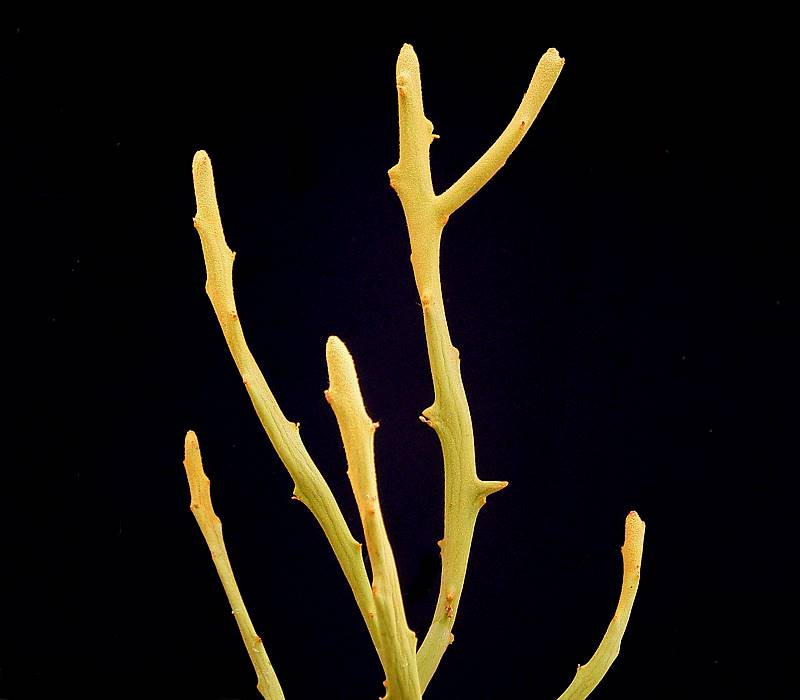

Conservation status
- Endangered (IUCN 3.1)

Scientific classification
- Kingdom: Plantae
- Clade: Tracheophytes
- Clade: Angiosperms
- Clade: Eudicots
- Clade: Rosids
- Order: Malpighiales
- Family: Euphorbiaceae
- Genus: Euphorbia
- Species: E. alcicornis

Binomial name
- Euphorbia alcicornis Baker

Synonyms
- Euphorbia imerina Cremers

= Euphorbia alcicornis =

Plant species in the spurge family

Euphorbia alcicornis is a species of plant in the spurge family. It is endemic to Madagascar. Its natural habitat is rocky areas. It is threatened by habitat loss.

As most other succulent members of the genus Euphorbia, its trade is regulated under Appendix II of CITES.

== Taxonomy ==
Euphorbia alcicornis was scientifically described and named by John Gilbert Baker in 1887. It is classified as a species in the Euphorbia within the wider Euphorbiaceae family. It has no subspecies and one heterotypic synonym, Euphorbia imerina which was published by Georges Cremers in 1984.
