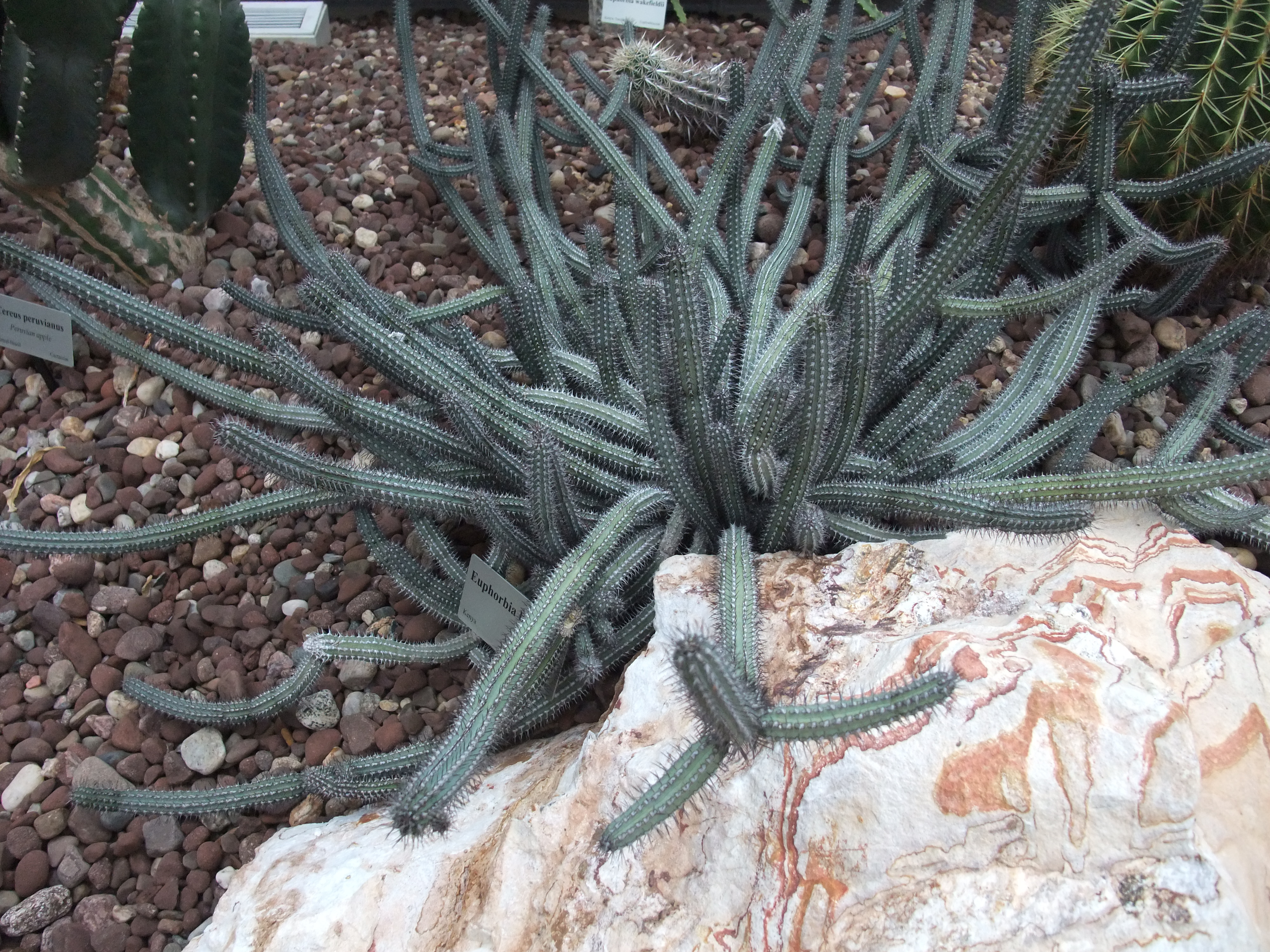

Scientific classification
- Kingdom: Plantae
- Clade: Tracheophytes
- Clade: Angiosperms
- Clade: Eudicots
- Clade: Rosids
- Order: Malpighiales
- Family: Euphorbiaceae
- Genus: Euphorbia
- Species: E. baioensis

Binomial name
- Euphorbia baioensis S.Carter

= Euphorbia baioensis =

Species of flowering plant

Euphorbia baioensis is a species of flowering plant in the family Euphorbiaceae.

This spiny succulent plant is originally from Kenya. It is found in tropical deserts and flourishes in hot dry conditions.
