= Euphorbia berorohae =

Conservation status
- Critically Endangered (IUCN 3.1)

Scientific classification
- Kingdom: Plantae
- Clade: Tracheophytes
- Clade: Angiosperms
- Clade: Eudicots
- Clade: Rosids
- Order: Malpighiales
- Family: Euphorbiaceae
- Genus: Euphorbia
- Species: E. berorohae

Binomial name
- Euphorbia berorohae Rauh & Hofstätter

Species of flowering plant

Euphorbia berorohae is a species of plant in the family Euphorbiaceae. It is endemic to Madagascar. Its natural habitat is rocky shores. It is threatened by habitat loss.
