= Euphorbia araucana =

Scientific classification
- Kingdom: Plantae
- Clade: Tracheophytes
- Clade: Angiosperms
- Clade: Eudicots
- Clade: Rosids
- Order: Malpighiales
- Family: Euphorbiaceae
- Genus: Euphorbia
- Species: E. araucana

Binomial name
- Euphorbia araucana Phil.

Species of plant

Euphorbia araucana is a species of flowering plant in the family Euphorbiaceae. It is one of the 14 species in the genus Euphorbia that are endemic to Chile. It inhabits the Araucania region.
