= Euphorbia aureoviridiflora =

Conservation status
- Vulnerable (IUCN 3.1)

Scientific classification
- Kingdom: Plantae
- Clade: Tracheophytes
- Clade: Angiosperms
- Clade: Eudicots
- Clade: Rosids
- Order: Malpighiales
- Family: Euphorbiaceae
- Genus: Euphorbia
- Species: E. aureoviridiflora

Binomial name
- Euphorbia aureoviridiflora (Rauh) Rauh

Species of flowering plant

Euphorbia aureoviridiflora is a species of plant in the family Euphorbiaceae. It is endemic to Madagascar. Its natural habitat is rocky areas. It is threatened by habitat loss. It is protected from export under CITES.
