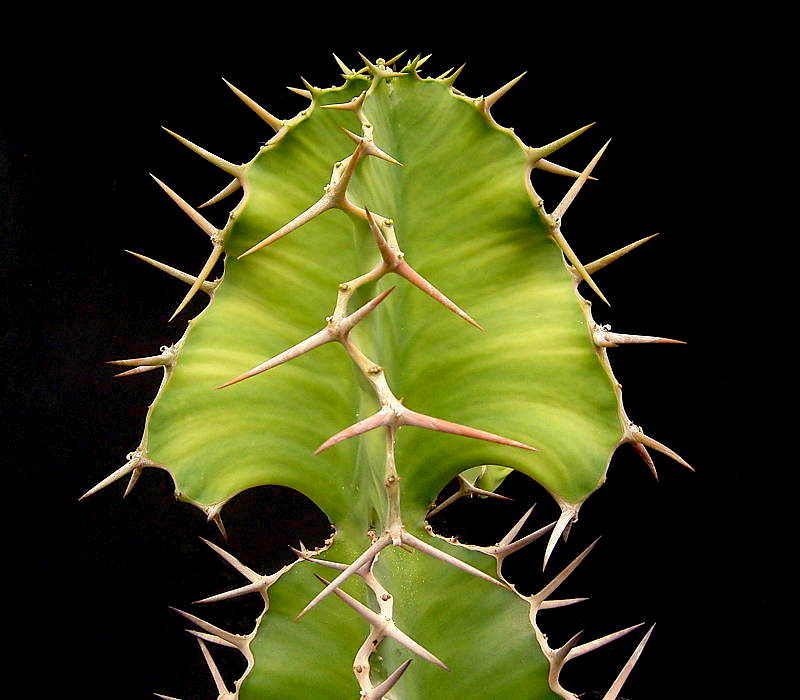

Scientific classification
- Kingdom: Plantae
- Clade: Tracheophytes
- Clade: Angiosperms
- Clade: Eudicots
- Clade: Rosids
- Order: Malpighiales
- Family: Euphorbiaceae
- Genus: Euphorbia
- Species: E. breviarticulata

Binomial name
- Euphorbia breviarticulata Pax

= Euphorbia breviarticulata =

Species of plant

Euphorbia breviarticulata is a species of flowering plant in the family Euphorbiaceae. Euphorbia breviarticulata was described by Ferdinand Albin Pax and published in Botanische Jahrbücher für Systematik, Pflanzengeschichte und Pflanzengeographie 34: 84. 1904.

== Description ==
It is a perennial plant with a succulent quadrangular stem and double thorns on its edges. Bushy in shape, it reaches a size of 4.5 m in height, branched from the base, or occasionally a tree of up to 6 m, the branches are fleshy, erect and extended, the lowest are prostrate.

== Habitat ==
It is found in open or dense thickets of Acacia Commiphora, often forming thickets, on sandy soils, silt and remnants of coastal dunes, rocky outcrops, mixed with species of Lannea, Grewia and Sansevieria; at an altitude of 60–1200 meters.

It has a close relationship with Euphorbia grandicornis; and can be confused with the young Euphorbia bussei .

== Distribution ==
It is native to Ethiopia, Kenya, Somalia, and Tanzania.

== Taxonomy ==
Euphorbia is a generic name that derives from the Greek physician of King Juba II of Mauritania (52 to 50 BC - 23 ), Euphorbus, in his honor - or in allusion to his large belly - since he used Euphorbia resinifera medically. In 1753 Carlos Linnaeus assigned the name to the entire genus.

Breviarticulata is a Latin epithet that means "briefly articulated".
