= List of Euphorbia species =

Euphorbia is a highly diverse plant genus, comprising 2,105 currently accepted taxa.

This is an alphabetical list of the Euphorbia species and notable infraspecific taxa.

The list includes the former (and never generally accepted) genus Chamaesyce, as well as the related genera Elaeophorbia, Endadenium, Monadenium, Synadenium and Pedilanthus which according to recent DNA sequence-based phylogenetic studies are all nested within Euphorbia

Noticeably succulent plants are marked by (s).
