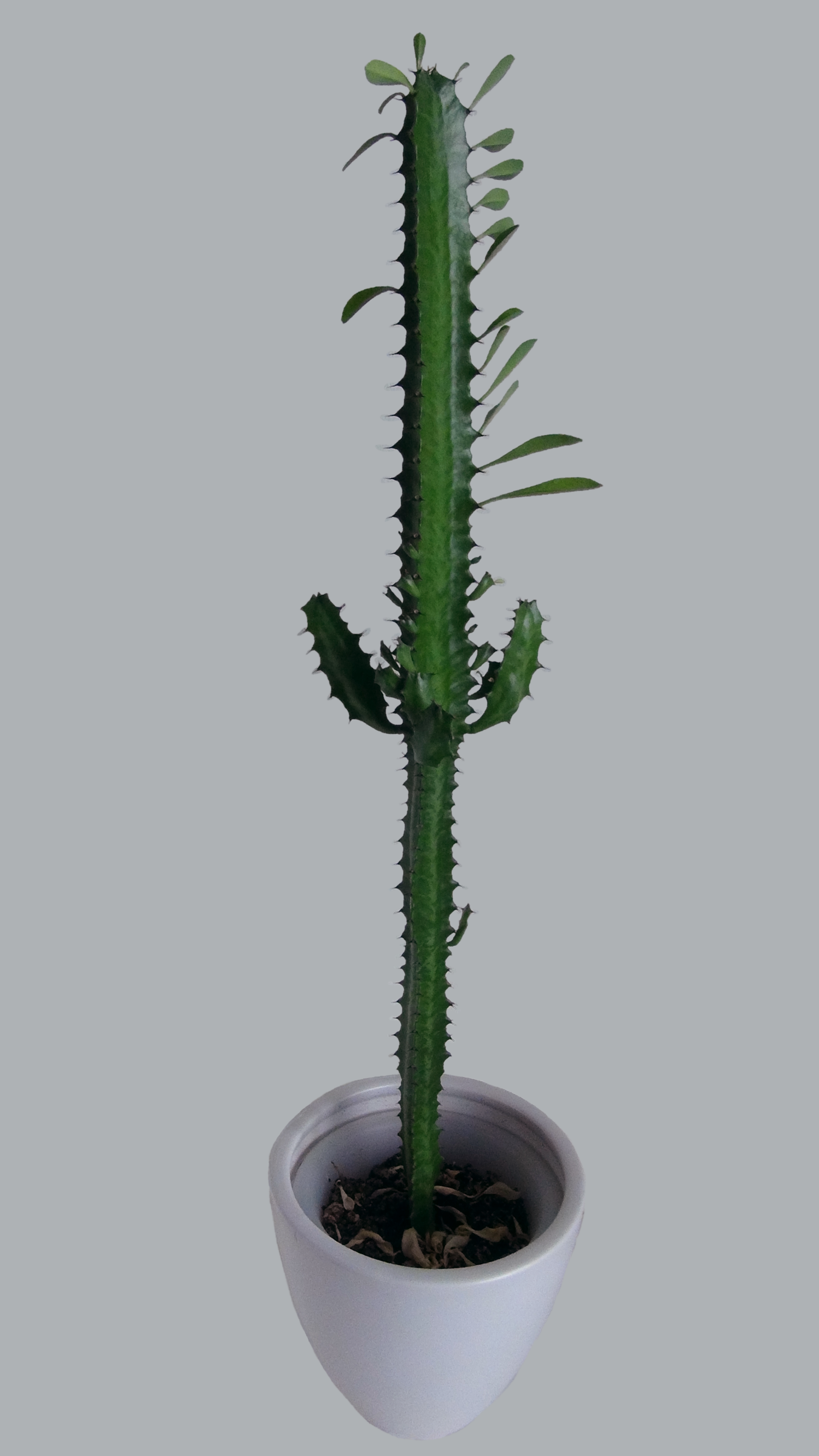

Conservation status
- Data Deficient (IUCN 3.1)

Scientific classification
- Kingdom: Plantae
- Clade: Tracheophytes
- Clade: Angiosperms
- Clade: Eudicots
- Clade: Rosids
- Order: Malpighiales
- Family: Euphorbiaceae
- Genus: Euphorbia
- Species: E. trigona

Binomial name
- Euphorbia trigona Mill.

= Euphorbia trigona =

Species of flowering plant

Euphorbia trigona, the African milk tree, cathedral cactus, or Abyssinian euphorbia, is a species of flowering plant that originates from Central Africa. Somewhat common in cultivation as a houseplant or as a hedge, the species is one of the euphorbias with succulent stems and branches as an adaptation to arid climates.

== Description ==
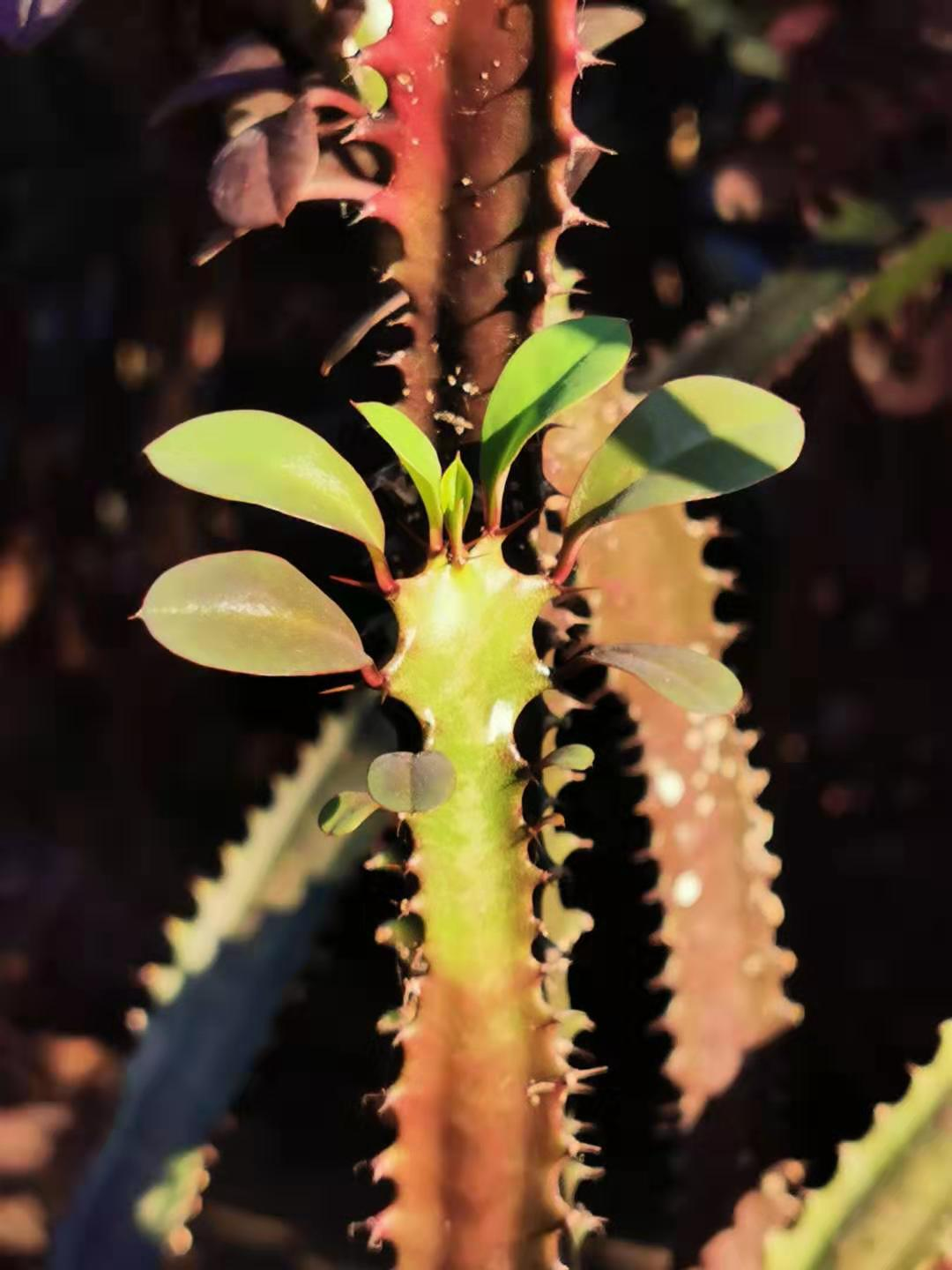
Royal Red cultivar

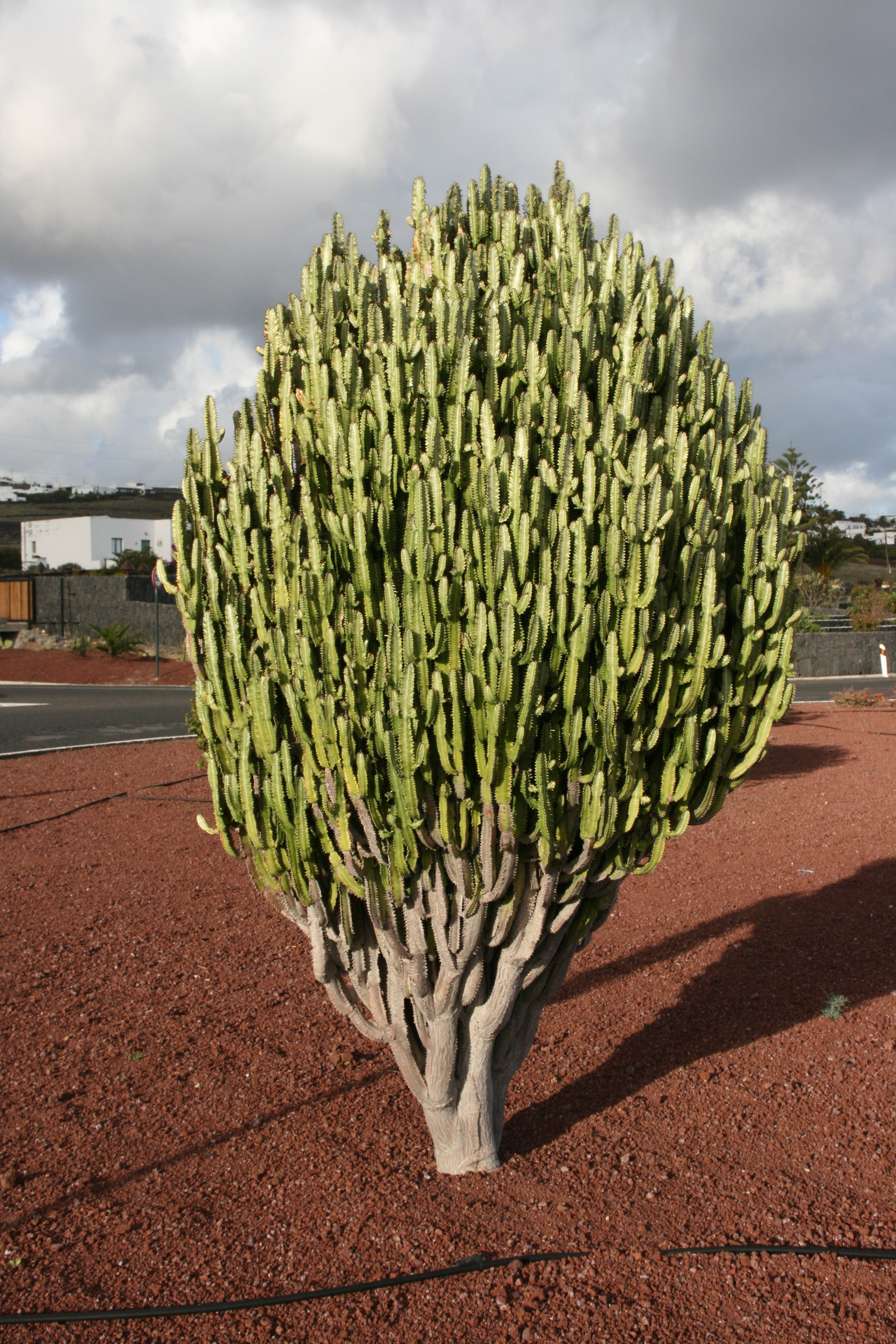
E. trigona grown outdoors in full sun can form a tall shrub or small tree form

This succulent shrub has an upright stem and many branches that also grow upward. The stem and branches can have two or three sides. The stem itself is dark green with V-shaped light green patterns. The 5 mm (1/4 in) thorns occur in pairs on the stem's ridges. The drop shaped leaves grow from between the two thorns on each ridge. The plant has never been known to flower, and is possibly a hybrid.

== Cultivation ==
Euphorbia trigona can withstand brief cold temperatures of down to −3 °C (27 °F). It prefers sandy soil but can cope with most types of well-drained soil. It can root easily from stem cuttings, if allowed to dry for 3–7 days before planting so that it can form a callus and not rot. It grows to a height of 1.5–3 m (4 ft 11 in – 9 ft 10 in).

== Chemistry ==
As with many other Euphorbia species, the latex from the plant is poisonous and can cause skin irritation. It is a pest-free plant. A problem that some face is that they are susceptible to falling over when fully grown because of their shallow and small root system.

== Uses ==
The plant is known only in human cultivation and is commonly used as a house plant. It is used as a ritual plant and a hedge in Gabon.
