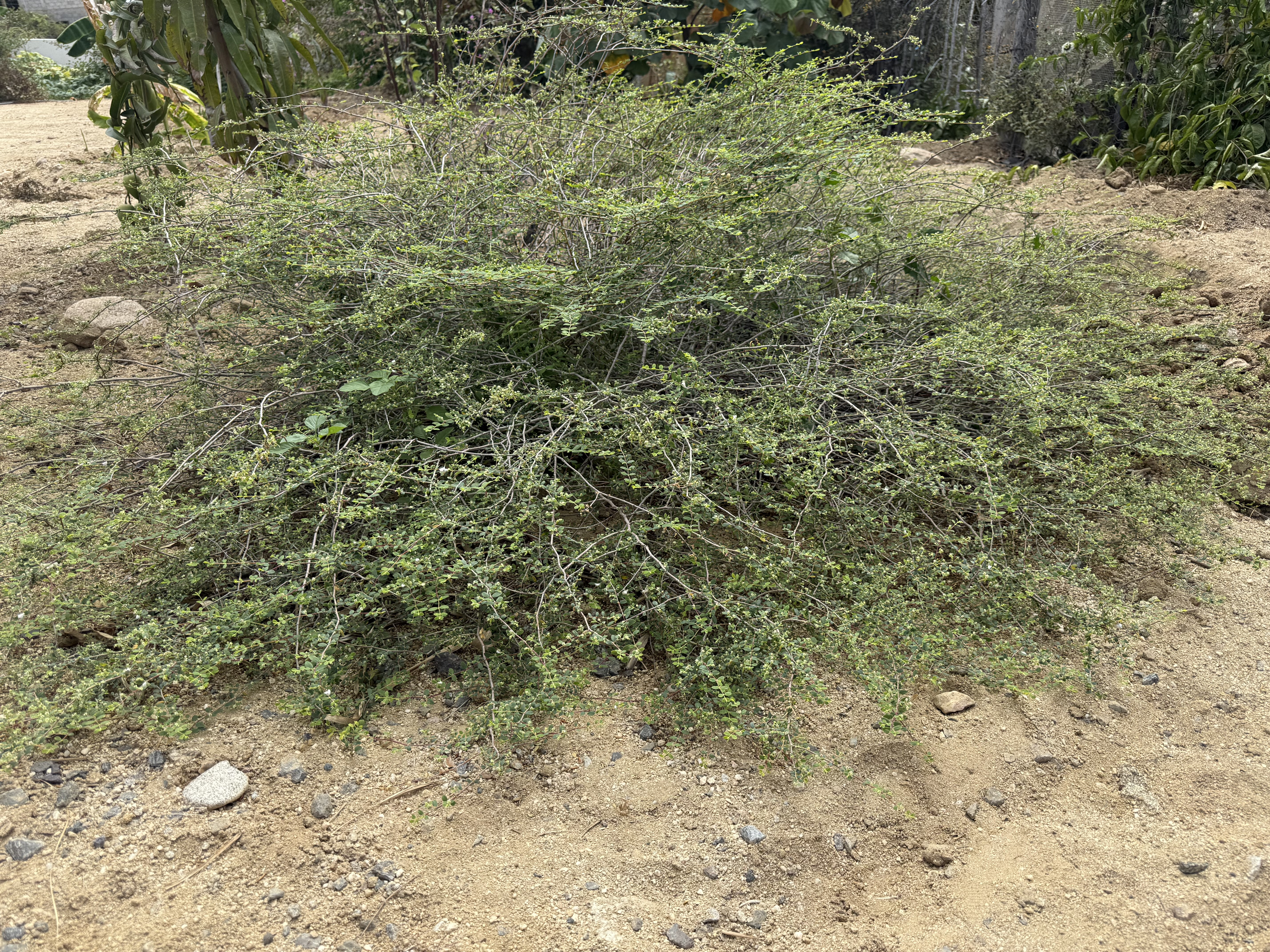

Scientific classification
- Kingdom: Plantae
- Clade: Tracheophytes
- Clade: Angiosperms
- Clade: Eudicots
- Clade: Rosids
- Order: Malpighiales
- Family: Euphorbiaceae
- Genus: Euphorbia
- Species: E. magdalenae

Binomial name
- Euphorbia magdalenae Benth.

Synonyms
- List: Chamaesyce magdalenae (Benth.) Millsp.; Chamaesyce watsonii (Millsp.) Millsp.; Euphorbia blepharostipula Millsp. ex N.E.Rose; Euphorbia espirituensis M.E.Jones; Euphorbia watsonii Millsp.

= Euphorbia magdalenae =

Species of flowering plant

Euphorbia magdalenae is a semi-succulent shrub in the genus Euphorbia, commonly known as Magdalena Island spurge or golondrinón.

It is a local endemic often found on hillsides, arroyo beds and bajadas within the Mexican state of Baja California Sur, particularly from Vizcaíno to the Cape Region. The species is characterized by its distinctive leaf arrangement and is usually found in desert or dry shrubland environments.

It was first described in 1844 by English botanist, George Bentham.

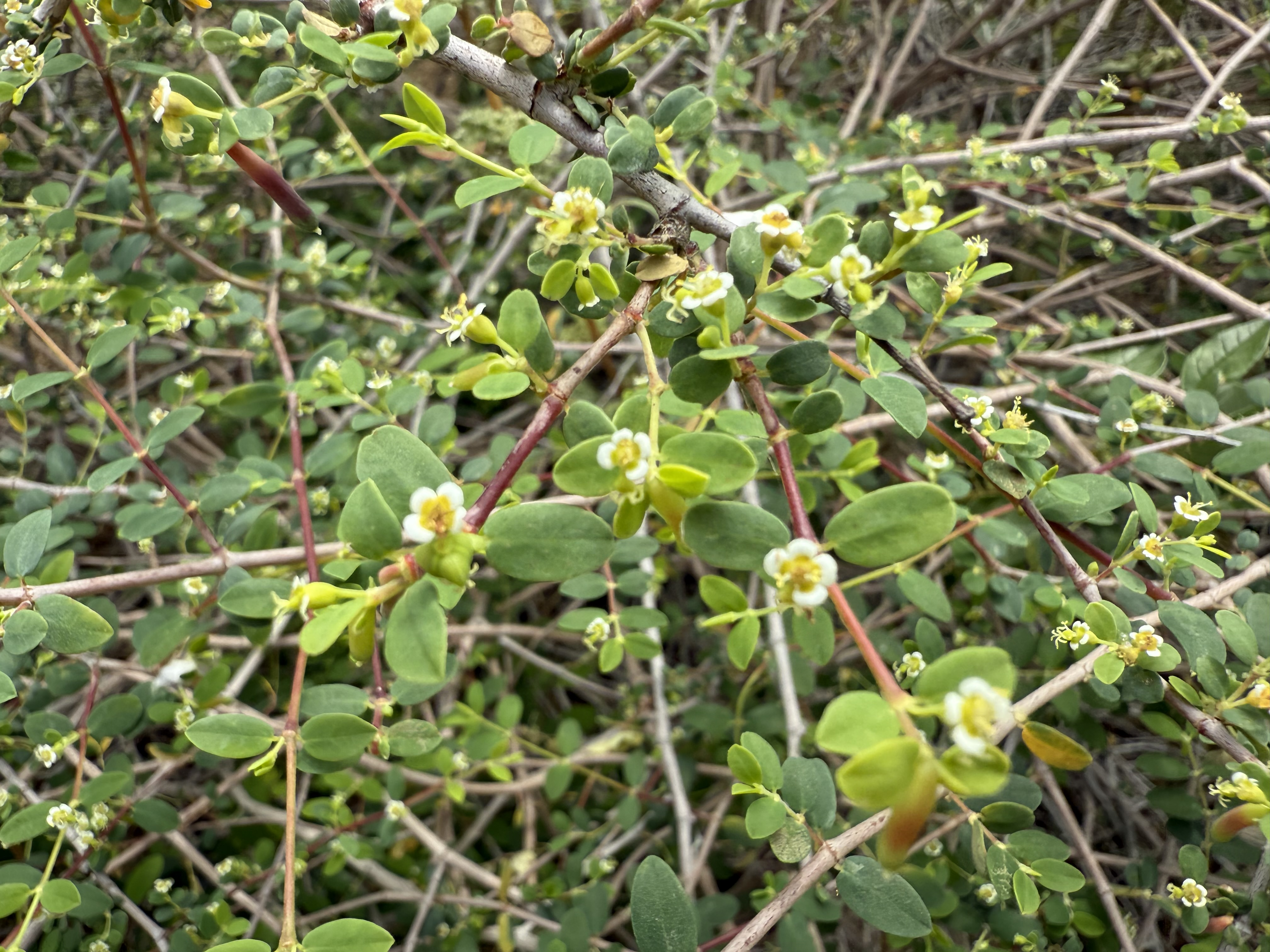
Flower detail
