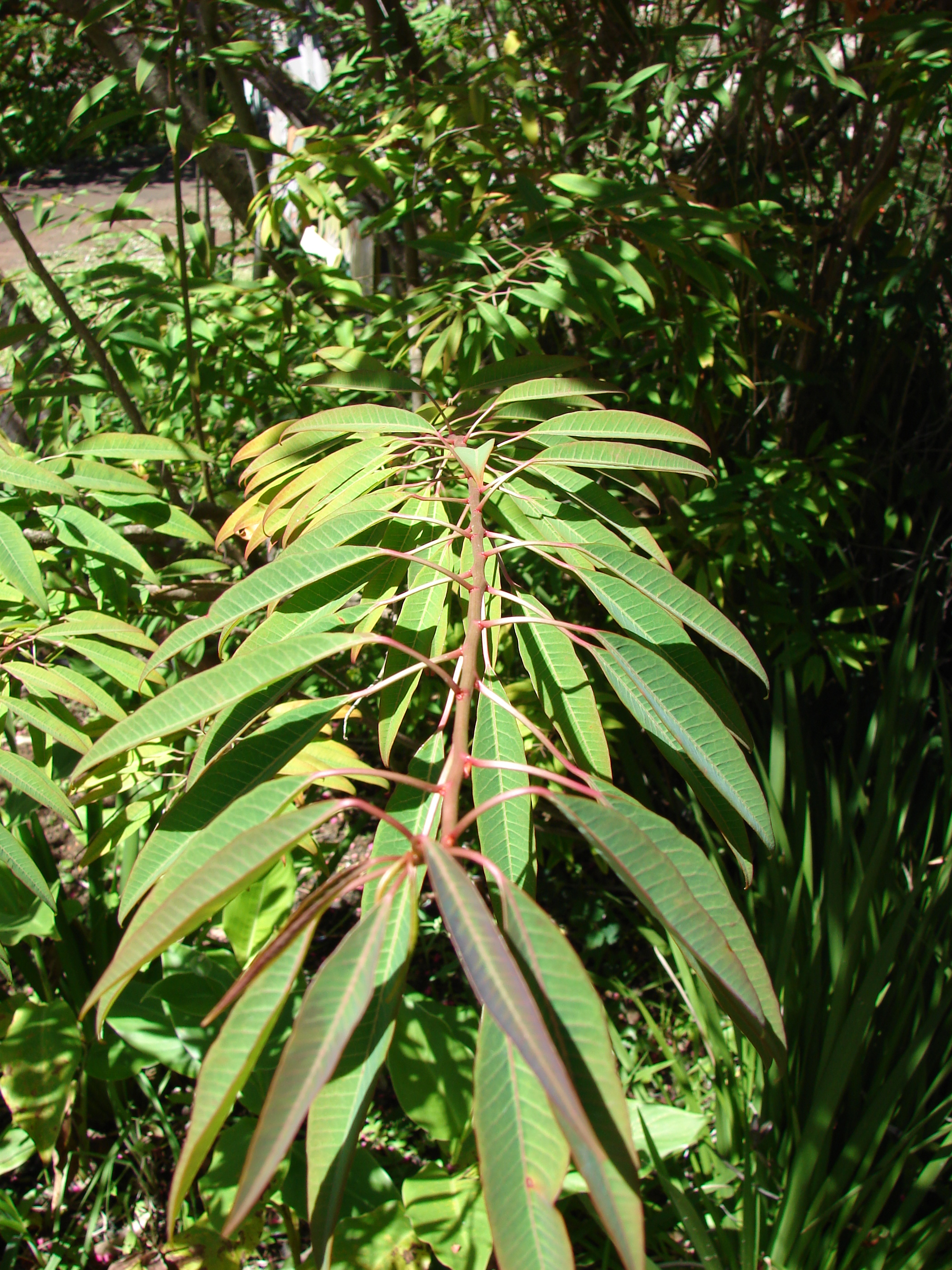

Scientific classification
- Kingdom: Plantae
- Clade: Tracheophytes
- Clade: Angiosperms
- Clade: Eudicots
- Clade: Rosids
- Order: Malpighiales
- Family: Euphorbiaceae
- Genus: Euphorbia
- Species: E. fulgens

Binomial name
- Euphorbia fulgens Karw. ex Klotzsch

= Euphorbia fulgens =

Species of flowering plant

Euphorbia fulgens, the scarlet plume, is a species of flowering plant in the spurge family Euphorbiaceae, native to Mexico. Growing to 1.5 m (4.9 ft) tall by 1 m (3.3 ft) broad, it is a deciduous shrub with long, weeping branches and narrow leaves. In winter orange-red flowers growing in the leaf axils cover the length of the branches.

The Latin specific epithet fulgens means "shining, glistening".

It is not hardy, requiring temperatures above 10 °C (50 °F). It must therefore be grown under glass in temperate regions. It has gained the Royal Horticultural Society's Award of Garden Merit.
