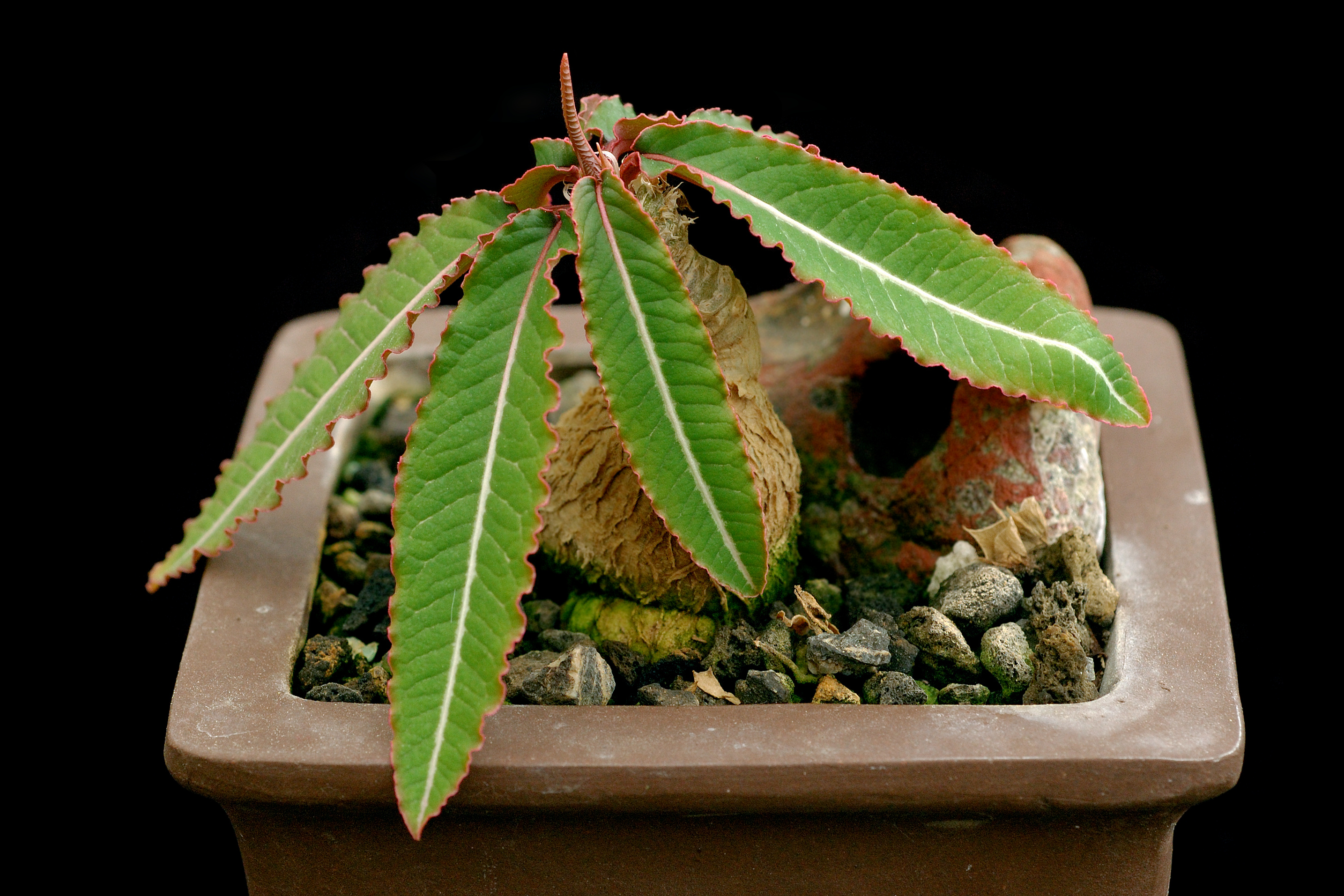

Conservation status
- Critically Endangered (IUCN 3.1)

Scientific classification
- Kingdom: Plantae
- Clade: Tracheophytes
- Clade: Angiosperms
- Clade: Eudicots
- Clade: Rosids
- Order: Malpighiales
- Family: Euphorbiaceae
- Genus: Euphorbia
- Species: E. labatii

Binomial name
- Euphorbia labatii Rauh & Bard.-Vauc.

= Euphorbia labatii =

Species of flowering plant

Euphorbia labatii is a rare endemic known only from a single locality in Antsiranana Province, Madagascar.
