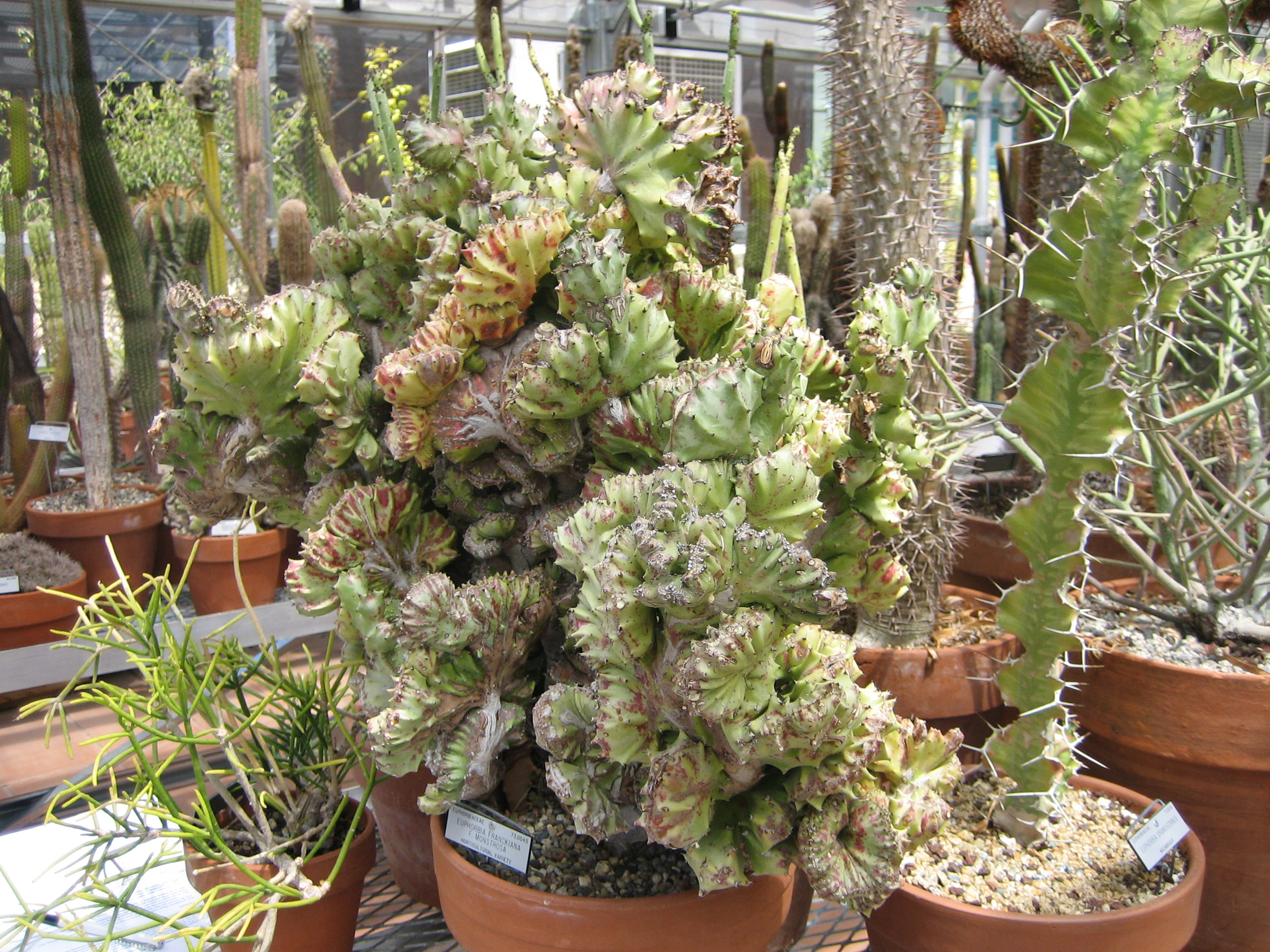
- Euphorbia franckiana at the Berkeley Botanical Gardens

Scientific classification
- Kingdom: Plantae
- Clade: Embryophytes
- Clade: Tracheophytes
- Clade: Spermatophytes
- Clade: Angiosperms
- Clade: Eudicots
- Clade: Rosids
- Order: Malpighiales
- Family: Euphorbiaceae
- Genus: Euphorbia
- Species: E. franckiana

Binomial name
- Euphorbia franckiana A.Berger

= Euphorbia franckiana =

Species of flowering plant

Euphorbia franckiana is a species of flowering plant in the Euphorbiaceae family. It is a spurge native to southern Africa. Phorbol has been isolated from the latex of this perennial plant.
