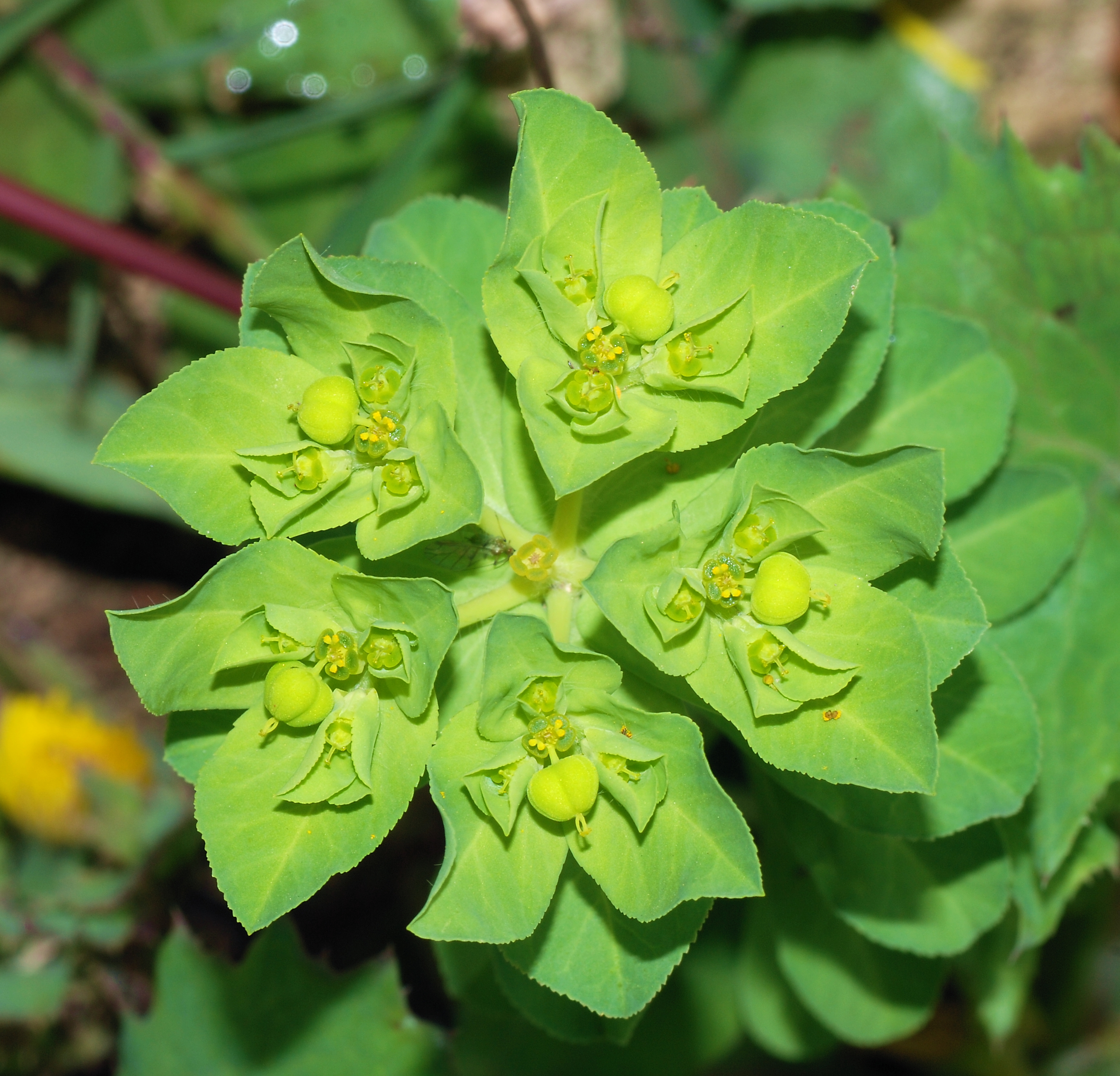

Scientific classification
- Kingdom: Plantae
- Clade: Tracheophytes
- Clade: Angiosperms
- Clade: Eudicots
- Clade: Rosids
- Order: Malpighiales
- Family: Euphorbiaceae
- Tribe: Euphorbieae
- Subtribe: Euphorbiinae
- Genus: Euphorbia
- Species: E. serrata

Binomial name
- Euphorbia serrata L.

= Euphorbia serrata =

Species of flowering plant

Euphorbia serrata is a species of spurge known by the common names serrated spurge and sawtooth spurge, and also known as Tintern spurge and upright spurge. It is native to Europe but it is present elsewhere as a weedy introduced species. This is a perennial herb growing anywhere from 20 centimetres to about half a metre in height. The leaves are long and very narrow on most of the plant, with more oval-shaped leaves toward the tips of the stems. They are finely toothed. At the ends of the branches are inflorescences of tiny flowers. The fruit is a spherical capsule about half a centimetre wide containing tiny gray seeds.
