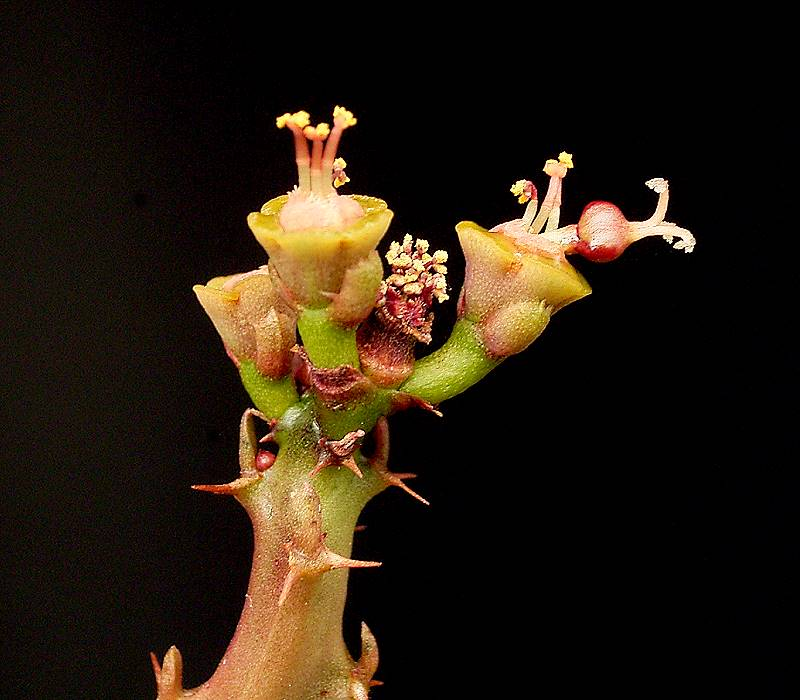

Scientific classification
- Kingdom: Plantae
- Clade: Tracheophytes
- Clade: Angiosperms
- Clade: Eudicots
- Clade: Rosids
- Order: Malpighiales
- Family: Euphorbiaceae
- Genus: Euphorbia
- Species: E. decidua

Binomial name
- Euphorbia decidua P. R. O. Bally & L. C. Leach

= Euphorbia decidua =

Species of flowering plant

Euphorbia decidua is a plant of the family Euphorbiaceae. It was described by Peter René Oscar Bally & Leslie Charles Leach in 1975. Its habitats are Zimbabwe, Zambia, Malawi and Zaire.

The flowers are pale green with a red centre.
