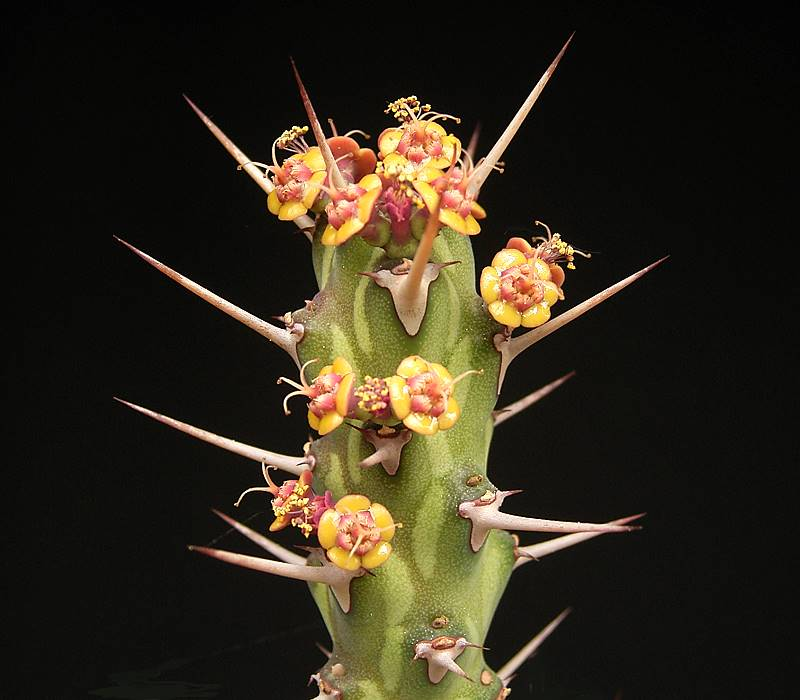
- CITES Appendix II (CITES)

Scientific classification
- Kingdom: Plantae
- Clade: Tracheophytes
- Clade: Angiosperms
- Clade: Eudicots
- Clade: Rosids
- Order: Malpighiales
- Family: Euphorbiaceae
- Genus: Euphorbia
- Species: E. actinoclada

Binomial name
- Euphorbia actinoclada S.Carter

= Euphorbia actinoclada =

Species of flowering plant

Euphorbia actinoclada is a species of plant in the family Euphorbiaceae. It is endemic to Kenya, Somalia, and Ethiopia. As most other succulent members of the genus Euphorbia, its trade is regulated under Appendix II of CITES.
