= Euphorbia hispida =

Scientific classification
- Kingdom: Plantae
- Clade: Tracheophytes
- Clade: Angiosperms
- Clade: Eudicots
- Clade: Rosids
- Order: Malpighiales
- Family: Euphorbiaceae
- Genus: Euphorbia
- Species: E. hispida

Binomial name
- Euphorbia hispida Boiss.

Synonyms
- Chamaesyce emodi (Hook.f.) Soják; Chamaesyce hispida (Boiss.) V.S.Raju & P.N.Rao; Euphorbia calliadena Engelm. ex Boiss.; Euphorbia emodi Hook.f.

Species of plant

Euphorbia hispida is a species of flowering plant in the family Euphorbiaceae, native to Afghanistan, Bangladesh, India, Iran, Kuwait, Pakistan and Western Himalaya. It was first described by Pierre Edmond Boissier in 1860.
