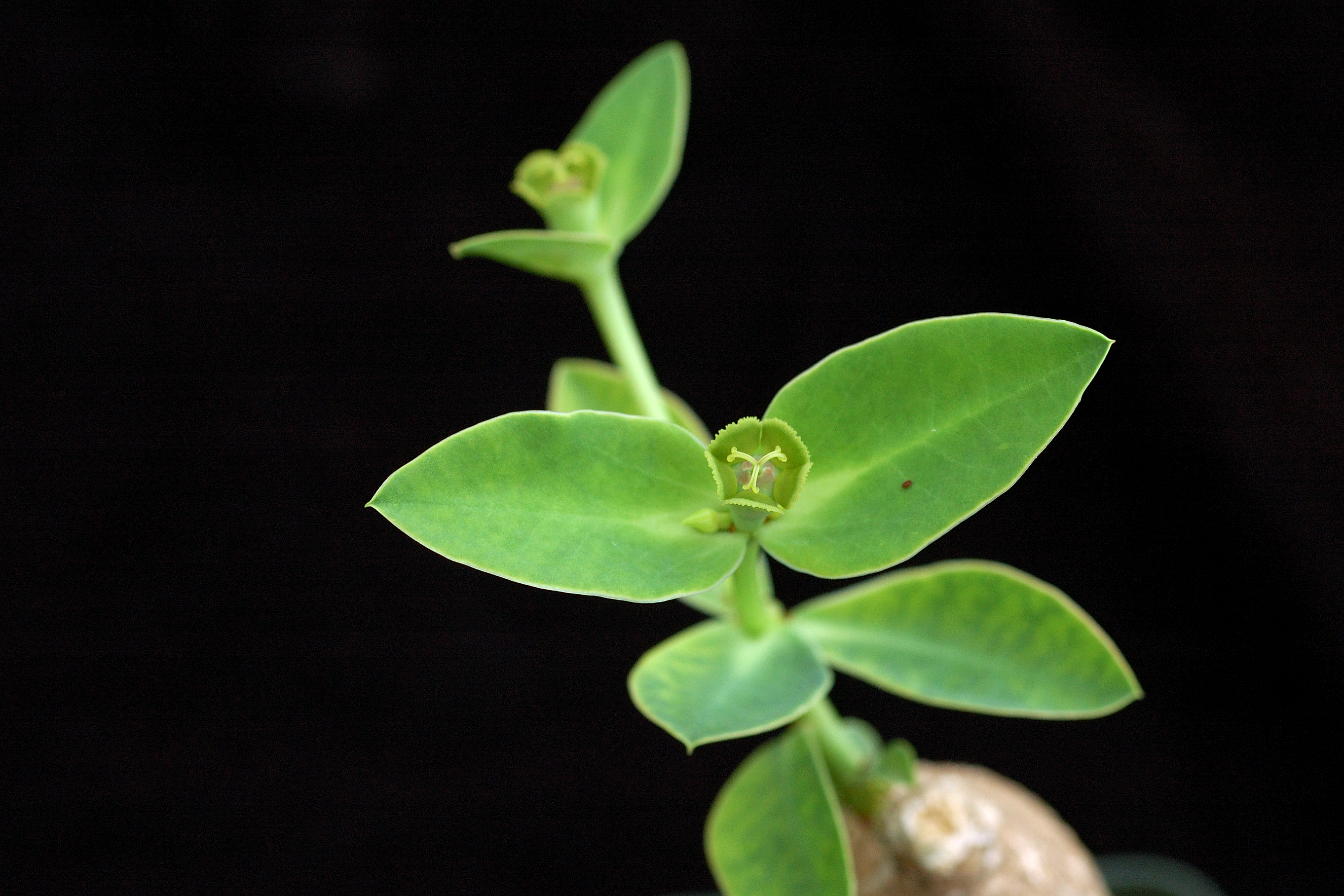

Scientific classification
- Kingdom: Plantae
- Clade: Tracheophytes
- Clade: Angiosperms
- Clade: Eudicots
- Clade: Rosids
- Order: Malpighiales
- Family: Euphorbiaceae
- Genus: Euphorbia
- Species: E. maritae

Binomial name
- Euphorbia maritae Rauh

= Euphorbia maritae =

Species of flowering plant

Euphorbia maritae is a species of perennial flowering plant in the family Euphorbiaceae. It takes its name from the discoverer, Marita Specks, who collected the first known specimen in Tanzania with her husband Ernst Specks in 1999.
