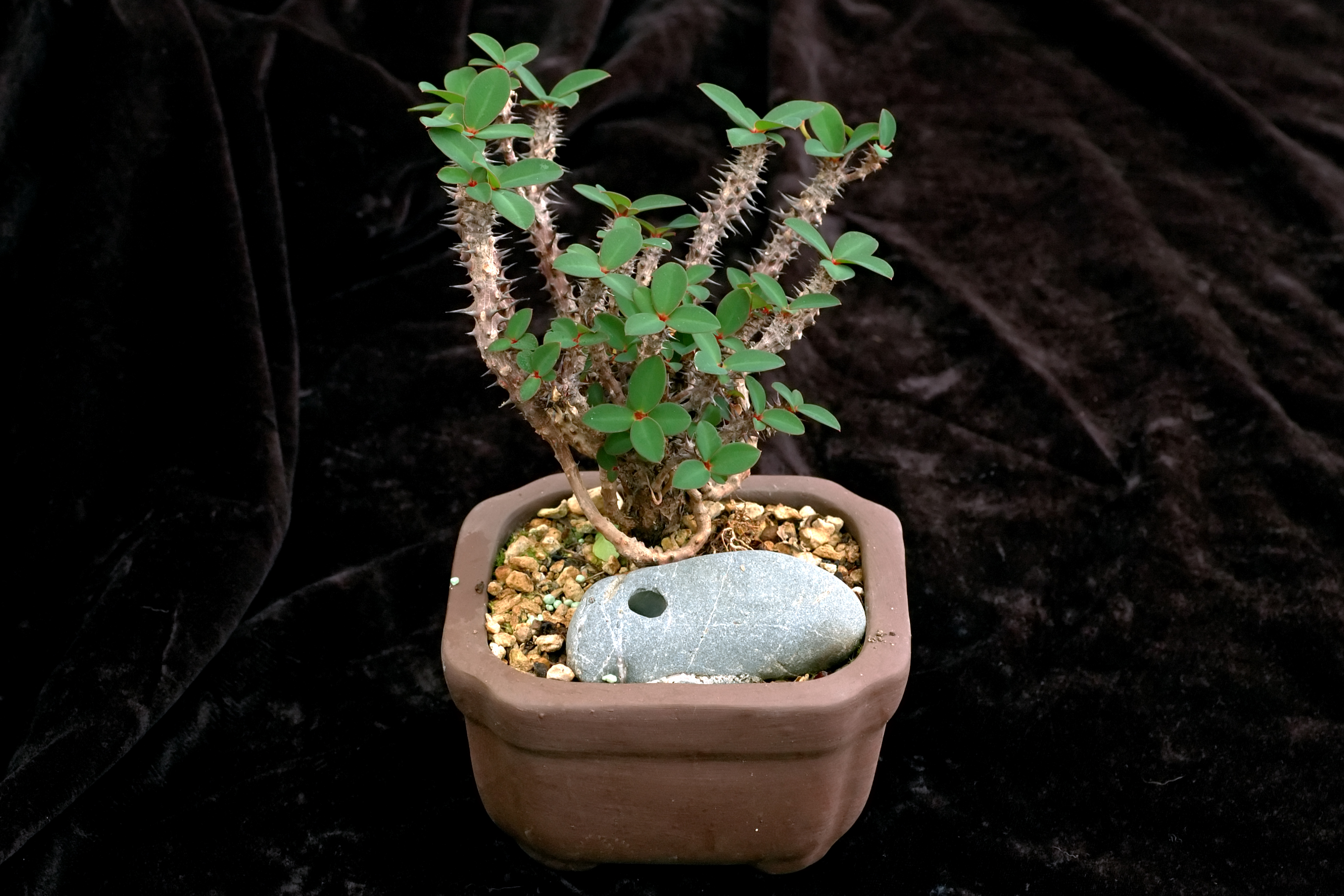

Conservation status
- Vulnerable (IUCN 3.1)

Scientific classification
- Kingdom: Plantae
- Clade: Embryophytes
- Clade: Tracheophytes
- Clade: Spermatophytes
- Clade: Angiosperms
- Clade: Eudicots
- Clade: Rosids
- Order: Malpighiales
- Family: Euphorbiaceae
- Genus: Euphorbia
- Species: E. bulbispina

Binomial name
- Euphorbia bulbispina Rauh & Razaf., 1991

= Euphorbia bulbispina =

Species of flowering plant in the spurge family

Euphorbia bulbispina is a spiny plant of the family Euphorbiaceae. It was described by Rauh & Razafindratsira in Euphorbia Journal 7: 31. 1991. It is endemic to a very small area in northern Madagascar where it is found in rock cracks in the Antsiranana district.

It has been assessed as vulnerable on the IUCN Red List.
