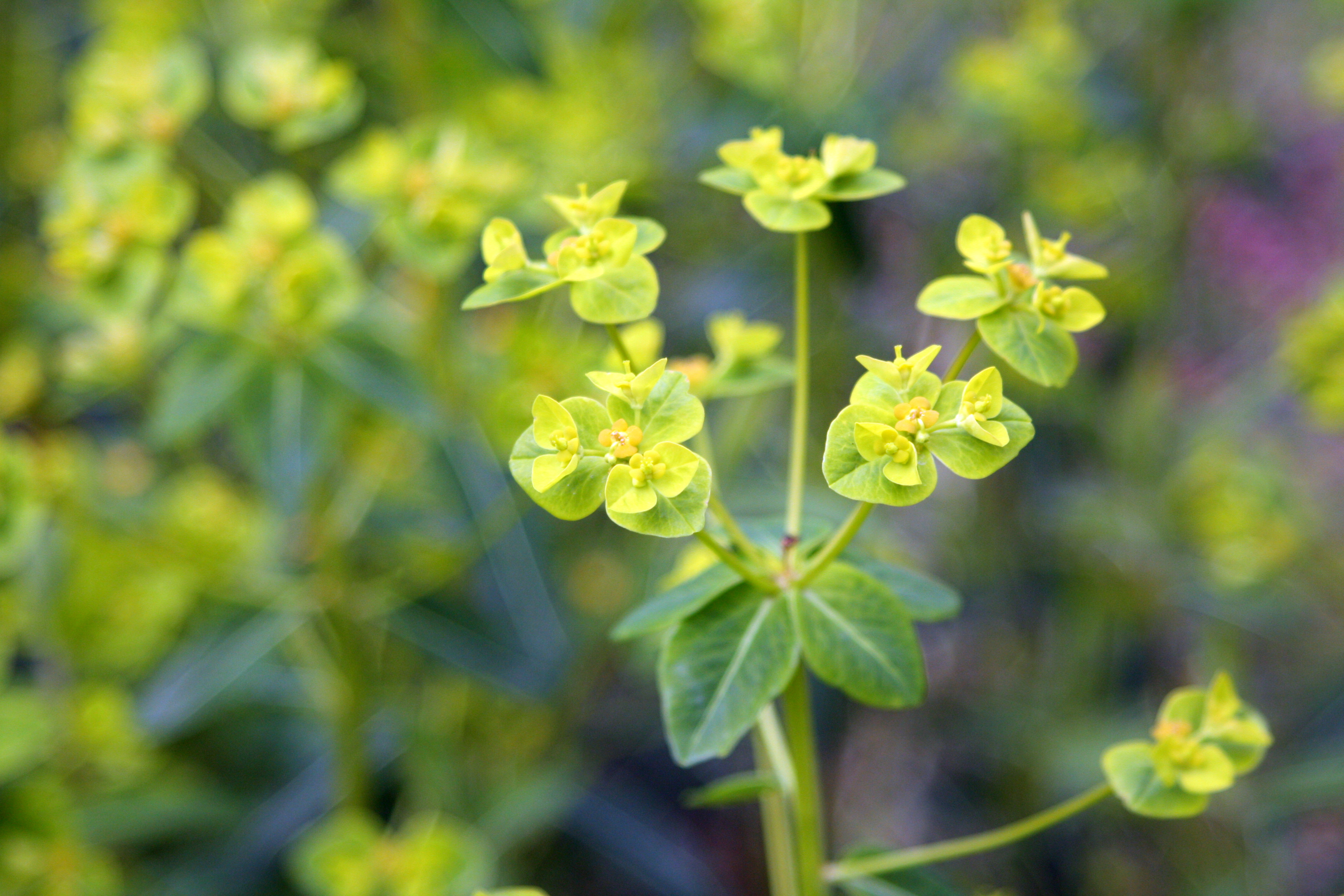

Scientific classification
- Kingdom: Plantae
- Clade: Tracheophytes
- Clade: Angiosperms
- Clade: Eudicots
- Clade: Rosids
- Order: Malpighiales
- Family: Euphorbiaceae
- Genus: Euphorbia
- Species: E. pekinensis

Binomial name
- Euphorbia pekinensis Rupr.

= Euphorbia pekinensis =

Species of flowering plant

Euphorbia pekinensis, the Peking spurge, is a flowering plant native to Asia.

== Medicinal uses ==
It is one of the 50 fundamental herbs used in traditional Chinese medicine, where it is called dàjǐ (Chinese: 大戟).

== See also ==
- Chinese herbology 50 fundamental herbs
