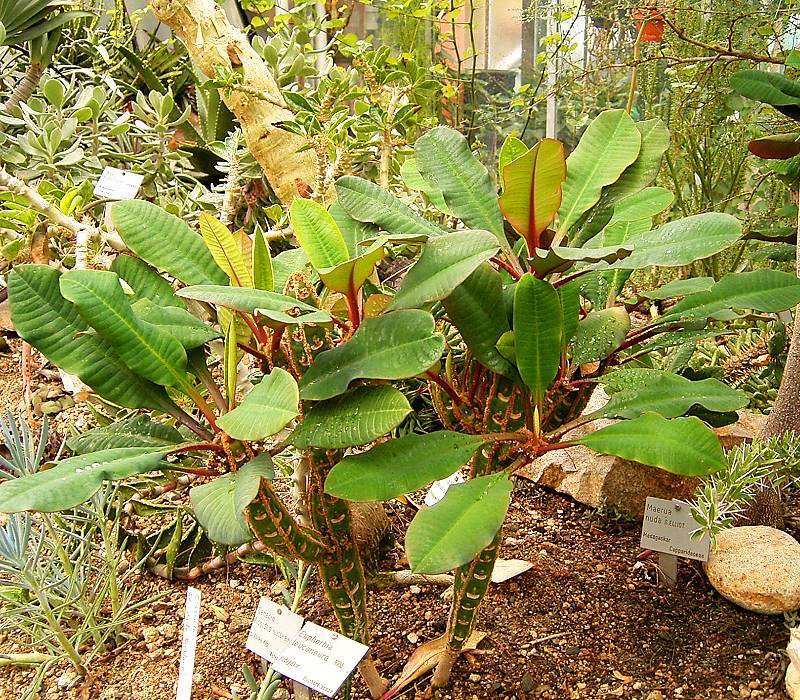

Conservation status
- Vulnerable (IUCN 3.1)
- CITES Appendix II

Scientific classification
- Kingdom: Plantae
- Clade: Embryophytes
- Clade: Tracheophytes
- Clade: Spermatophytes
- Clade: Angiosperms
- Clade: Eudicots
- Clade: Rosids
- Order: Malpighiales
- Family: Euphorbiaceae
- Genus: Euphorbia
- Species: E. leuconeura

Binomial name
- Euphorbia leuconeura Boiss.

Synonyms
- Euphorbia lathyrus (lapsus)

= Euphorbia leuconeura =

Species of flowering plant

Euphorbia leuconeura is a species of flowering plant in the family Euphorbiaceae. Its common name is Madagascar jewel. It is endemic to Madagascar where its natural habitat is forest undergrowth in rocky areas. It can grow to a height of 1.8 m (6 ft), as a branching small tree, and propagates by shooting its seeds several feet into the air. It is threatened by habitat loss.

== Taxonomy ==
The specific epithet leuconeura is derived from the two Ancient Greek words λευκός (leukós), meaning "bright, white", and νευρά (neurá), meaning "nerve".

== Cultivation ==
The Madagascar Jewel is grown as a houseplant for its attractive foliage: dark green leaves, with white veins when young. Unlike many succulents, E. leuconeura is less susceptible to overwatering. It grows best in partial shade but tolerates full shade and is relatively easy to care for providing it is not exposed to cold drafts.

== Toxicity ==
When damaged, the plant secretes a white fluid which is toxic and can cause severe skin irritation. This is typical of most Euphorbia species.

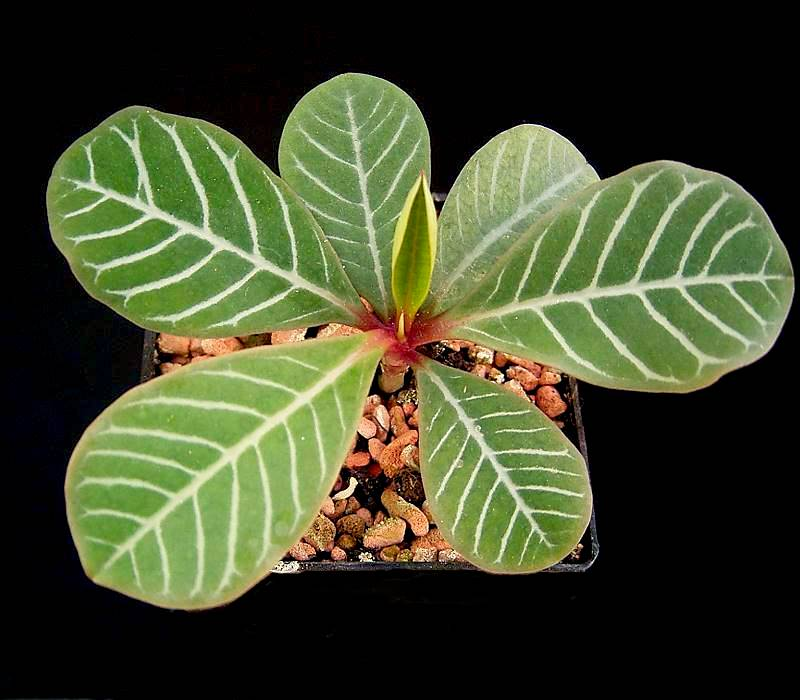
Close-up on the white veins

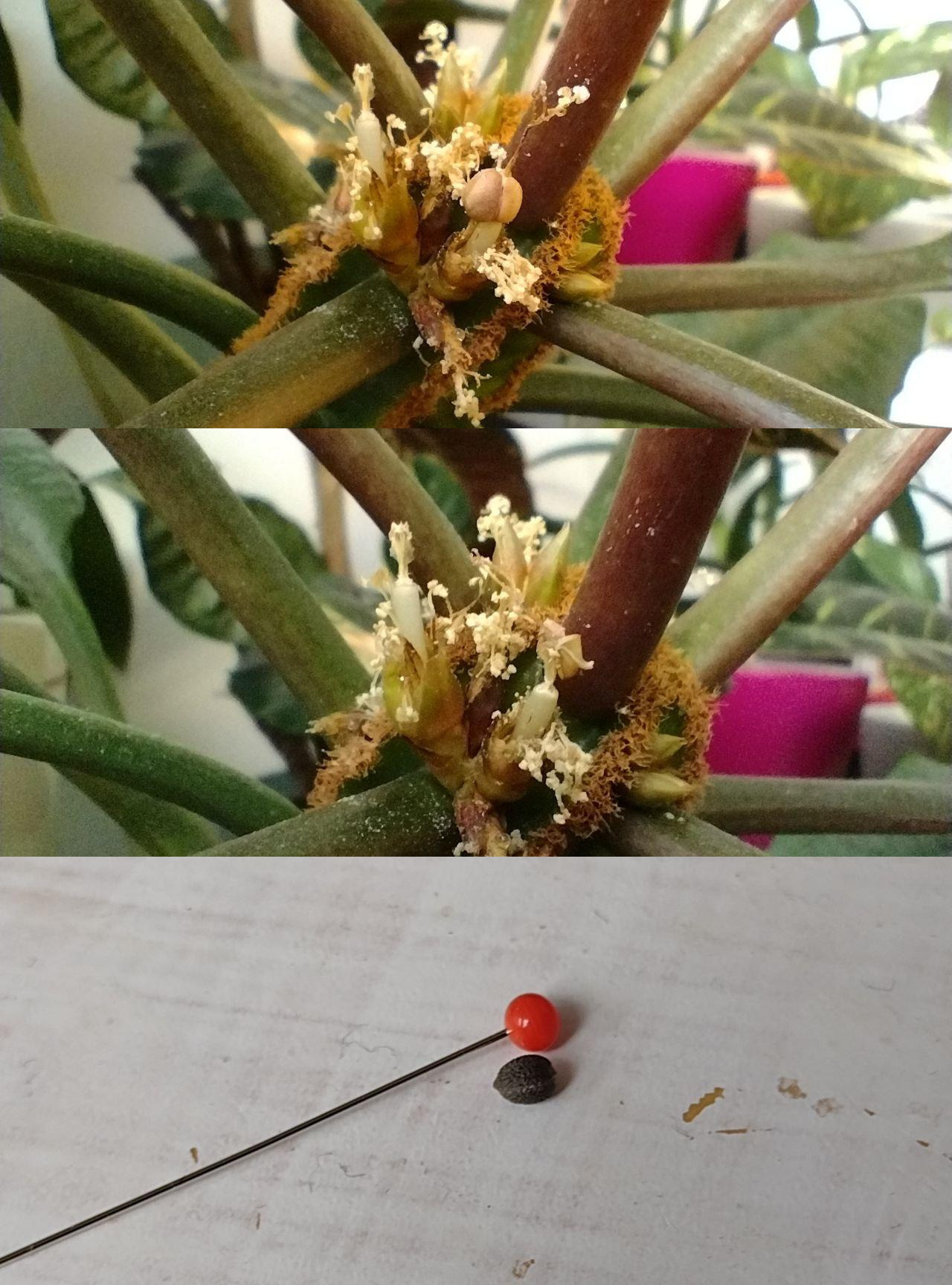
Euphorbia leuconeura flowering stalk before (top) and after seed disperal. Seed compared in size to a pinhead (bottom).
