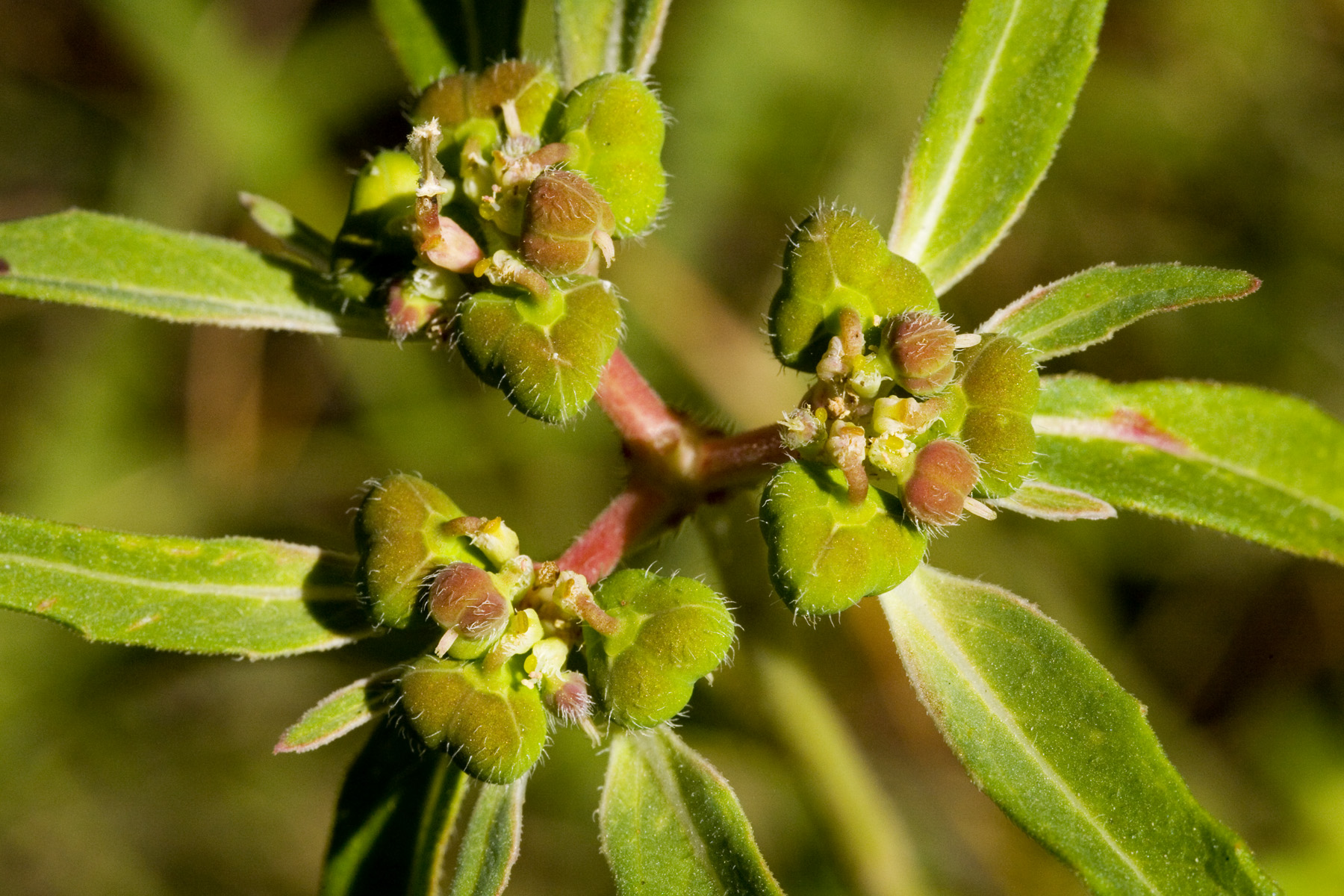

Scientific classification
- Kingdom: Plantae
- Clade: Tracheophytes
- Clade: Angiosperms
- Clade: Eudicots
- Clade: Rosids
- Order: Malpighiales
- Family: Euphorbiaceae
- Genus: Euphorbia
- Species: E. cuphosperma

Binomial name
- Euphorbia cuphosperma (Engelm.) Boiss.

Synonyms
- Euphorbia dentata var. cuphosperma Engelm. (1859); Euphorbia dentata f. cuphosperma (Engelm.) Fernald (1948); Poinsettia cuphosperma (Engelm.) Small (1903); Poinsettia dentata var. cuphosperma (Engelm.) Mohlenbr. (1982)

= Euphorbia cuphosperma =

Species of flowering plant

Euphorbia cuphosperma, hairy-fruit spurge, is a species of flowering plant.

== Description ==
Euphorbia cuphosperma is an herbaceous, annual plant with a taproot. It stands up to 20cm tall (~8 inches). The whole plant is hairy to various degrees. Leaf blades can vary greatly in shape, with margins which can be toothed or not. Beneath the flowers, whorls of leaf-like, green bracts often fan out, somewhat framing the flowers and fruits.

== Distribution ==
As seen on the iNaturalist map of documented observations, Euphorbia cuphosperma occurs in the southwestern states of Arizona and New Mexico. Surprisingly, it appears to be absent from northwestern Mexico, while the main body of its population occurs in mountainous central and northeastern Mexico, south into Oaxaca state. Plus there may be a report from highland Guatemala.

== Habitat ==
In the US, Euphorbia cuphosperma inhabits open forests in the mountains and canyons, pinyon-juniper forests, montane grasslands, stream beds and disturbed habitats at elevations of 800–2000m (~2600-6600feet). In highland Valley of Mexico it's described as found in scrub and grasslands in semi-arid areas, especially in disturbed and waste parts at elevations of 2250-2700m (~8200-8850m), where apparently it's never very common.

== Ethnobotany ==
In Mexico the plant has been taken by mothers to induce milk production.

== Etymology ==
The genus name Euphorbia was published by Linnaeus in the first edition of his book Species Plantarum, in 1753 (p. 450). However, Linnaeus chose a pre-existing name, one going back at least as far as the Roman writer, scientist and army officer Pliny the Elder, who used this name for a plant in his book Naturalis historia or Natural History, dated 79AD. Pliny wrote that the name was coined by Juba I of Numidia, to honor a physician who had cured him of a disorder, and that physician's name was Euphorbus. Probably that plant was the Resin Spurge, Euphorbia resinifera.

The species name cuphosperma is from the Greek kyphos, meaning "curved," and sperma for "seed" -- "curved seed."

== Taxonomy ==
After sequencing samples of nuclear DNA in chloroplasts extracted from cells of 291 Euphorbia taxa, Euphorbia cuphospera was determined to be belong in the subgenus Chamaesyce, section Poinsettia, and subsection Stormieae. Further, Euphorbia cuphospera was found to be the sister species of the Green Poinsettia, Euphorbia dentata, and very closely related to the Christmas Poinsettia, Euphorbia pulcherrima.

== Gallery ==
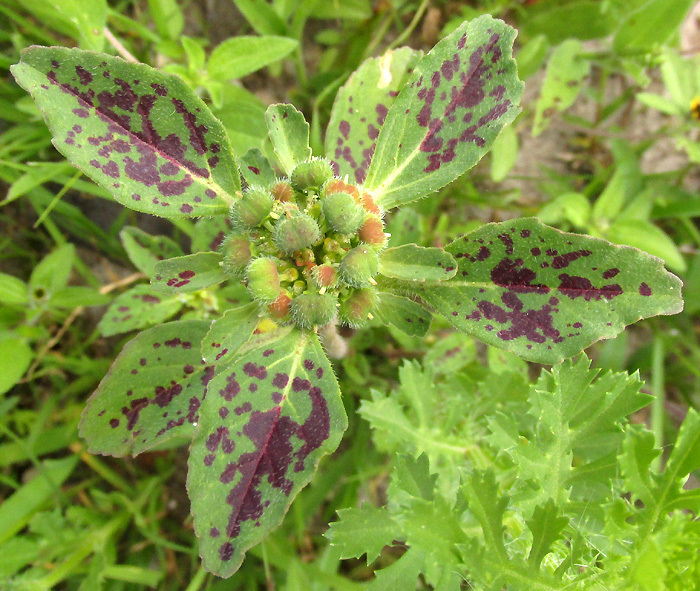
speckled bracts subtending inflorescence

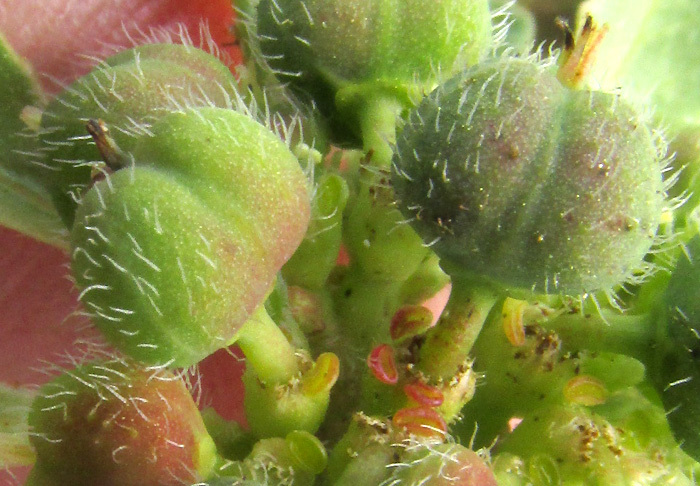
hairy fruits of Euphorbia cuphosperma

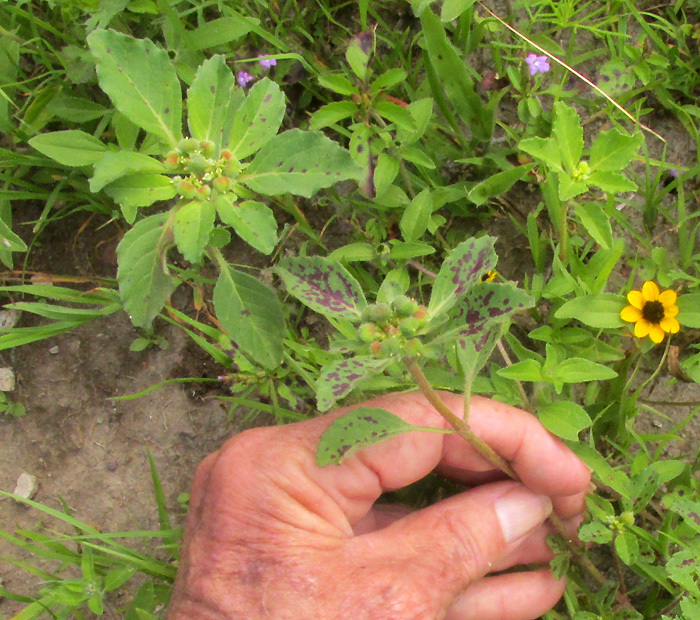
plant as weed in abandoned field in central Mexico
