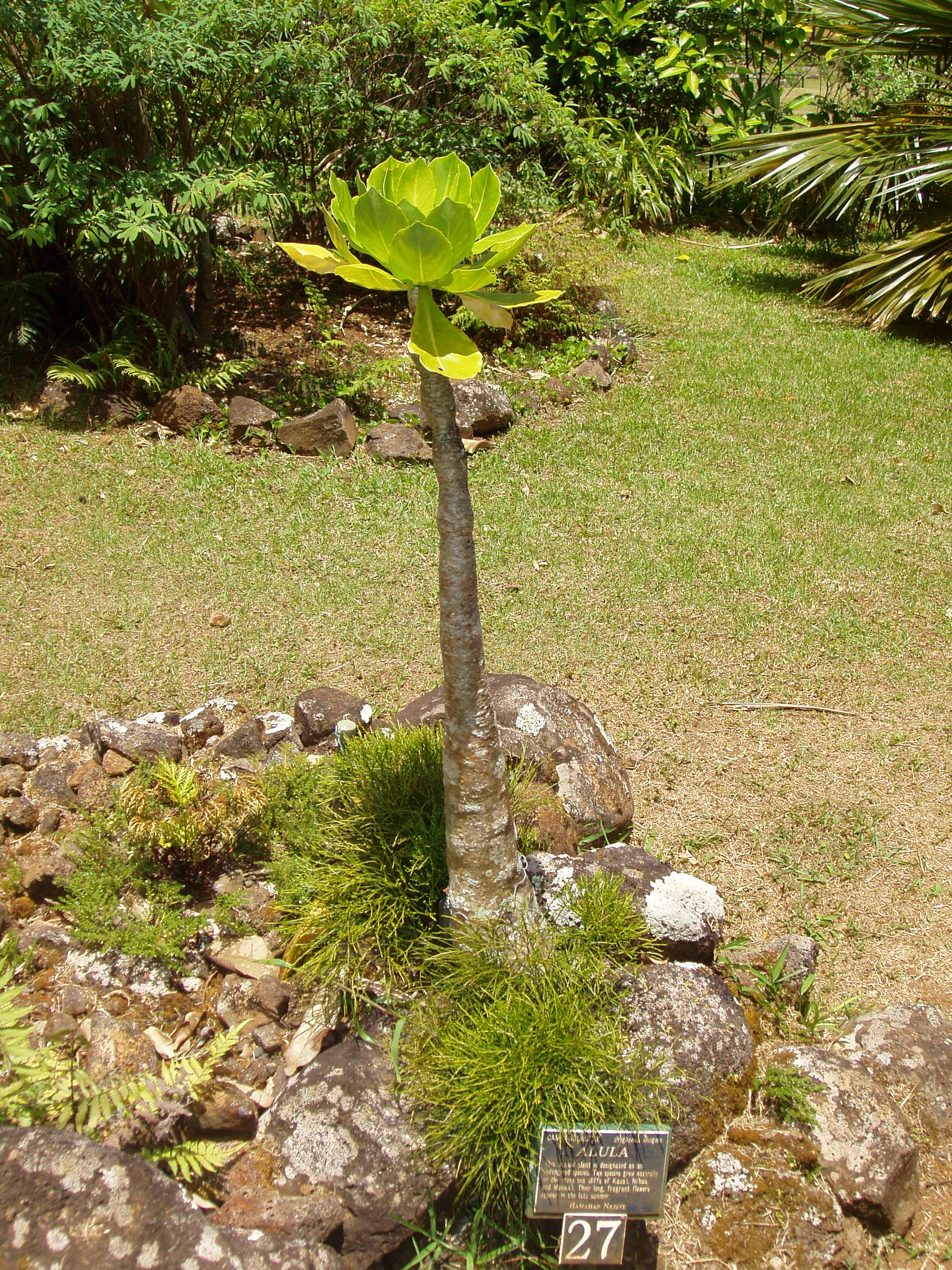

Conservation status
- Extinct in the Wild (IUCN 3.1)

- Critically Imperiled (NatureServe)

Scientific classification
- Kingdom: Plantae
- Clade: Embryophytes
- Clade: Tracheophytes
- Clade: Spermatophytes
- Clade: Angiosperms
- Clade: Eudicots
- Clade: Asterids
- Order: Asterales
- Family: Campanulaceae
- Genus: Brighamia
- Species: B. insignis

Binomial name
- Brighamia insignis A.Gray
- Brighamia insignis is endemic to Hawaii

Synonyms
- Brighamia citrina (C.N.Forbes & Lydgate) H.St.John; Brighamia citrina var. napoliensis H.St.John; Brighamia insignis f. citrina C.N.Forbes & Lydgate

= Brighamia insignis =

Species of flowering plant in the bellflower family Campanulaceae

Brighamia insignis, commonly known as ʻŌlulu or Alula in Hawaiian, or colloquially as the vulcan palm or cabbage on a stick, is a species of Hawaiian lobelioid in the bellflower family, Campanulaceae. It was native to the islands of Kauaʻi and Niʻihau, but has been extinct in the wild since at least 2020. This short-lived perennial species is a member of a unique endemic Hawaiian genus with only one other species.

== Description ==
Brighamia insignis is a potentially branched plant with a succulent stem that is bulbous at the bottom and tapers toward the top, ending in a compact rosette of fleshy leaves. The stem is usually 1–2 m (3–7 ft) in height, but can reach 5 m (16 ft). The plant blooms in September through November. It has clusters of fragrant yellow flowers in groups of three to eight in the leaf axils. The scent has been compared to honeysuckle. Petals are fused into a tube 7 to 14 cm (3 to 5 1/2 in) long. The fruit is a capsule 13 to 19 mm (1/2 to 3/4 in) long containing numerous seeds.

== Distribution and habitat ==
Brighamia insignis was found at elevations from sea level to 480 m (1,570 ft) in mesic shrublands and dry forests that receive less than 170 cm (67 in) of annual rainfall. It grew on rocky ledges with little soil and steep sea cliffs. Associated plants include ʻāhinahina (Artemisia spp.) ʻakoko (Euphorbia celastroides), alaheʻe (Psydrax odorata), kāwelu (Eragrostis variabilis), pili (Heteropogon contortus), kokiʻo ʻula (Hibiscus kokio), ʻānaunau (Lepidium serra), nehe (Lipochaeta succulenta), pokulakalaka (Munroidendron racemosum), and ʻilima (Sida fallax).

B. insignis is now extinct in the wild, having been in decline for many years. In 1994, the United States Fish and Wildlife Service reported five populations totaling 45 to 65 individuals, and listed the plant as an endangered species. The last single individual was recorded in the wild in August 2012, and drone surveys in June 2019 and May 2020 found that it, too, had disappeared.

== Endangered status ==
Brighamia insignis evolved to be pollinated exclusively by the fabulous green sphinx moth, which was thought to be extinct in the wild until it was rediscovered in 1998. This has made it all but impossible for B. insignis to reproduce on its own. Therefore, individuals only produce seed when artificially pollinated by humans.

Other threats to the species have included exotic plant species, feral goats and pigs, slugs, rats, fire, and infestations of carmine spider mites (Tetranychus cinnabarinus). There is also a hiking trail near one of the former populations. The plant grew on steep, exposed cliffs and were prone to damage by hurricanes and landslides. In 1992, the remaining populations on the southeastern coast of Kauaʻi were wiped out by Hurricane Iniki, leaving only the populations on the island's north coast, which themselves continued to decline thereafter.

== Cultivation ==
Although extinct in the wild, B. insignis is not hard to cultivate in a nursery, and it has come into use as a novel ornamental plant.

== Gallery ==
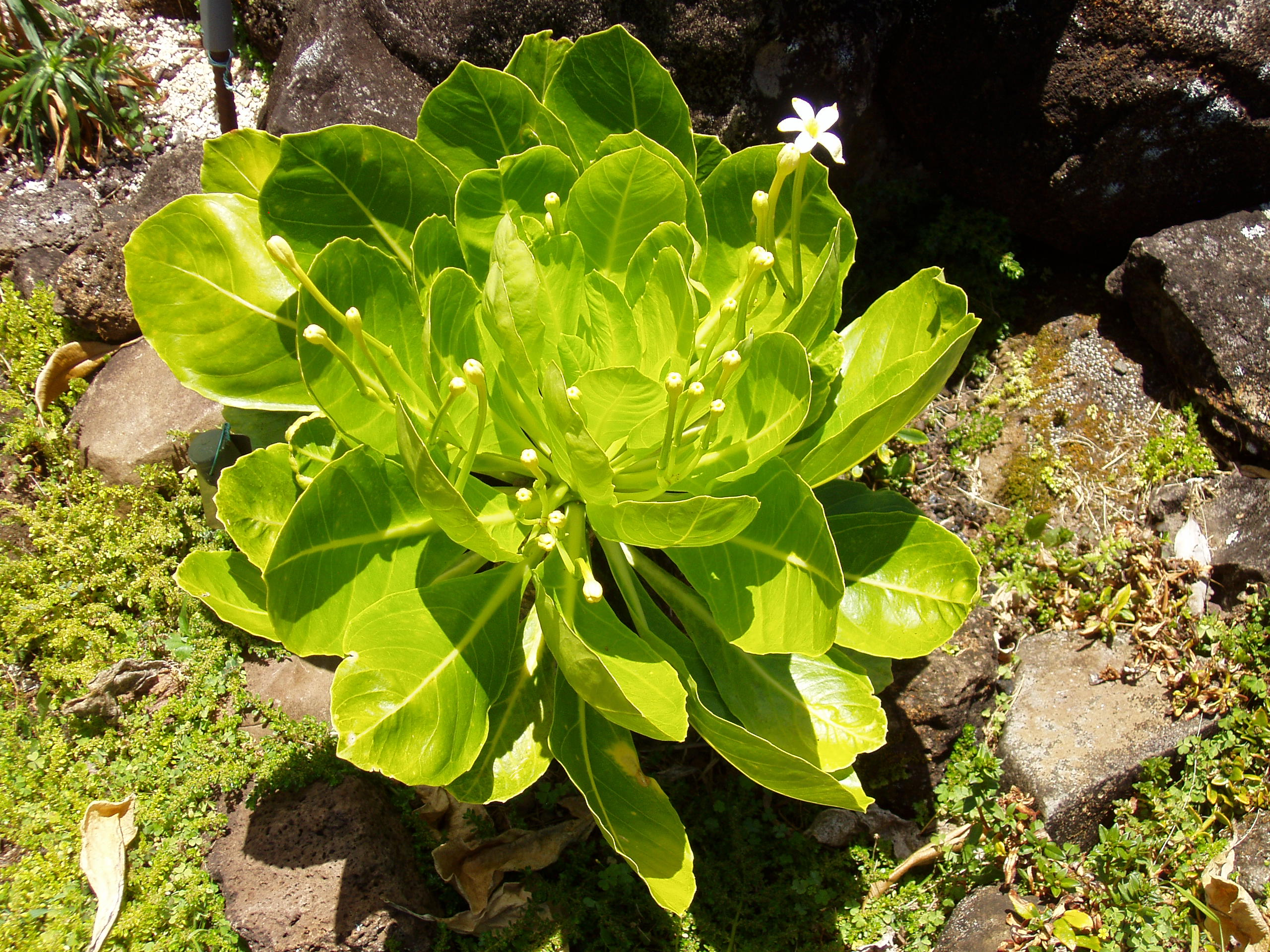
Flowers of the Brighamia insignis

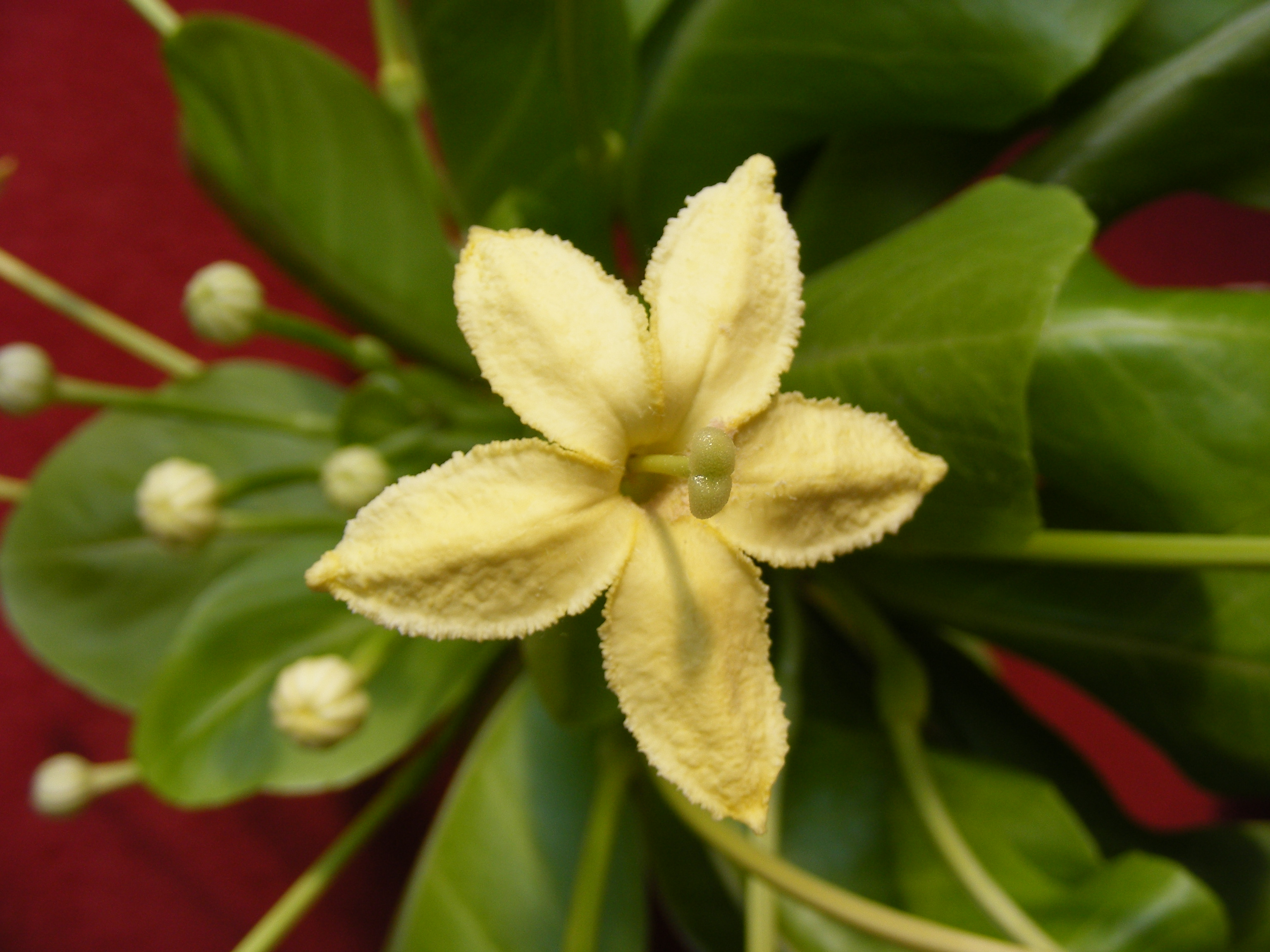
Closeup of a flower

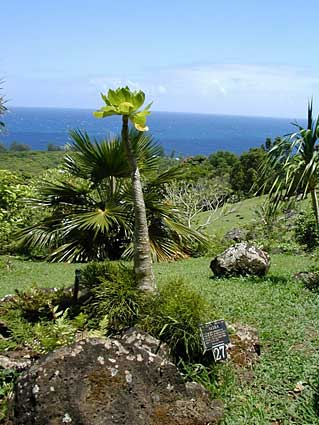
An alula plant at Limahuli Garden and Preserve, Kauaʻi.
