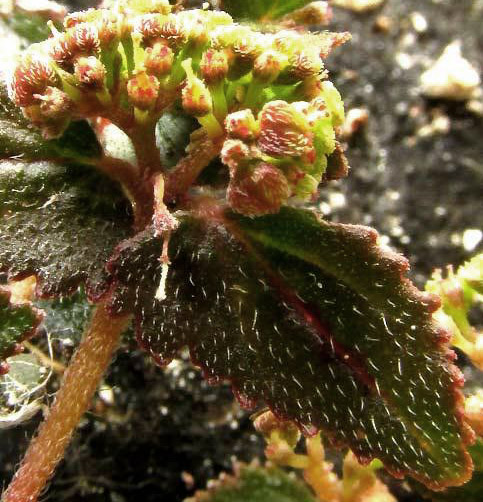

Scientific classification
- Kingdom: Plantae
- Clade: Tracheophytes
- Clade: Angiosperms
- Clade: Eudicots
- Clade: Rosids
- Order: Malpighiales
- Family: Euphorbiaceae
- Genus: Euphorbia
- Species: E. ophthalmica

Binomial name
- Euphorbia ophthalmica Pers.

Synonyms
- Chamaesyce ophthalmica (Pers.) D.G.Burch (1966); Euphorbia hirta var. ophthalmica (Pers.) Allem & Irgang (1975); Chamaesyce hirta var. procumbens Moldenke (1940); Chamaesyce hirta subsp. procumbens Croizat (1941); Chamaesyce pilulifera var. procumbens Small (1903); Euphorbia bicapitata Brandegee (1917); Euphorbia hirta var. procumbens (Boiss.) N.E.Br. (1911); Euphorbia pilulifera var. procumbens Boiss. (1862); Euphorbia procumbens DC. (1813)

= Euphorbia ophthalmica =

Species of flowering plant

Euphorbia ophthalmica, the Florida hammock sandmat, is a species of plant in the family Euphorbiaceae.

== Description ==
Euphorbia ophthalmica is an annual or short-lived perennial plant with a slender to slightly thickened taproot. Growing on or close to its substrate and forming mats, often it's considered a weed. Its body is covered with varying degrees of hairiness, often with somewhat stiff hairs bending close to the plant's surface. Leaves with asymmetric bases arise opposite one another on petioles up to 1.2mm long (3/64 inch), with blades up to 13mm long (~½ inch) and 7mm wide (9/32 inch). Blades are ovate or oblong, 3-veined from their bases, and with margins incised with coarse, low teeth. Often the green blades display a red spot in their centers; wounded blades secrete a toxic, white sap sometimes referred to as latex.

At stem tips, cyathium-type "false flowers," or pseudanthia, are distinctively densely packed in somewhat flat-topped inflorescences. Cub-like cyathia bear 4 yellow-green to pink glands which sometimes bear thin, white to pink rims. Male flowers in each cyathium number 2-8, while the single female flowers have hairy ovaries with styles divided into two from half to nearly their whole lengths. Capsule-type fruits are ovoid, hairy, and up to 1.3mm high (1/20 inch). Seeds are orange-brown to pinkish, narrowly ovoid, and almost smooth.

Frequently Euphorbia ophthalmica has been misidentified as Euphorbia hirta, which is larger and more "delicate" than Euphorbia ophthalmica. Also, inflorescences of Euphorbia hirta both terminate the stems and issue from short, leafless branches along the stem where leaf petioles attach, while Euphorbia ophthalmica inflorescences appear strictly at the tips of leafy stems.

== Habitat ==
Flowering and fruiting year-round, Euphorbia ophthalmica inhabits different kinds of disturbed sites, including lawns and roadsides. In the US, it occurs in hammock forests. In the Bahamas it also is found in burned-over piney woods.

== Human uses ==
=== Traditional medicine ===
As a traditional medicine in Mexico, the white latex and stems of Euphorbia ophthalmica have been used both cooked and raw for pimples, boils, sores and "mesquinos," understood to be warts or larger areas of rough, grainy-looking skin caused by Human papillomavirus infection.

All parts of the species are toxic and shouldn't be eaten.

=== Bioremediation ===
Euphorbia ophthalmica has been found to accumulate the heavy metal of lead and the sometimes toxic zinc. In the context of bioremediation, such accumulation of toxic minerals by plants, or phytoremediation, is considered to be a permanent solution for the removal of high levels of heavy metals from soils, if the contaminated plants are later removed and properly stored.

== Taxonomy ==
Euphorbia ophthalmica was first described for science in 1806, in the two-volume work by Christiaan Hendrik Persoon known as Synopsis Plantarum.

The species is regarded as belonging to the subgenus Chamaesyce, section Anisophyllum.

== Etymology ==
The genus name Euphorbia is an alteration of the Latin euphorbea, from Euphorbus, a 1st century a.d. Greek physician.

The species name ophthalmica is from the New Latin ophthalmicus, meaning "eye-doctor." In Persoon's formal description of Euphorbia ophthalmica he writes of the type specimen collected at Rio Janeiro "Remedium contra caecitatum ?" -- "Remedy for blindness?" However, this advice is dangerous since the white sap of many Euphorbia species is extremely irritating to the skin and eyes.

== Gallery ==
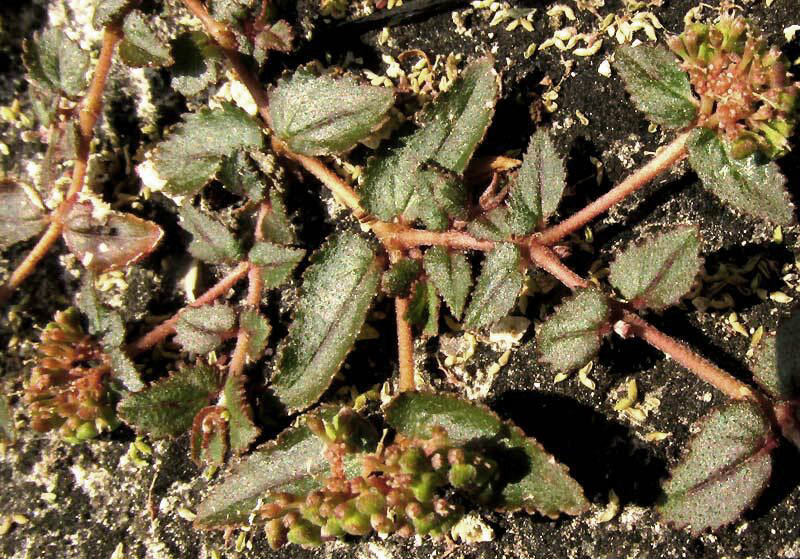
Euphorbia ophthalmica, branches of mat-forming body

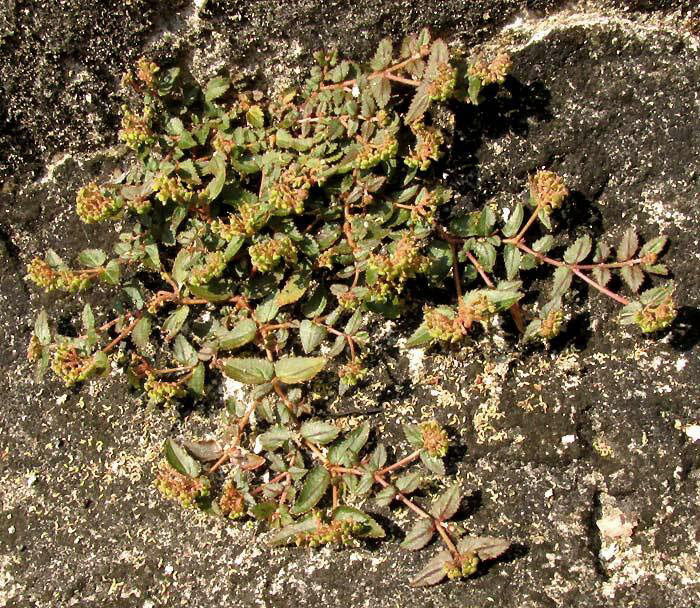
Euphorbia ophthalmica, mat-forming on very hot limestone step

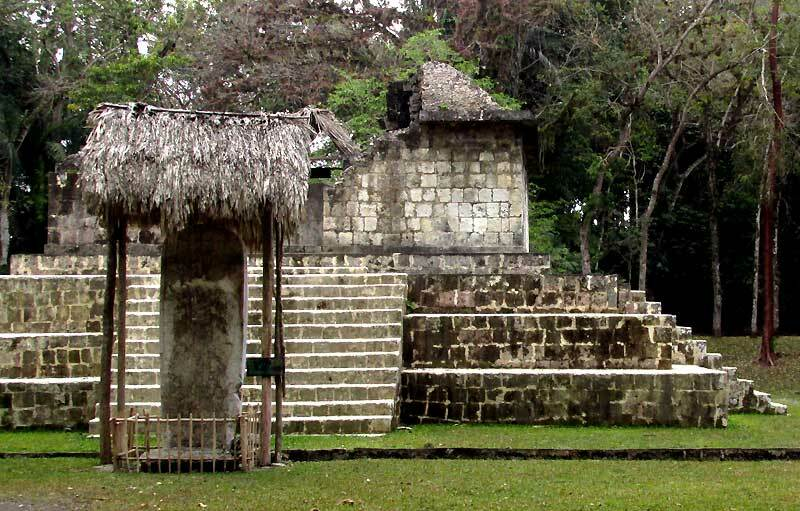
Euphorbia ophthalmica, the Maya ruin on which the plant grew, in Guatemala
