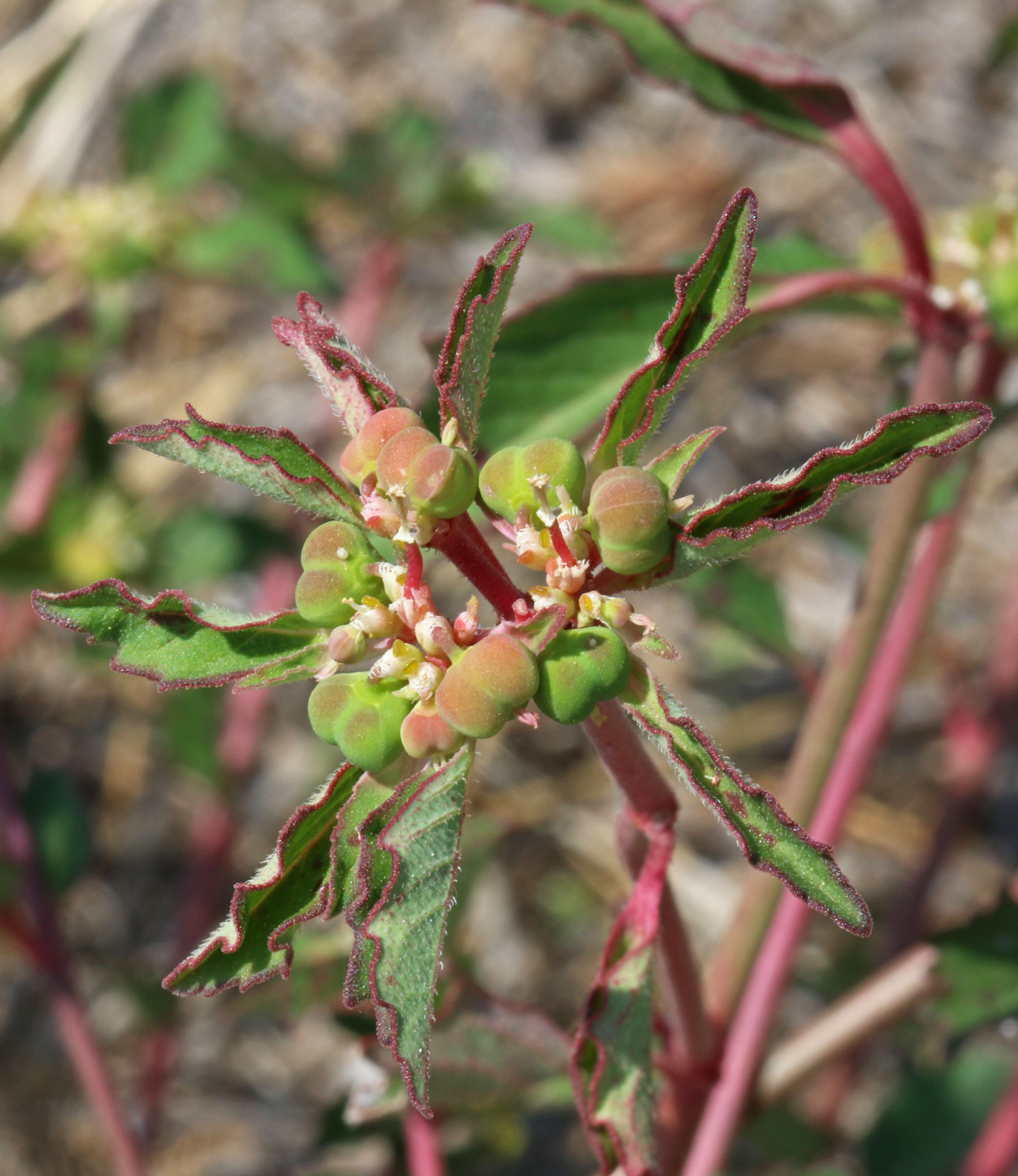

Scientific classification
- Kingdom: Plantae
- Clade: Embryophytes
- Clade: Tracheophytes
- Clade: Spermatophytes
- Clade: Angiosperms
- Clade: Eudicots
- Clade: Rosids
- Order: Malpighiales
- Family: Euphorbiaceae
- Genus: Euphorbia
- Subgenus: Euphorbia subg. Poinsettia
- Species: E. davidii

Binomial name
- Euphorbia davidii Subils

= Euphorbia davidii =

David's/toothed spurge, worldwide weed

Euphorbia davidii, known as David's spurge or toothed spurge, is a species of flowering plant in the spurge family Euphorbiaceae. It is an annual herb growing up to 2 feet (0.61 metres) tall. Leaves are opposite in arrangement with narrow to broadly elliptic blades.

== Distribution and habitat ==
Euphorbia davidii is native to parts of southwest and central North America. It is apparently not native to eastern and northern North America, South America, Australia, Russia, and other areas where it occurs worldwide. Euphorbia davidii is found in a variety of habitats, from forests, riparian areas, and prairies, to gravel roadsides and railroads.

=== As a pest ===
In March 2021 the EPPO (European and Mediterranean Plant Protection Organization) added E. davidii to its Alert List due to concerns it may move beyond its current habitats - railway lines - and into agricultural lands; and because it recently appeared in Central Russia.
