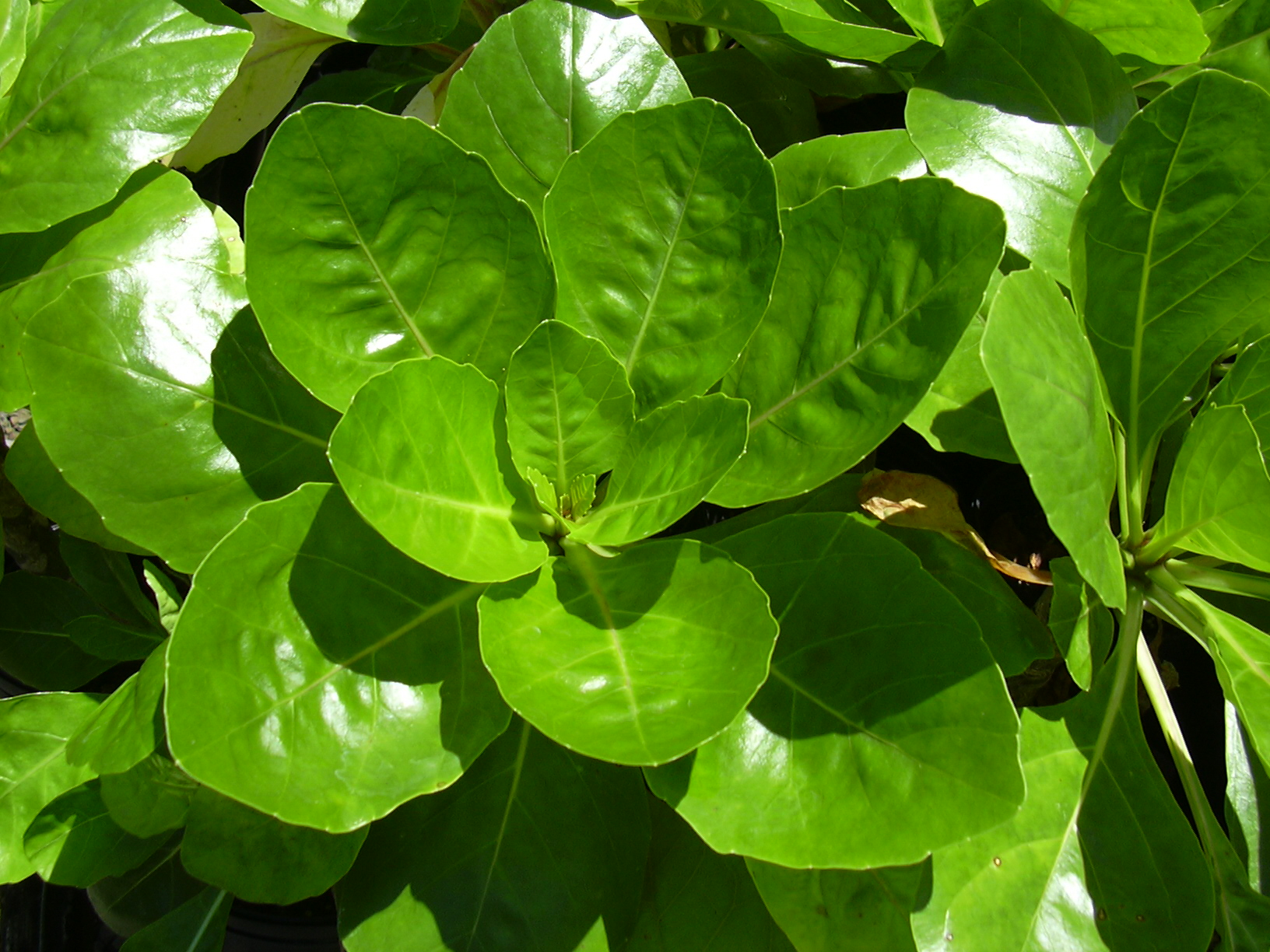

Conservation status
- Critically Endangered (IUCN 3.1)

- Critically Imperiled (NatureServe)

Scientific classification
- Kingdom: Plantae
- Clade: Tracheophytes
- Clade: Angiosperms
- Clade: Eudicots
- Clade: Asterids
- Order: Asterales
- Family: Campanulaceae
- Genus: Brighamia
- Species: B. rockii

Binomial name
- Brighamia rockii H.St.John

= Brighamia rockii =

Pua ʻala

Species of plant

Brighamia rockii, known as the Molokai ohaha or Pua ʻala in Hawaiian, is a species of flowering plant in the bellflower family, Campanulaceae, that is endemic to the island of Molokaʻi in Hawaii. Pua ʻala inhabits mesic shrublands and forests on rocky cliffs from sea level to 470 m (1,540 ft) on the island's northern windward coast. Associated plants include ʻōhiʻa lehua (Metrosideros polymorpha), alaheʻe (Psydrax odorata), lama (Diospyros sandwicensis), ʻūlei (Osteomeles anthyllidifolia), and naupaka (Scaevola gaudichaudii).

Pua ʻala reaches a height of 1–5 m (3.3–16.4 ft) and has a succulent, trunk-like stem that tapers from the base. The oval-shaped leaves are 6–22 cm (2.4–8.7 in) long and 1–15 cm (0.39–5.91 in) wide and form a rosette on the top of the plant. Each inflorescence contains three to eight trumpet-shaped white flowers.

== Conservation ==
Pua ʻala has been extirpated from the islands of Lānaʻi and Maui. Threats to its survival include habitat loss, competition with alien plants, predation by goats and deer, and a lack of pollinators.

There are five occurrences of the plant remaining in the wild, with a total estimated population of fewer than 200. It is federally listed as an endangered species. It is now pollinated by the introduced hawk moth Daphnis nerii.

Some individuals have been cultivated and planted in their native habitat.
