= Anisophyllum =

Anisophyllum may refer to one of two plant genera in the family Euphorbiaceae:

- Croton (Boivin ex Baill.)
- Euphorbia (Haw.)

== See also ==
- Euphorbia sect. Anisophyllum
