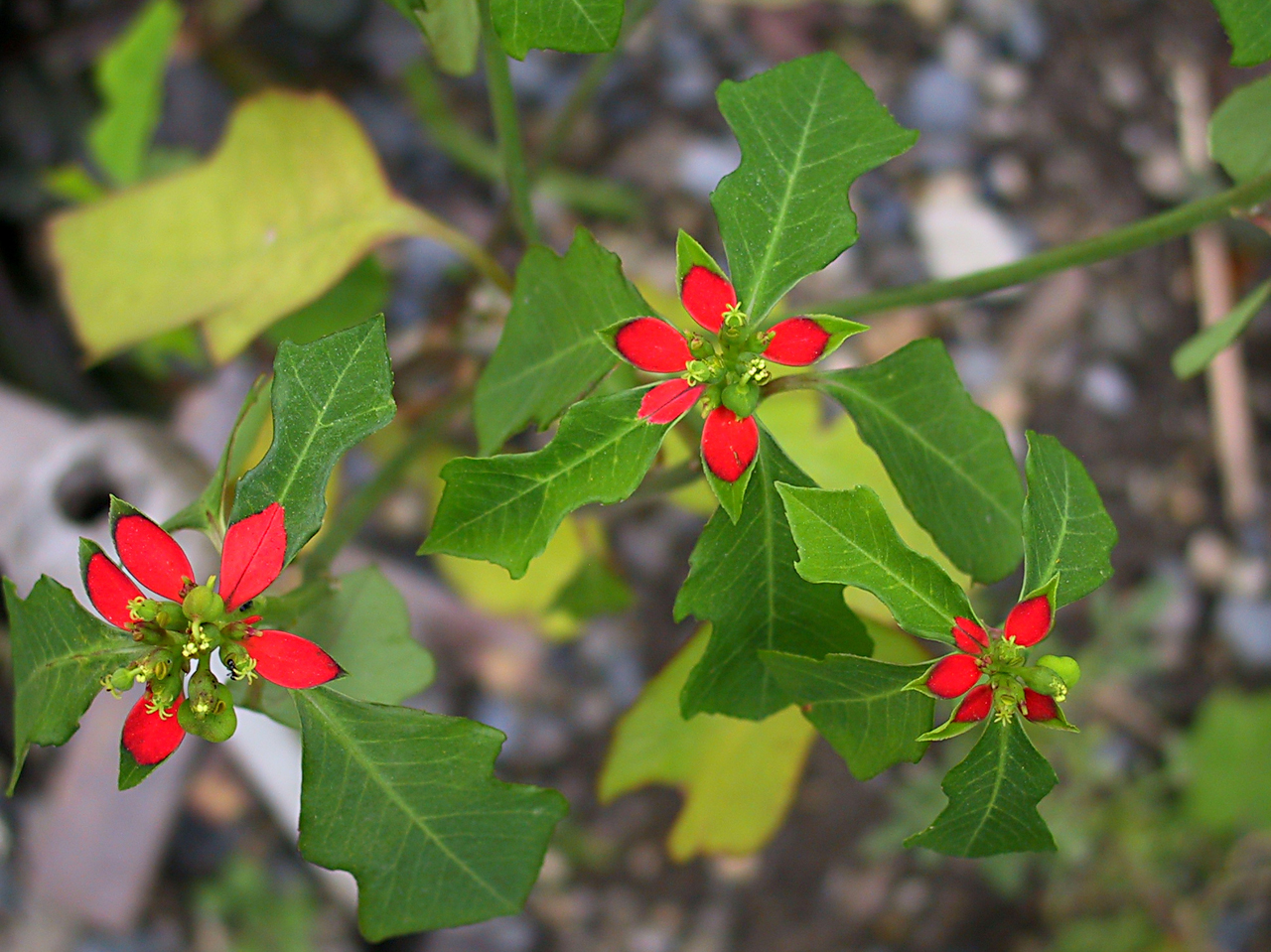

Scientific classification
- Kingdom: Plantae
- Clade: Tracheophytes
- Clade: Angiosperms
- Clade: Eudicots
- Clade: Rosids
- Order: Malpighiales
- Family: Euphorbiaceae
- Genus: Euphorbia
- Species: E. cyathophora

Binomial name
- Euphorbia cyathophora Murray

Synonyms
- List: Euphorbia barbellata Engelm.; Euphorbia graminifolia Michx. nom. illeg.; Euphorbia heterophylla var. barbellata (Engelm.) Holz.; Euphorbia heterophylla f. cyathophora (Murray) Voss; Euphorbia heterophylla var. cyathophora (Murray) Griseb.; Euphorbia heterophylla var. cyathophora (Murray) Boiss.; Euphorbia heterophylla var. graminifolia Engelm.; Euphorbia heterophylla var. minor Boiss.; Euphorbia pandurifolia Roth; Poinsettia barbellata (Engelm.) Small; Poinsettia cyathophora (Murray) Klotzsch & Garcke; Poinsettia cyathophora (Murray) Bartl.; Poinsettia edwardsii Klotzsch & Garcke; Poinsettia graminifolia (Chapm.) Millsp.; Poinsettia pinetorum Small; Tithymalus cyatophorus (Murray) Moench

= Euphorbia cyathophora =

Species of flowering plant

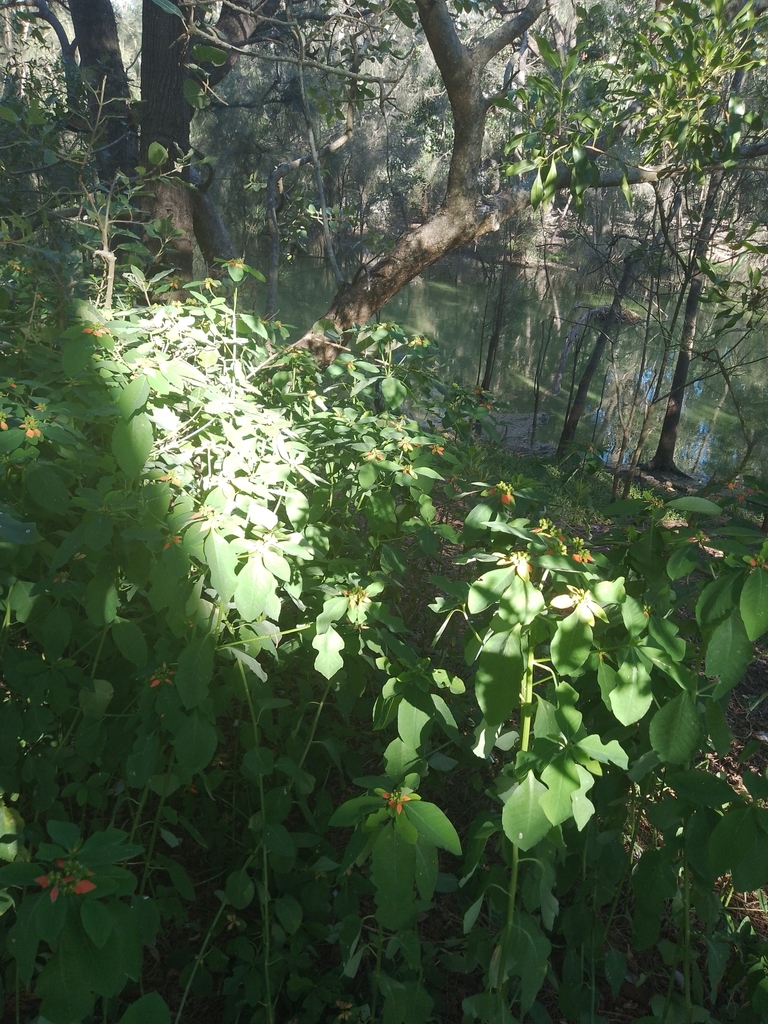
Euphorbia Cyathophora growing invasively in a Queensland forest.

Euphorbia cyathophora, known by various names including painted spurge, dwarf poinsettia, fire-on-the-mountain, paintedleaf, and wild poinsettia. Native to subtropical and tropical North and South America, it is widely naturalized elsewhere. They belong to the Cyathium type of inflorescence. Here, the inflorescence axis is convex in shape. Dwarf poinsettia is an annual herb growing up to 3 feet (0.91 metres) tall. It has green stems with leaves that are oblanceolate with lobed margins. It grows near disturbed sites.

== Invasiveness ==
Painted Spurge is naturalized in Queensland, New South Wales, Western Australia, including in national parks, such as Heron Island. It prefers open sunny areas and sandy soils, and therefore often invades coastal dunes. Due to its invasiveness, it is also found in smaller pantropical populations worldwide. It often forms dense clumps of plants, which are difficult to clear. It can spread via illegal dumping.

== Taxonomy ==
Like some of its common names suggest, Painted Spurge is in the Poinsettia subgenus and is closely related to the true poinsettia. Being in the Euphorbia genus, it is related to a number of invasive species.
