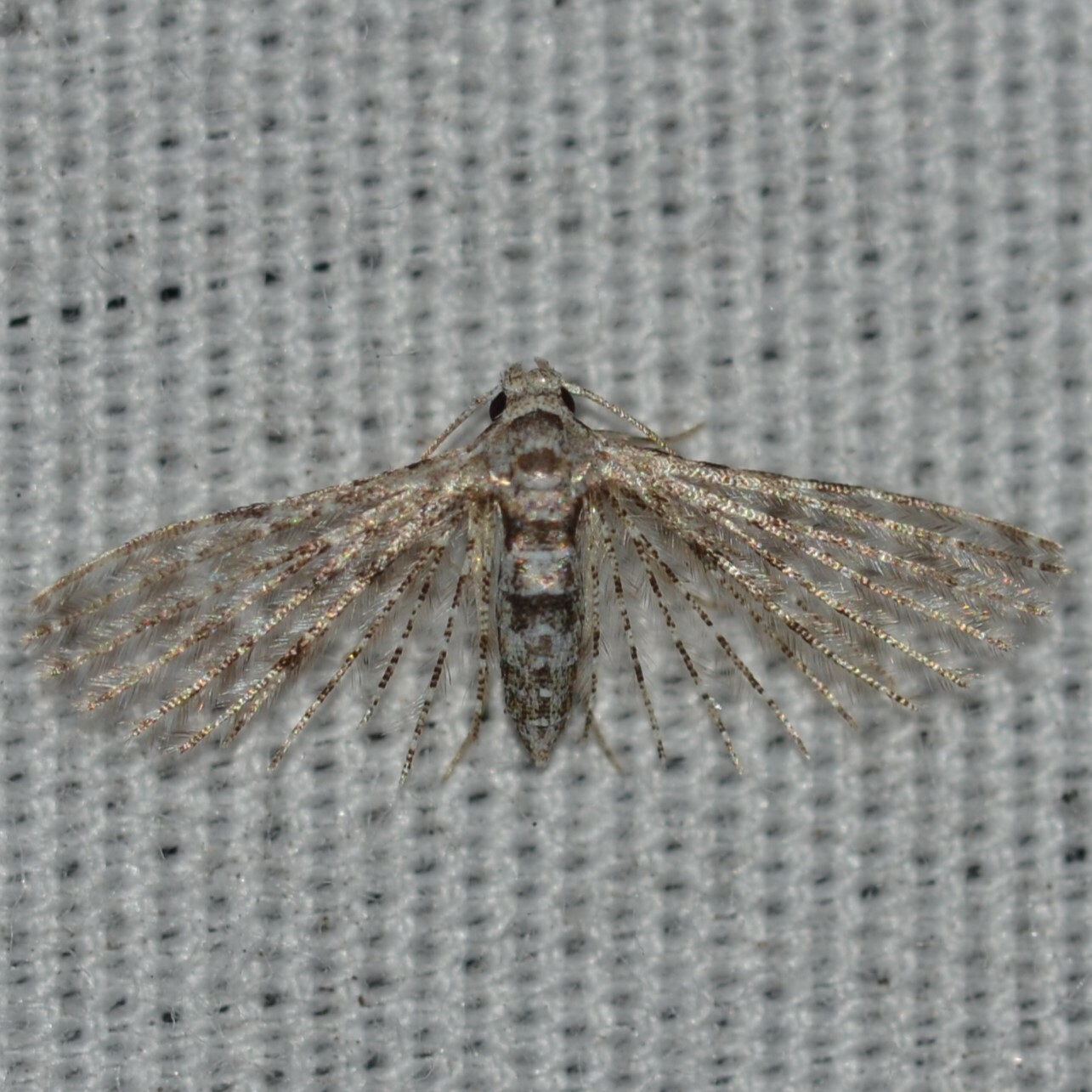

Scientific classification
- Kingdom: Animalia
- Phylum: Arthropoda
- Class: Insecta
- Order: Lepidoptera
- Family: Alucitidae
- Genus: Alucita
- Species: A. objurgatella

Binomial name
- Alucita objurgatella (Walsingham, 1907)

Synonyms
- Orneodes objurgatella Walsingham, 1907; Orneodes angustestriata Walsingham, 1907

= Alucita objurgatella =

Objurgatella moth

Species of many-plumed moth in genus Alucita

Alucita objurgatella, the objurgatella moth, is a moth of the family Alucitidae. It is known only from the Hawaiian islands of Kauai, Oahu, Maui and Hawaii, but is considered introduced although it could also be indigenous.

The larvae feed on the fruits, flowers and seeds of Psydrax odorata.
