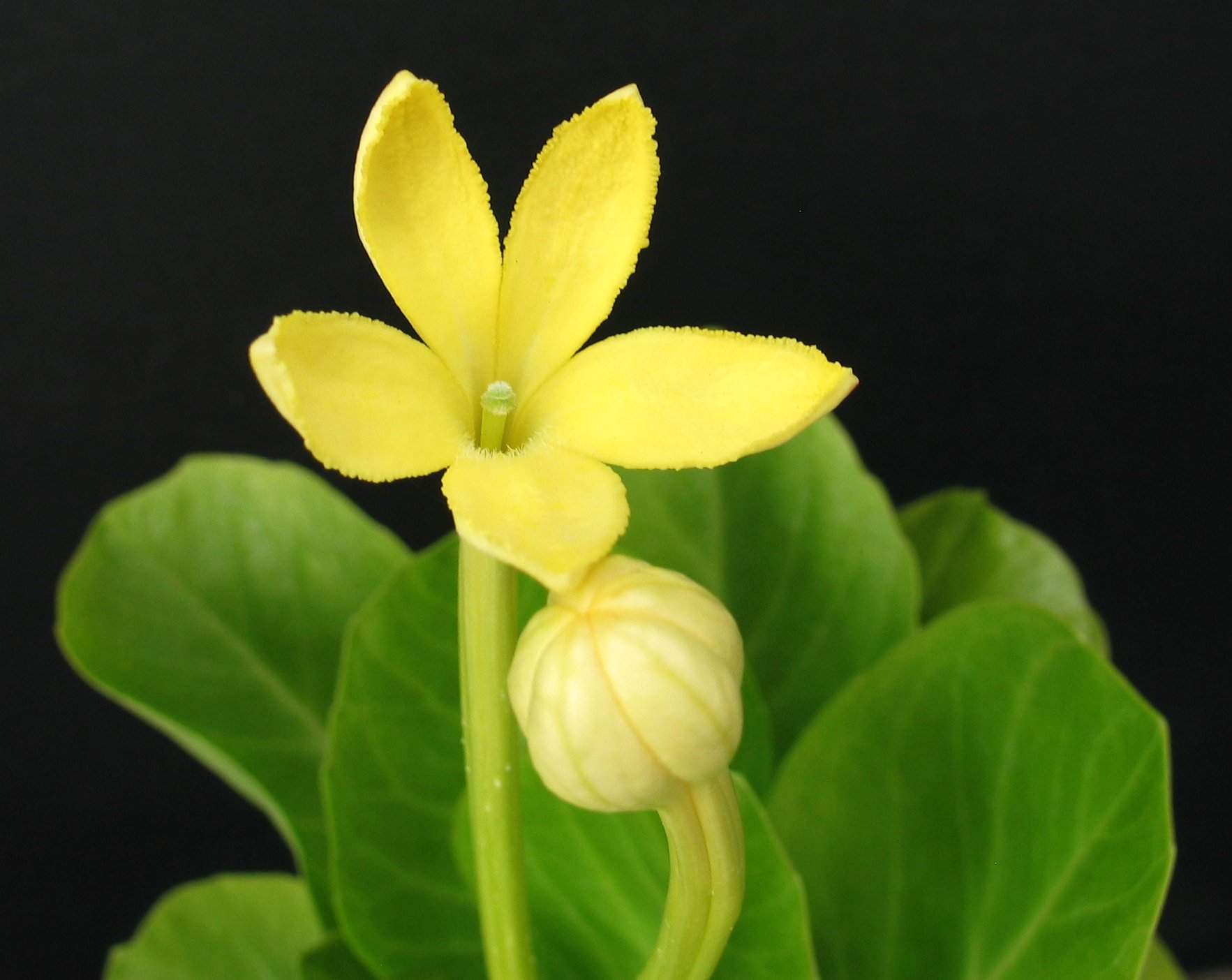
- Brighamia insignis flowers

Scientific classification
- Kingdom: Plantae
- Clade: Embryophytes
- Clade: Tracheophytes
- Clade: Spermatophytes
- Clade: Angiosperms
- Clade: Eudicots
- Clade: Asterids
- Order: Asterales
- Family: Campanulaceae
- Subfamily: Lobelioideae
- Genus: Brighamia

Type species
- Brighamia insignis A.Gray

Species
- See here
- It is endemic to Hawaii

= Brighamia =

Genus of bellflowers

Brighamia is a genus of plants in the family Campanulaceae endemic to Hawaii.

== Description ==
=== Vegetative characteristics ===
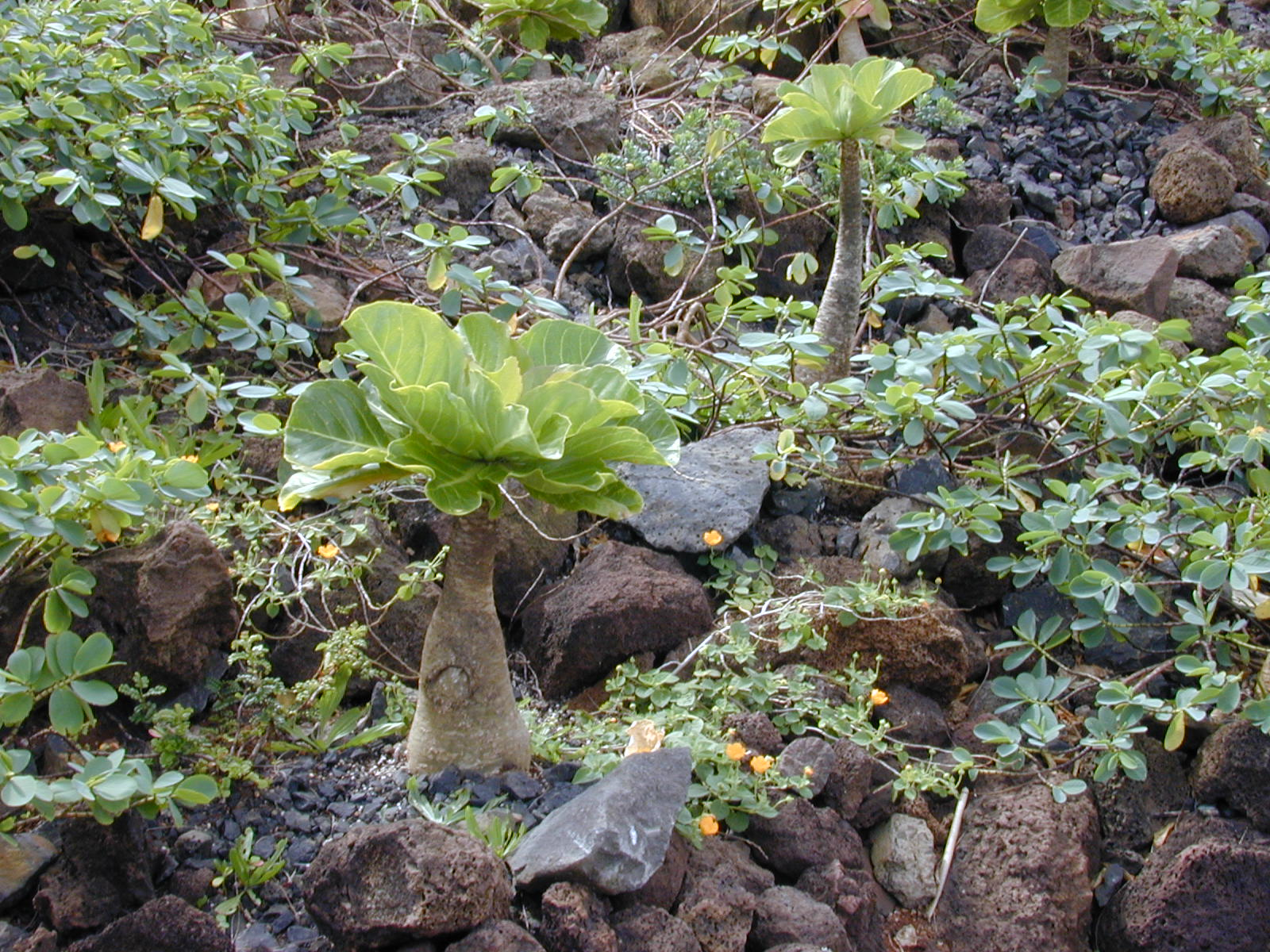
Brighamia insignis growing on Kauai, Hawaii

Brighamia are 1–2.5(–5) m tall, cremnophytic, halophytic, perennial, succulent, caudiciform plants with thick, mostly unbranched stems bearing numerous obovate, sessile or petiolate, nearly entire, rosette-like leaves at the apex of the stem. The stem and foliage produce latex.

=== Generative characteristics ===
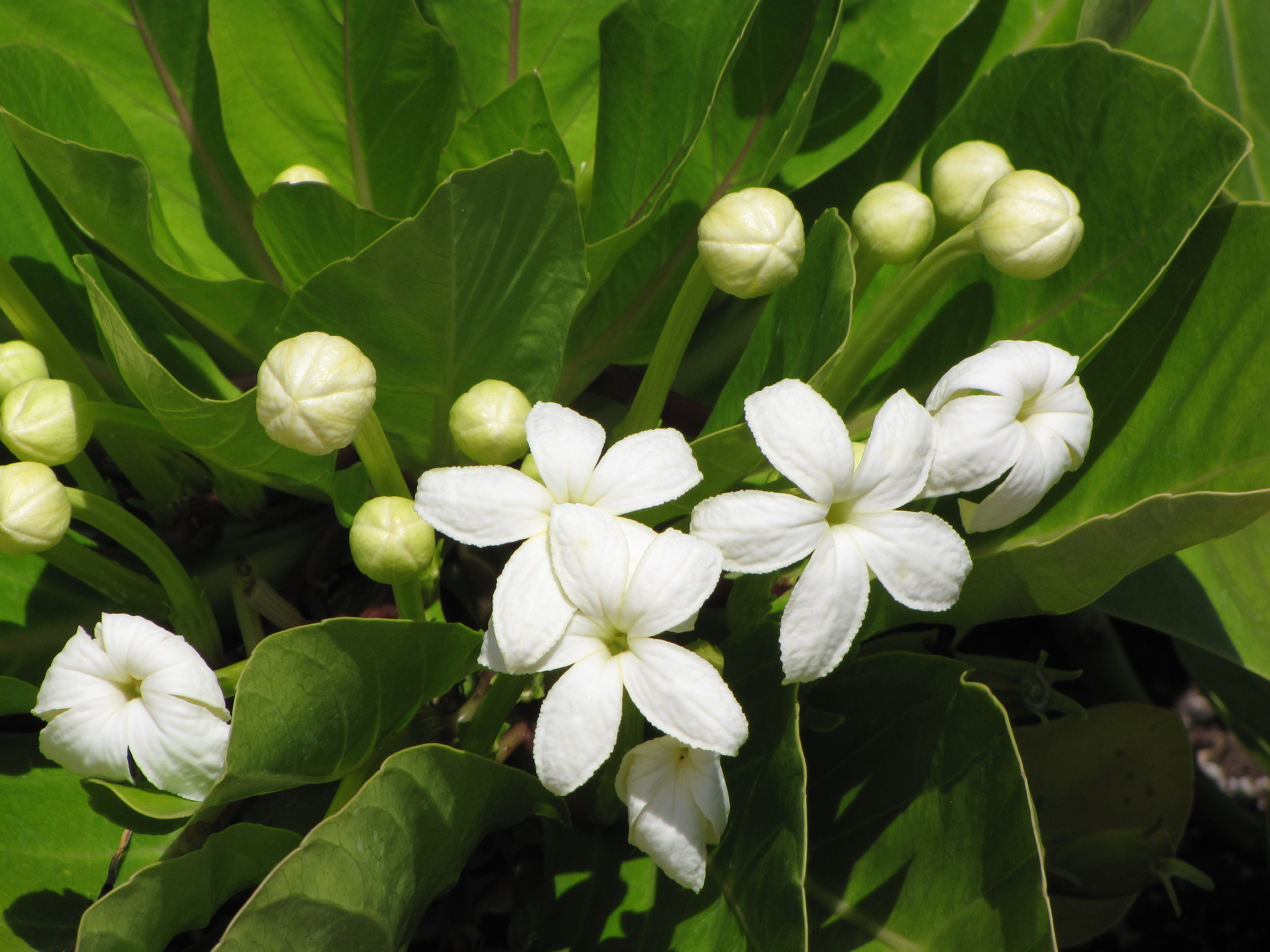
Flowering Brighamia rockii

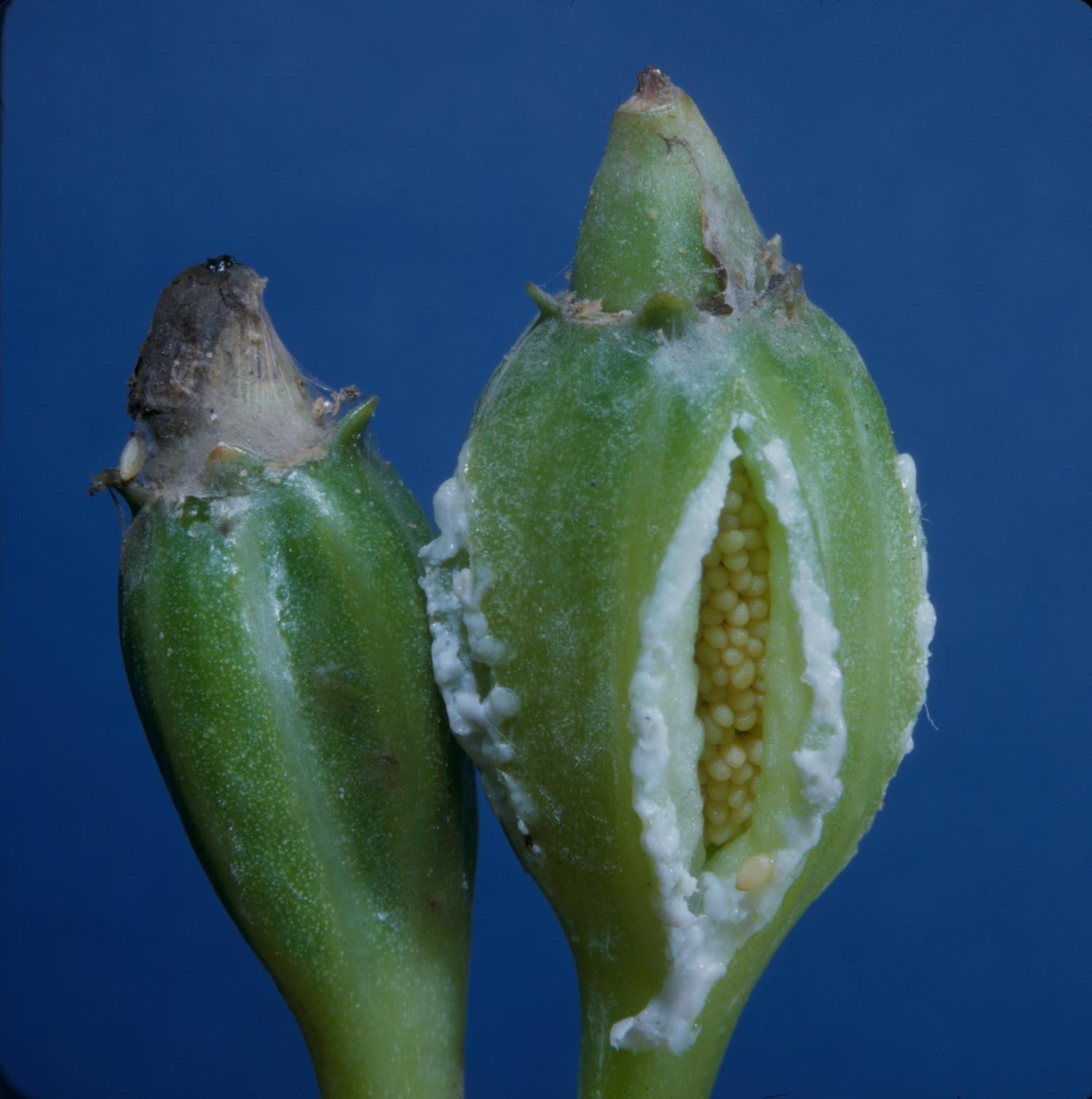
Brighamia insignis fruit

The axillary racemes bear white or yellow, fragrant, tubular, flowers.

== Taxonomy ==
It was described by Asa Gray in 1867 with Brighamia insignis A.Gray as the type species.

=== Species ===
The genus has two species:

- Brighamia insignis A.Gray
- Brighamia rockii H.St.John

== Distribution and habitat ==
The genus is endemic to Hawaii.

== Conservation ==
Brighamia species are threatened by extinction, as Brighamia rockii is Critically Endangered (CR) and Brighamia insignis is already Extinct in the Wild (EW). Both Brighamia rockii and Brighamia insignis are kept in ex-situ collections in botanic gardens. Brighamia insignis is also cultivated as a house plant. The Brighamia insignis in cultivation have only limited genetic diversity.
