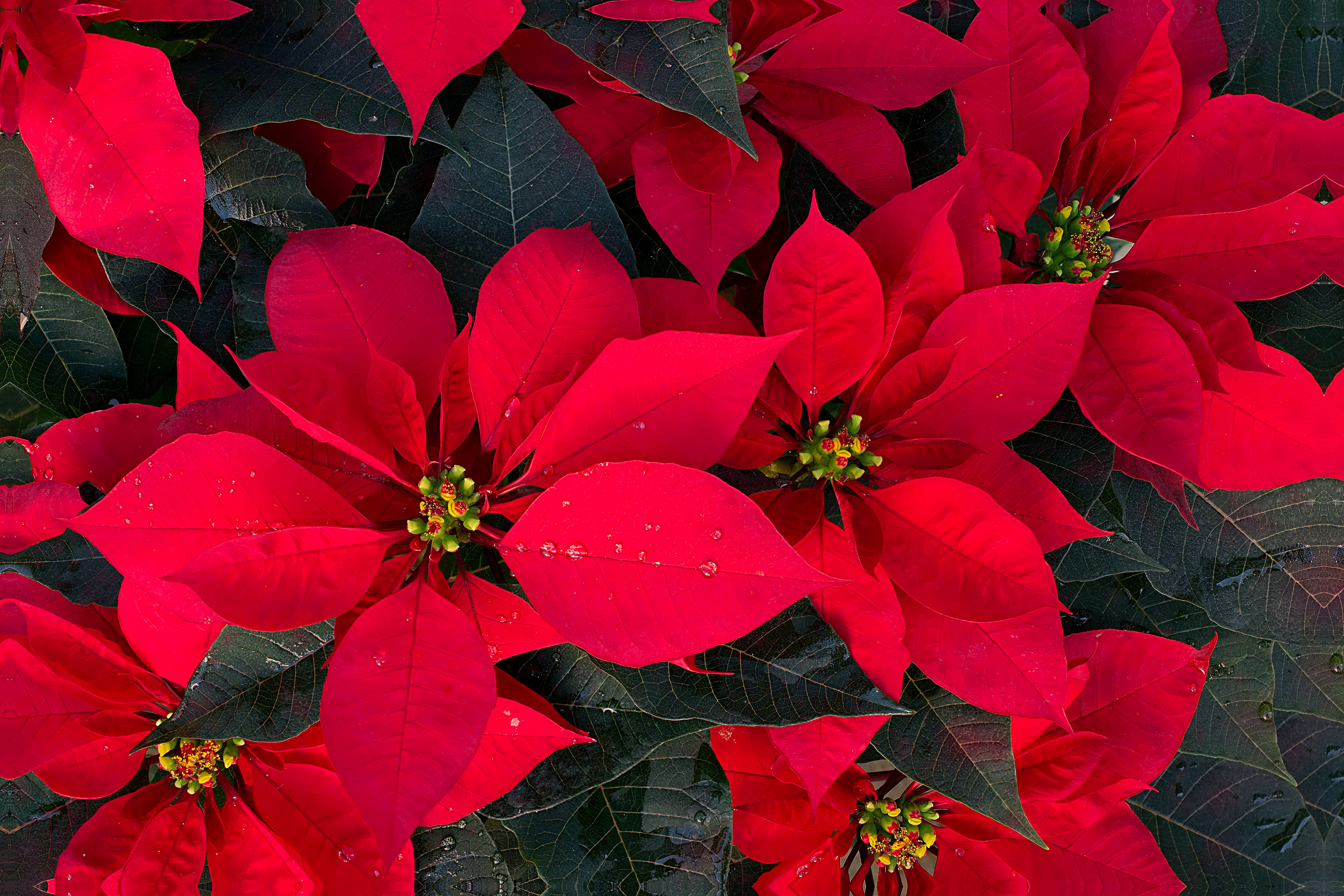
- E. pulcherrima (Poinsettia)

Scientific classification
- Kingdom: Plantae
- Clade: Tracheophytes
- Clade: Angiosperms
- Clade: Eudicots
- Clade: Rosids
- Order: Malpighiales
- Family: Euphorbiaceae
- Genus: Euphorbia
- Subgenus: Euphorbia subg. Chamaesyce
- Section: Euphorbia sect. Poinsettia (Graham) Baill.

Species
- About 24; see text.

Synonyms
- Poinsettia Graham; Euphorbia subg. Poinsettia (Graham) House

= Euphorbia sect. Poinsettia =

Subgenus of flowering plants

Euphorbia sect. Poinsettia a section of subgenus Chamaesyce of the genus Euphorbia endemic to North America. It contains around 24 species, most famously E. pulcherrima, the poinsettia, which grows wild in the mountains on the Pacific slope of Mexico. Despite many legends, no one knows from which wild population the cultivated varieties derive.

This taxon was first published at genus rank under the name Poinsettia by Robert Graham in 1836. It was demoted to a section of Euphorbia as E. sect. Poinsettia by Henri Ernest Baillon in 1858, but promoted to subgenus rank by Homer Doliver House in 1924. A 2007 study confirmed its monophyly, and it is now once again considered a section.

Its many species include:

- E. pulcherrima – (poinsettia)
- E. cyathophora – (summer poinsettia, wild poinsettia, painted leaf poinsettia)
- E. dentata – (green poinsettia)
- E. heterophylla – (desert poinsettia, wild poinsettia)
- E. pinetorum – (Everglades poinsettia)

The common name "wild poinsettia" is sometimes applied to two of these species.
