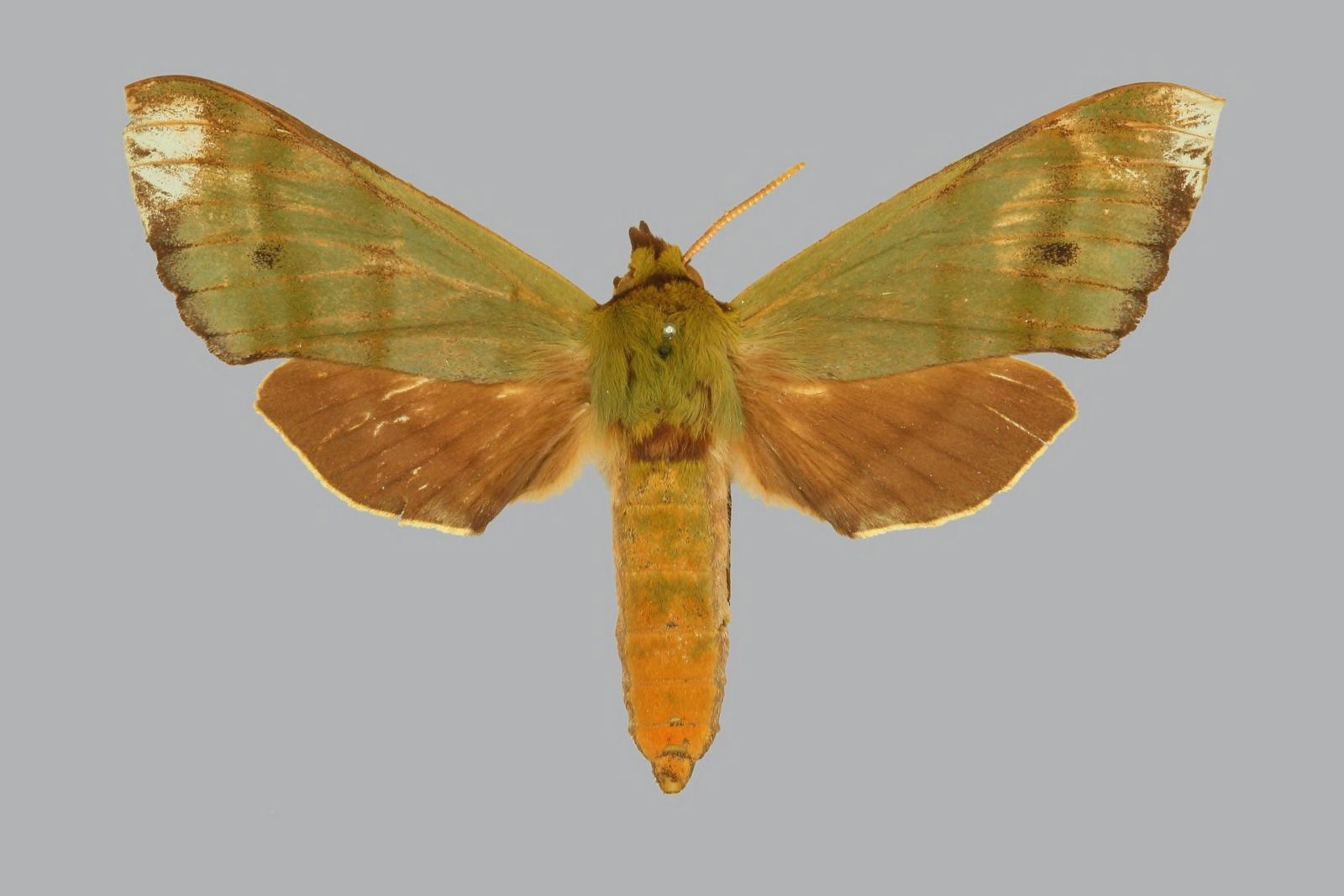
- Upperside of type specimen (male)

Conservation status
- Endangered (IUCN 3.1)

Scientific classification
- Kingdom: Animalia
- Phylum: Arthropoda
- Class: Insecta
- Order: Lepidoptera
- Family: Sphingidae
- Genus: Tinostoma; Rothschild & Jordan, 1903
- Species: T. smaragditis

Binomial name
- Tinostoma smaragditis (Meyrick, 1899)

Synonyms
- Deilephila smaragditis Meyrick, 1899

= Fabulous green sphinx moth =

Species of moth

The fabulous green sphinx moth or fabulous green sphinx of Kauai (Tinostoma smaragditis) is a species of moth in the family Sphingidae. It is monotypic within the genus Tinostoma. It is endemic to the Hawaiian Islands and was thought to be extinct until it was rediscovered in 1998. The genus was erected by Walter Rothschild and Karl Jordan in 1903 and the species was first described by Edward Meyrick in 1899.

Its natural habitats are dry and lowland moist forests. It is threatened by habitat loss.
