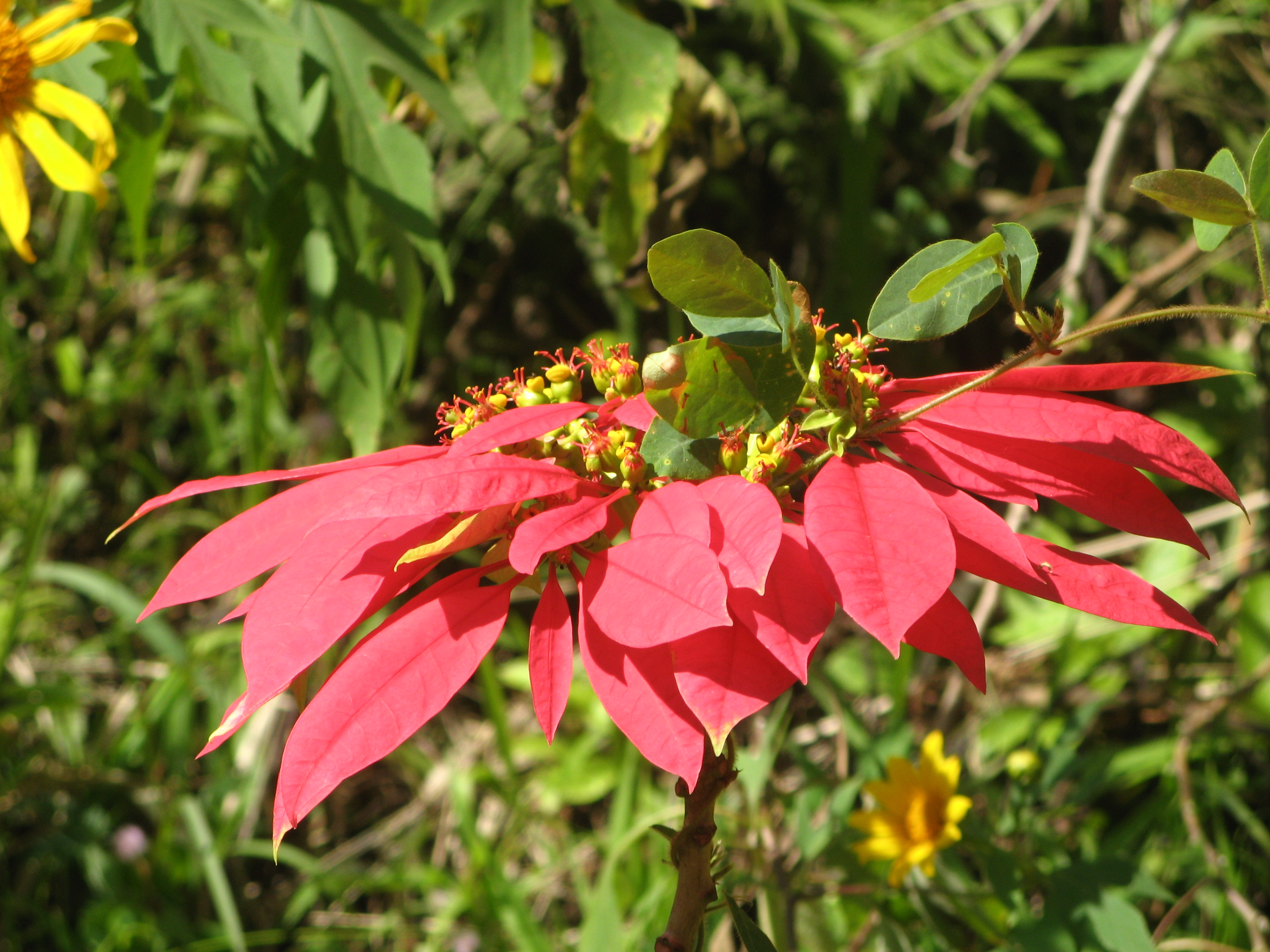
- Euphorbia pulcherrima, the poinsettia

Scientific classification
- Kingdom: Plantae
- Clade: Tracheophytes
- Clade: Angiosperms
- Clade: Eudicots
- Clade: Rosids
- Order: Malpighiales
- Family: Euphorbiaceae
- Genus: Euphorbia
- Subgenus: Euphorbia subg. Chamaesyce

Select sections
- E. sect. Anisophyllum; E. sect. Poinsettia

= Euphorbia subg. Chamaesyce =

Subgenus of plants

Euphorbia subg. Chamaesyce is one of four subgenera of the large and diverse genus of flowering plants, Euphorbia, or the spurges. The subgenus consists around 600 species including the poinsettia (in section Poinsettia) and the weedy sandmats of section Anisophyllum (formerly the genus Chamaesyce).
