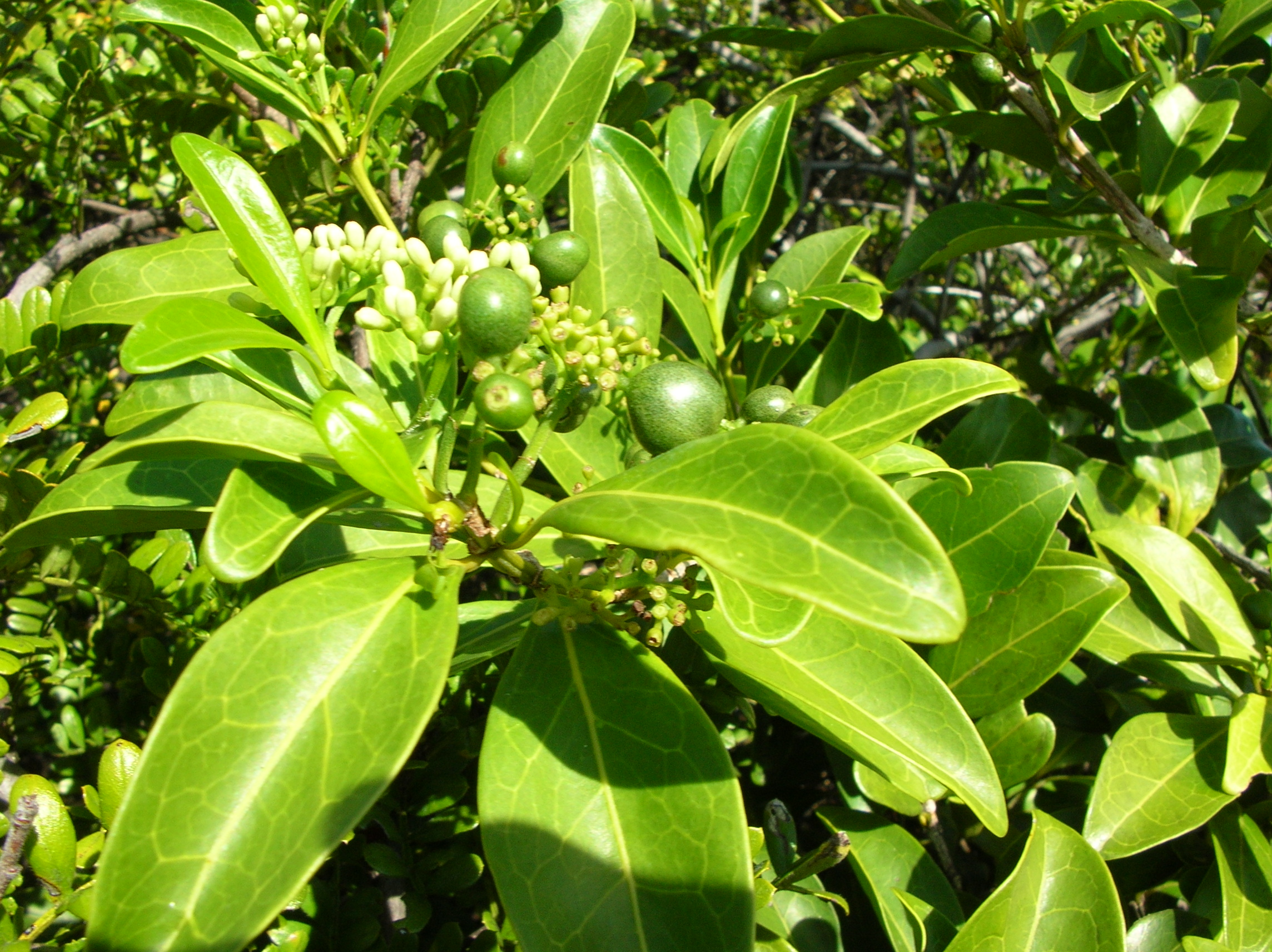

Scientific classification
- Kingdom: Plantae
- Clade: Embryophytes
- Clade: Tracheophytes
- Clade: Spermatophytes
- Clade: Angiosperms
- Clade: Eudicots
- Clade: Asterids
- Order: Gentianales
- Family: Rubiaceae
- Genus: Psydrax
- Species: P. odorata

Binomial name
- Psydrax odorata (G.Forst.) A.C.Sm. & S.P.Darwin

Synonyms
- Coffea odorata G.Forst.; Canthium odoratum (G.Forst.) Seem.; Ixora odorata (G.Forst.) Spreng.; Plectronia odorata (G.Forst.) F.Muell.

= Psydrax odorata =

Species of shrub

Psydrax odorata, known as alaheʻe in Hawaiian, is a species of flowering shrub or small tree in the coffee family, Rubiaceae. It is native to the Pacific Islands, New Guinea and Australia. The first name, Psydrax, is the definition for a blister or bump, while odoratus defines as a nice aroma.

== Description ==
The species range from 6–30 ft (1.8–9.1 m) in height, has a spread of 3–7 ft (0.91–2.13 m), and a trunk width of up to 4 in (10 cm). The leaves are glossy green in color, are up to 3.5 inches (89 mm) long and elliptic. The fruits of the plant are quite round, are black in color and 3/8 wide. They also have the capability to live for 5 years while being able to live in difficult environments such as: dry soil, little sunlight for photosynthesis and little to no fertilizer. The white flowers are bisexual. Meaning that the white flowers of Psydrax odorata have both male and female organs for reproductive. This aids in the survivability for offspring.

== Ecology ==
The fruits produce many seeds which are often attacked by the larvae of Alucita objurgatella, a species of the many-plumed moths.

== Habitat ==
The species can be found growing in dry shrub land and in dry to moist forests at elevations of up to 2,700 feet (800 m). This Psydrax Odorata plant is mainly found in the Hawaiian Islands. This species can be specifically seen on a hill called Kaluakauila in O'ahu. They are also found in the Big Island of Hawaii and Lanai.

== Uses ==
Native Hawaiians used the very hard wood of alaheʻe to make koʻi alaheʻe (adzes for cutting softer woods such as Erythrina sandwicensis), ʻōʻō (digging sticks), and ʻo (short spears). A black dye was made from the leaves. Natural medicine for the sick was used from the stem and leaves. Some people used leaves (as well as other ingredients) to disinfect bloody fluids of the body. The leaves were specifically used because Pacific Islanders and Indigenous Australian trusted its properties to take effect on severe and non-severe injuries.

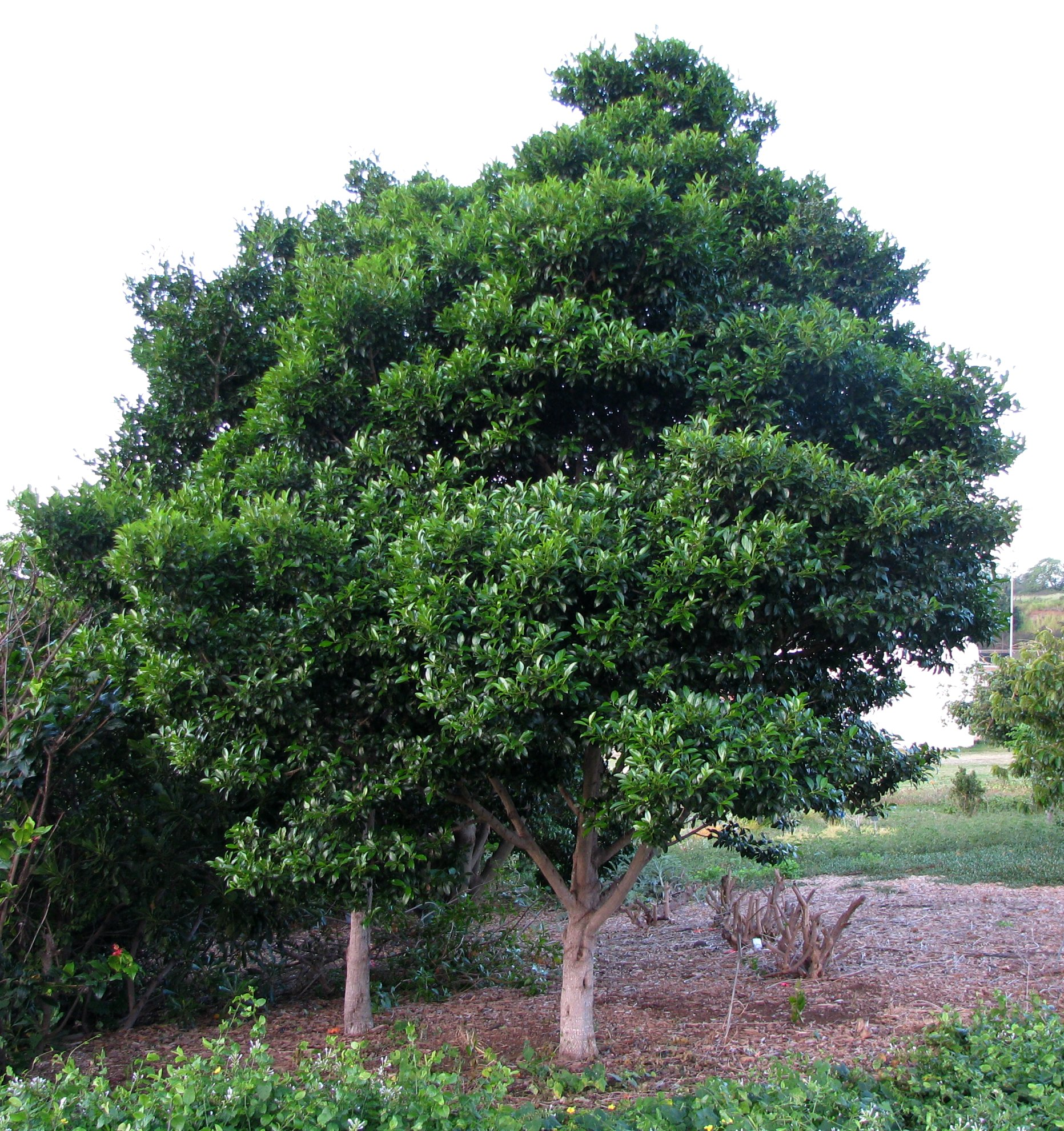
The whole tree of Psydrax odorata.
