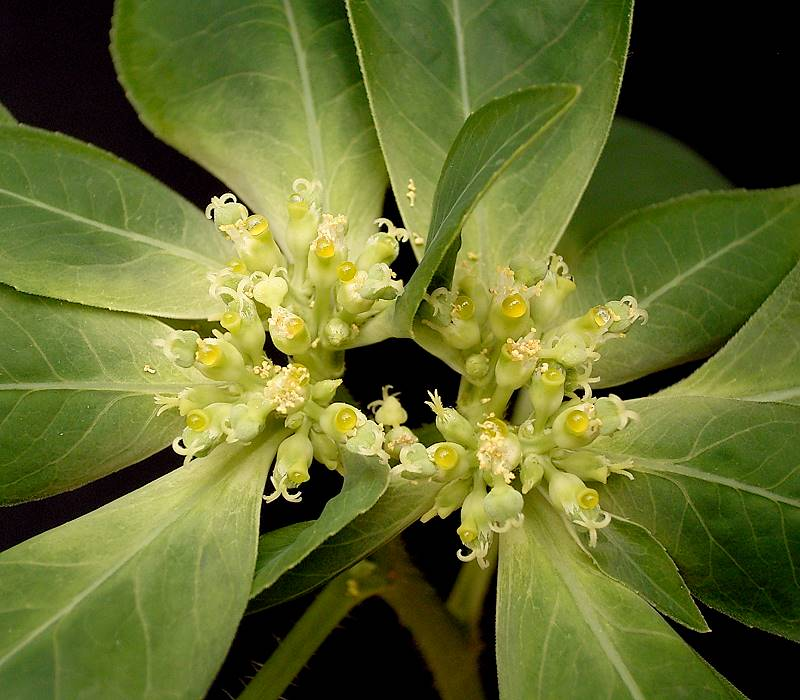

Scientific classification
- Kingdom: Plantae
- Clade: Tracheophytes
- Clade: Angiosperms
- Clade: Eudicots
- Clade: Rosids
- Order: Malpighiales
- Family: Euphorbiaceae
- Genus: Euphorbia
- Species: E. dentata

Binomial name
- Euphorbia dentata Michx.

= Euphorbia dentata =

Species of flowering plant

Euphorbia dentata is a species of spurge known by the common names toothed spurge and green poinsettia. It is native to parts of North and South America, and is present elsewhere on the continents. Its true native range is uncertain. It is a noxious weed in some areas. This is a hairy annual herb with an erect or somewhat erect stem reaching anywhere from 20 to 50 centimeters tall. Its hairy, pointed leaves are a few centimeters long, widely to narrowly lance-shaped, and generally toothed. The inflorescence appears at the end of branches and contain cream or yellowish staminate or pistillate flowers just a few millimeters wide. The fruit is a lobed spherical or heart-shaped capsule about half a centimeter wide which contains three bumpy rounded seeds.
