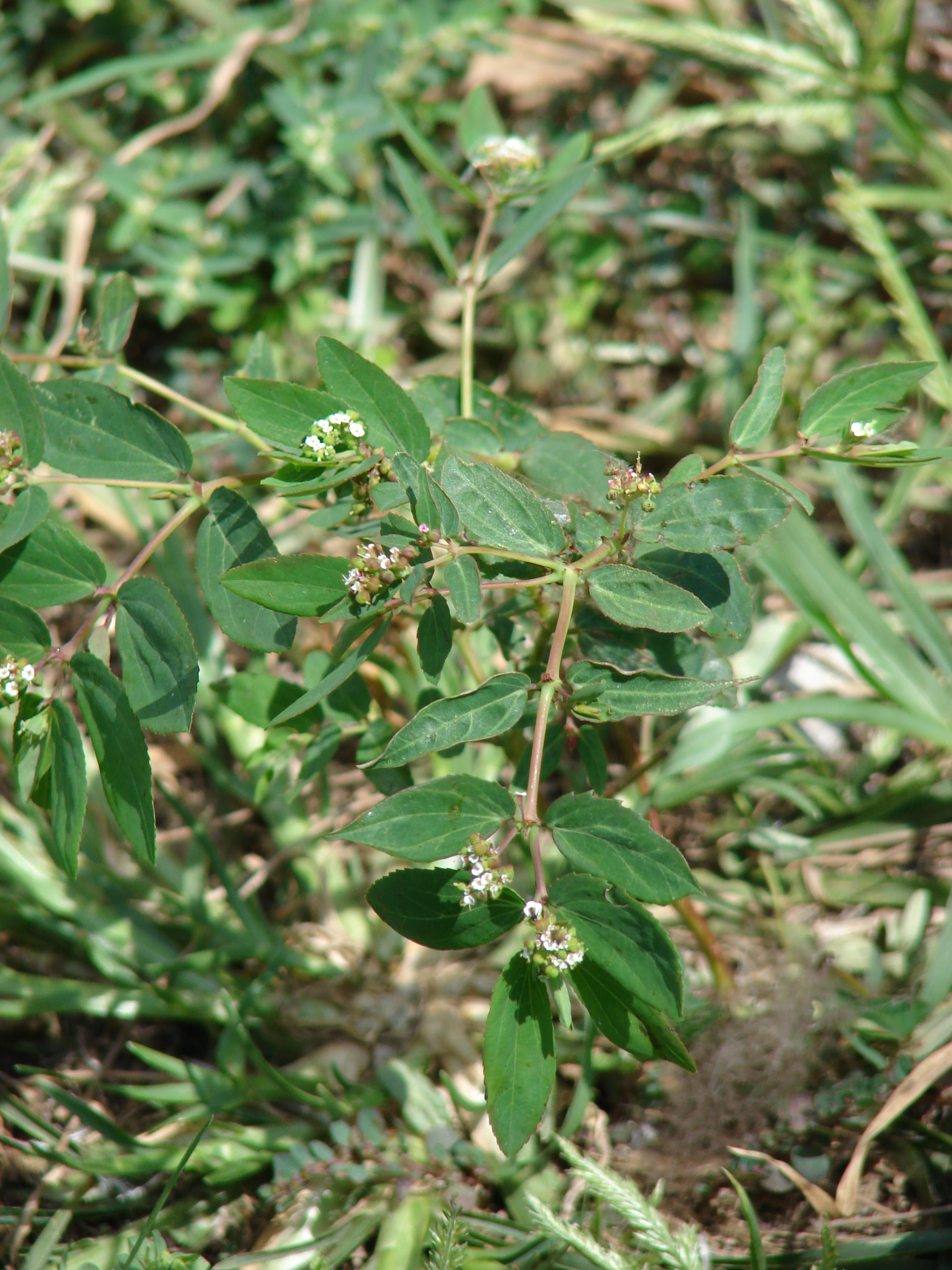
- Euphorbia hypericifolia leaves and flowers

Scientific classification
- Kingdom: Plantae
- Clade: Tracheophytes
- Clade: Angiosperms
- Clade: Eudicots
- Clade: Rosids
- Order: Malpighiales
- Family: Euphorbiaceae
- Genus: Euphorbia
- Subgenus: Euphorbia subg. Chamaesyce
- Section: Euphorbia sect. Anisophyllum

= Chamaesyce =

Euphorbia sect. Anisophyllum

Genus of flowering plants

Chamaesyce is former genus of plants in the family Euphorbiaceae, now subsumed into the genus Euphorbia as Euphorbia sect. Anisophyllum in the subgenus Chamaesyce. The section contains around 350–365 species (around 210 New World and 140 Old World) that were formerly in the genus Chamaesyce. Plants in this section are known for their prostrate, branching habit and include probably best known for E. maculata, a temperate weed known as spotted spurge found worldwide, and E. hirta, a pantropical weed. Many of the species are known as sandmats. The section Anisophyllum is very closely related to plants like Euphorbia pulcherrima, the popular poinsettia.

Euphorbia sect. Anisophyllum differs from other Euphorbia species in a number of characteristics. Perhaps the most important is the presence of C4 photosynthesis in all but one subsection (subsection Acutae, which represents a basal clade that is made up of species with intermediate C2 photosynthetic pathways). Other characteristics include sympodial branching, dorsi-ventral stems, asymmetric leaves, non-glandular stipules, and ecarunculate seeds.

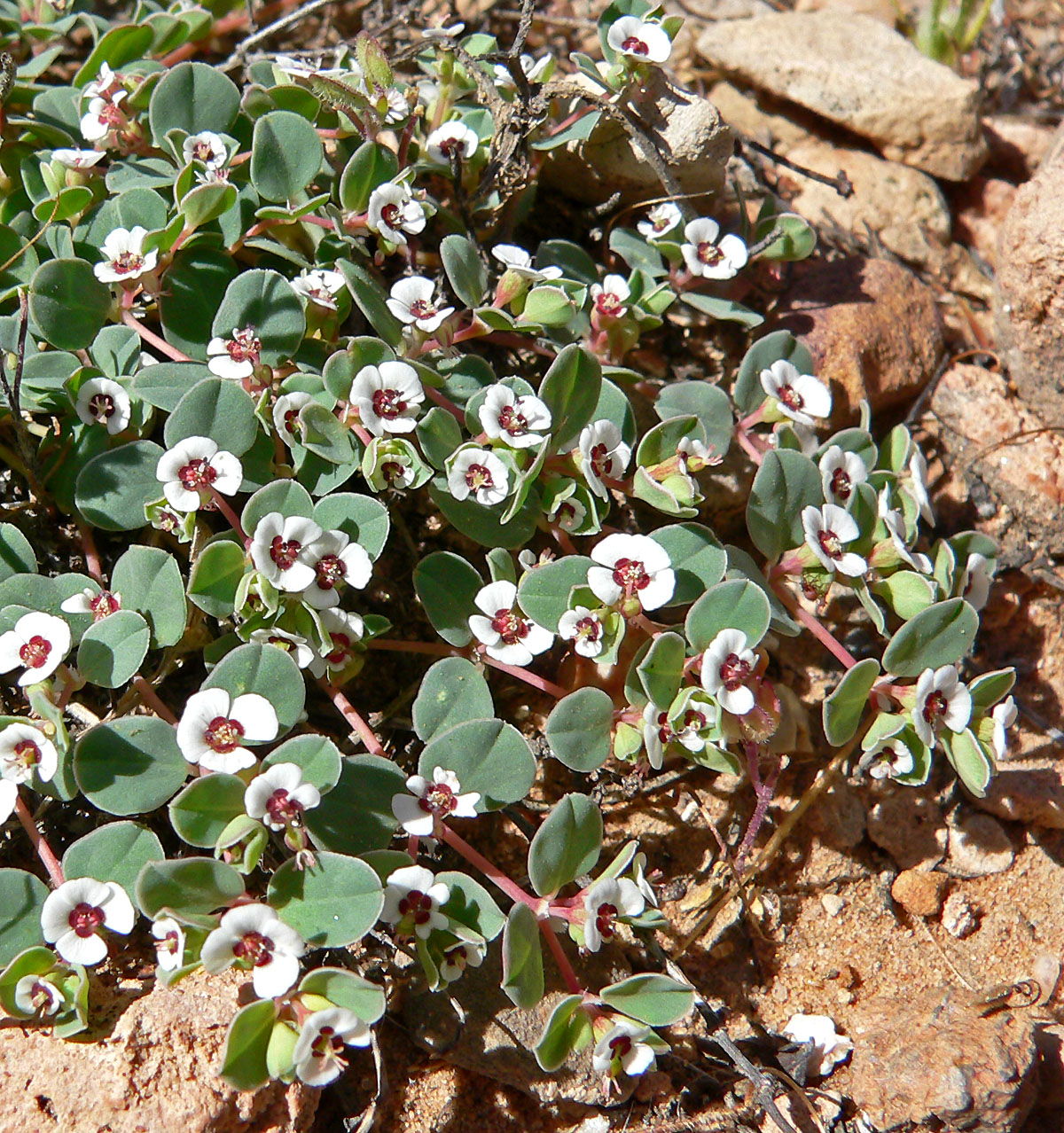
Euphorbia albomarginata, the whitemargin sandmat, is a species with showy bracts, an adaptation to a semiarid region with competition for pollinators.

Plants in the section (as with all other species in the genus Euphorbia) bear tiny flowering structures that look like single true flowers, as if each one were a flower with many stamens surrounding a single ovary. In fact, the structure is a cyathium (sometimes called a pseudanthium, meaning a "false flower"). It is made up of many small flowers, but with each flower reduced to only the functional organs of sexual reproduction: a single stamen or a single pistil without petals or sepals. Under magnification it can be seen that what appear to be many stamens plus the gynoecium of a single flower, actually form an inflorescence surrounded with many staminate flowers surrounding a single pistillate flower. Each individual staminate flower contributes only a single stamen and retaining no other structure apart from a vestigial stalk below the base of the stamen's filament. That stalk joins the capitulum or base of the inflorescence — the flowering head. Similarly, what appears to be the flower's ovary is the gynoecium of a single pistillate flower that has lost all the other associated organs of a flower. What appear to be the petals of an individual flower are in fact appendages produced by glands that are produced by bracts (collectively called the involucre), adapted leaves attached below the cyathium. These bracts are fused into a cup-like structure. In some species, such as Euphorbia albomarginata, the glandular appendages are quite showy.

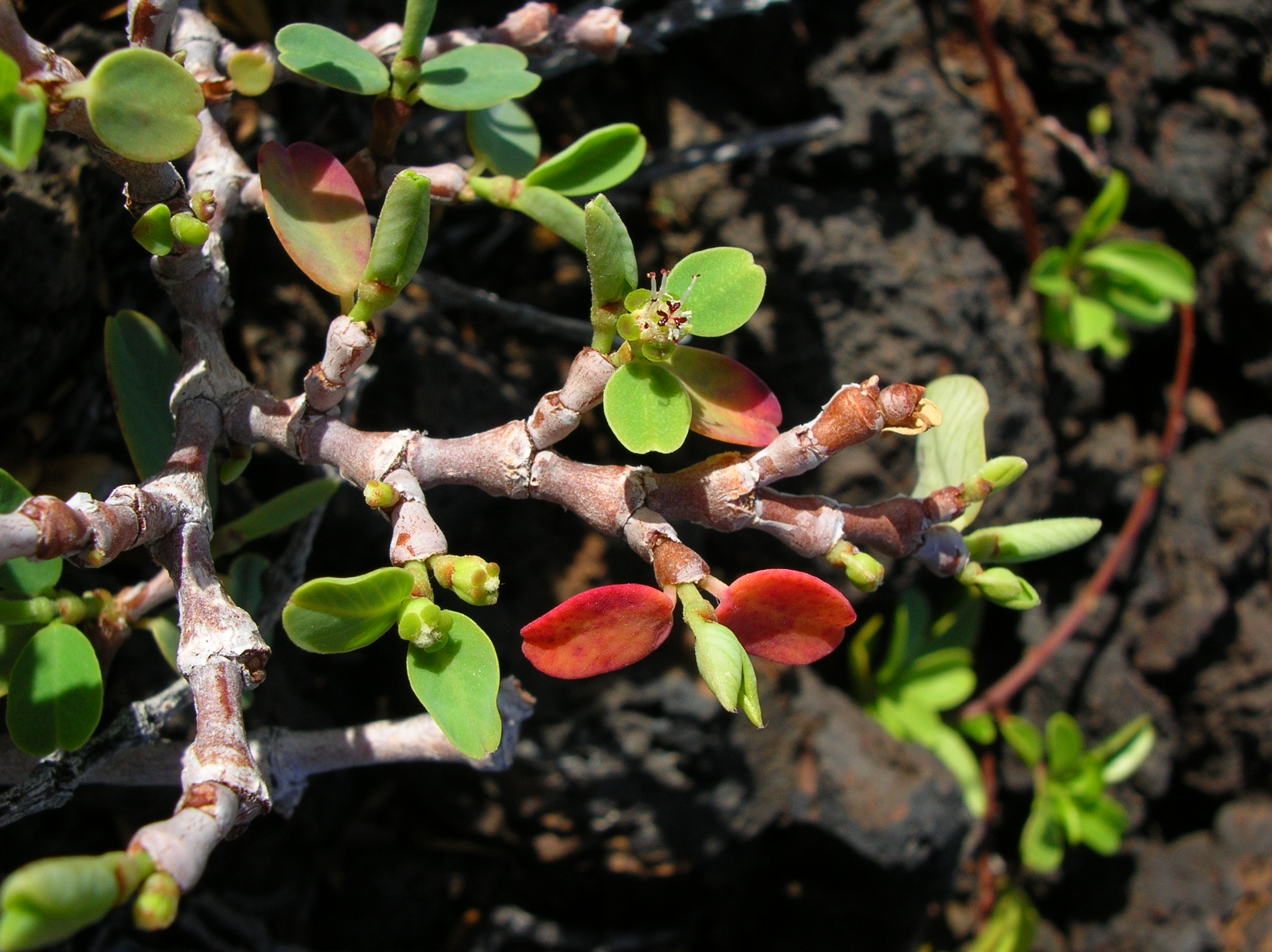
Cyathium of flowering Euphorbia celastroides

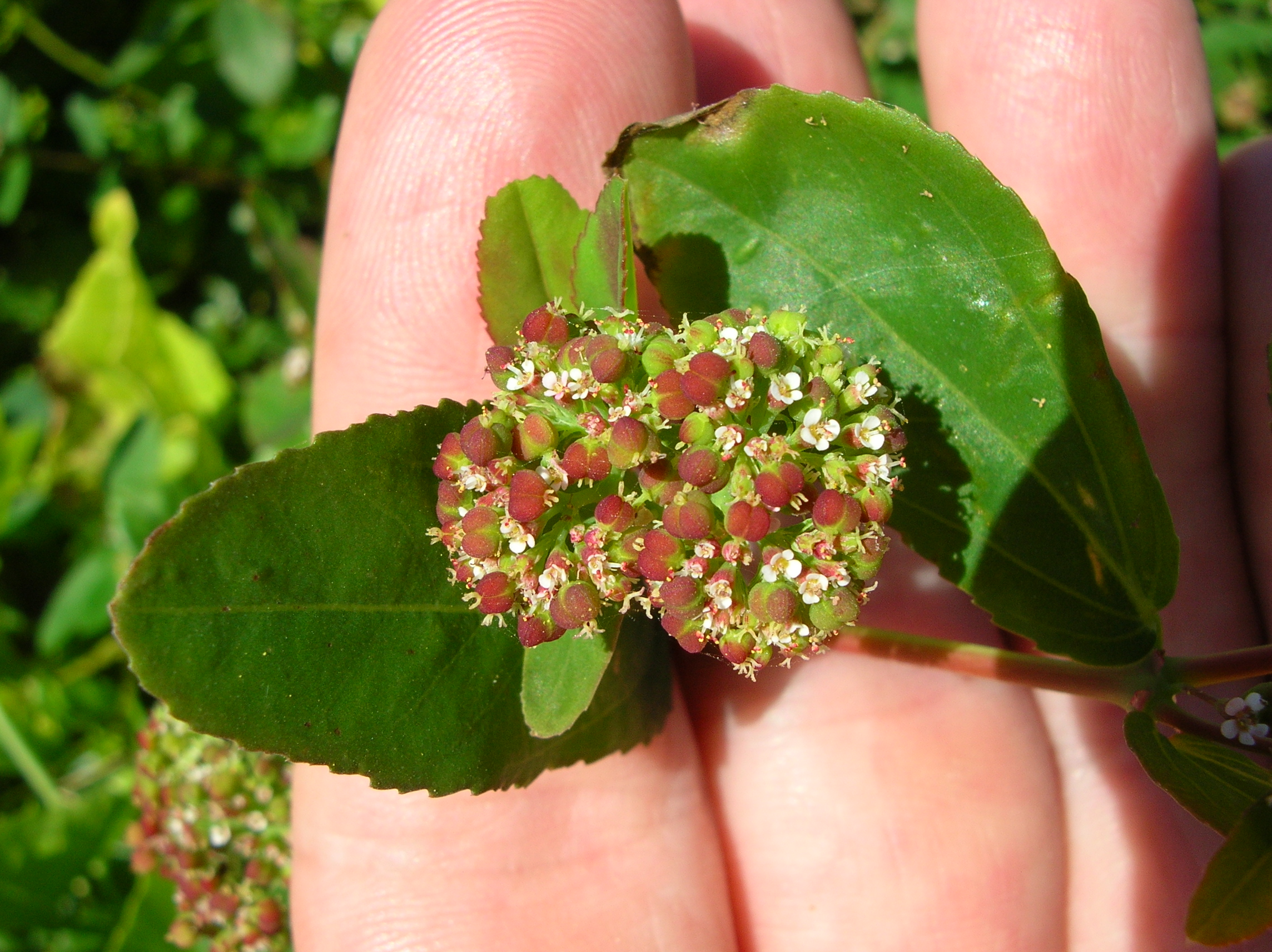
Euphorbia hypericifolia flowers and young fruit

–
