= Allerton Park =

Allerton Park may refer to:

- Allerton Castle, a Gothic House in North Yorkshire, England
- Allerton Garden, a nature preserve and museum on the island of Kauaʻi, Hawaiʻi
- Robert Allerton Park, a large nature preserve and public area near Monticello, Illinois
