= Kahanu Garden =

Botanical garden and nature preserve in Hana, Maui, Hawaii, United States

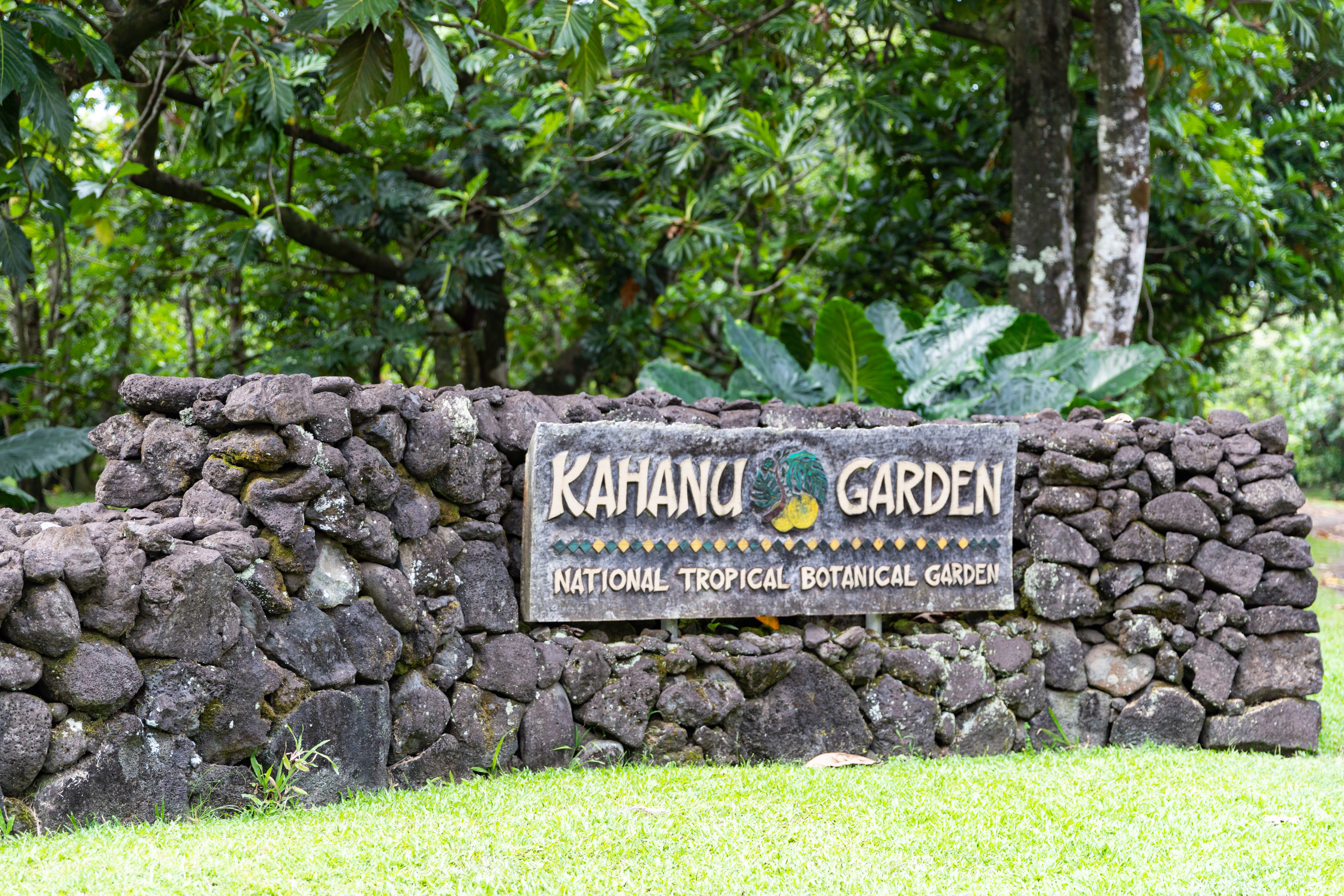
- Interactive map of Kahanu Garden

Kahanu Garden and Preserve is a botanical garden located on the Hana Highway (close to the 31-mile or 50-kilometre marker) near Hana, Maui, Hawaii. It is one of five gardens of the non-profit National Tropical Botanical Garden, the others being McBryde, Allerton, and Limahuli Garden and Preserve on Kauaʻi, and The Kampong in Florida.

The garden was established in 1972 on Maui's northern coast, with rugged black lava seascapes, and is surrounded by one of Hawaiʻi's last undisturbed hala (Pandanus tectorius) forests.

The garden's ethnobotanical collections focus on plants traditionally used by Pacific Island people. It includes the world's largest breadfruit collection, first established in the 1970s. Today the garden contains accessions of approximately 150 varieties of breadfruit collected from field expeditions to over 17 Pacific island groups in Polynesia, Micronesia, and Melanesia, as well as Indonesia, the Philippines, and the Seychelles. This collection is used for research and conservation by NTBG's Breadfruit Institute.

Other garden holdings include bamboo, banana, calabash, coconut, kava, kamani (Calophyllum inophyllum), loʻulu (Pritchardia arecina), sugarcane, taro, turmeric, vanilla, and bitter yam (Dioscorea bulbifera).

Kahanu Garden is open to visitors. An admission fee is charged.

== Piʻilanihale Heiau ==
- Piʻilanihale Heiau
- U.S. National Register of Historic Places
- U.S. National Historic Landmark
- Hawaiʻi Register of Historic Places
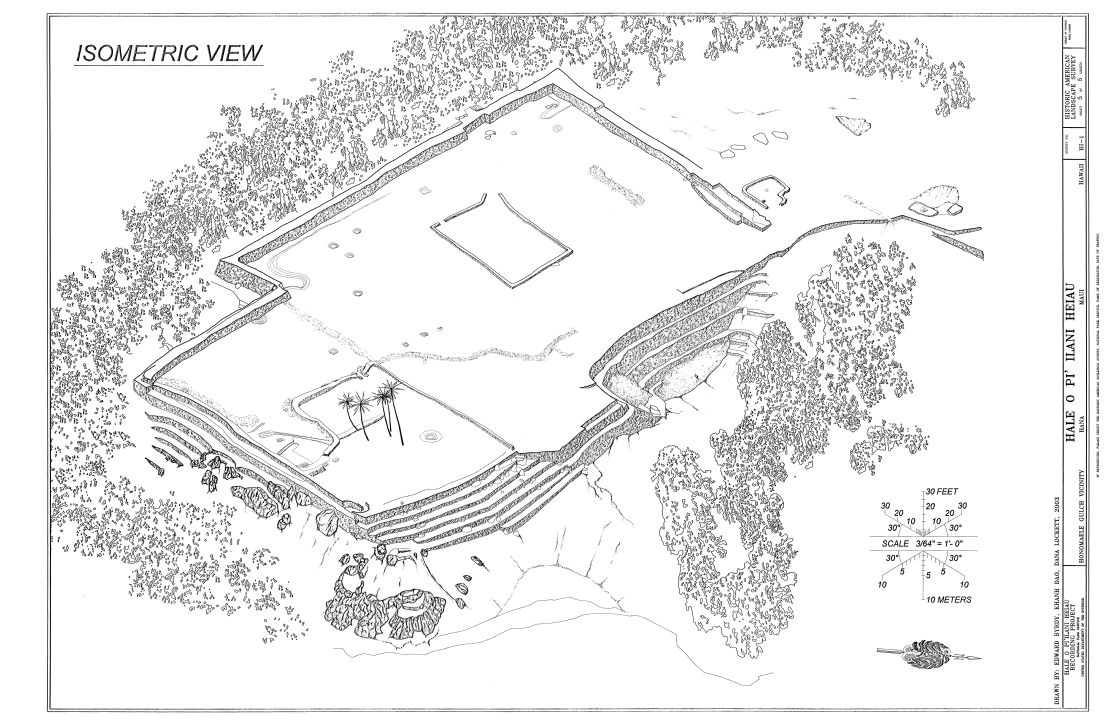
- Sketch of the heiau

- Location within Hawaii
- Nearest city: Hāna, Hawaiʻi
- Coordinates: 20°47′57″N 156°2′18″W
- Area: 3 acres (12,000 m^{2})
- NRHP reference No.: 66000300
- HRHP No.: 50-50-13-00100

Significant dates
- Added to NRHP: October 15, 1966
- Designated NHL: January 29, 1964
- Designated HRHP: October 15, 1966

Kahanu Garden also contains the 3-acre (12,000 m^{2}) Piʻilanihale Heiau, a National Historic Landmark believed to be the largest heiau in the Hawaiian Islands. It is built from basalt blocks and extends 341 feet (104 m) by 415 feet (126 m), with a high front wall rising 50 feet (15 m). The large central terrace with two separate platforms is situated on a broad ridge that adds to its majesty. The side facing the sea rises steeply in five stepped terraces, and the upper rectangular surface of the main platform contains several smaller walled enclosures and pits, all bounded on the rear by a well-built stone wall up to 8 feet (2.4 m) high.

Construction of the main terrace dates back to the 14th century. Wings were later added and rededicated during the 16th century, possibly after high chief Piʻilani from western Maui conquered the beautiful, fertile, well-watered, and heavily populated Hāna region, thereby unifying the whole island.

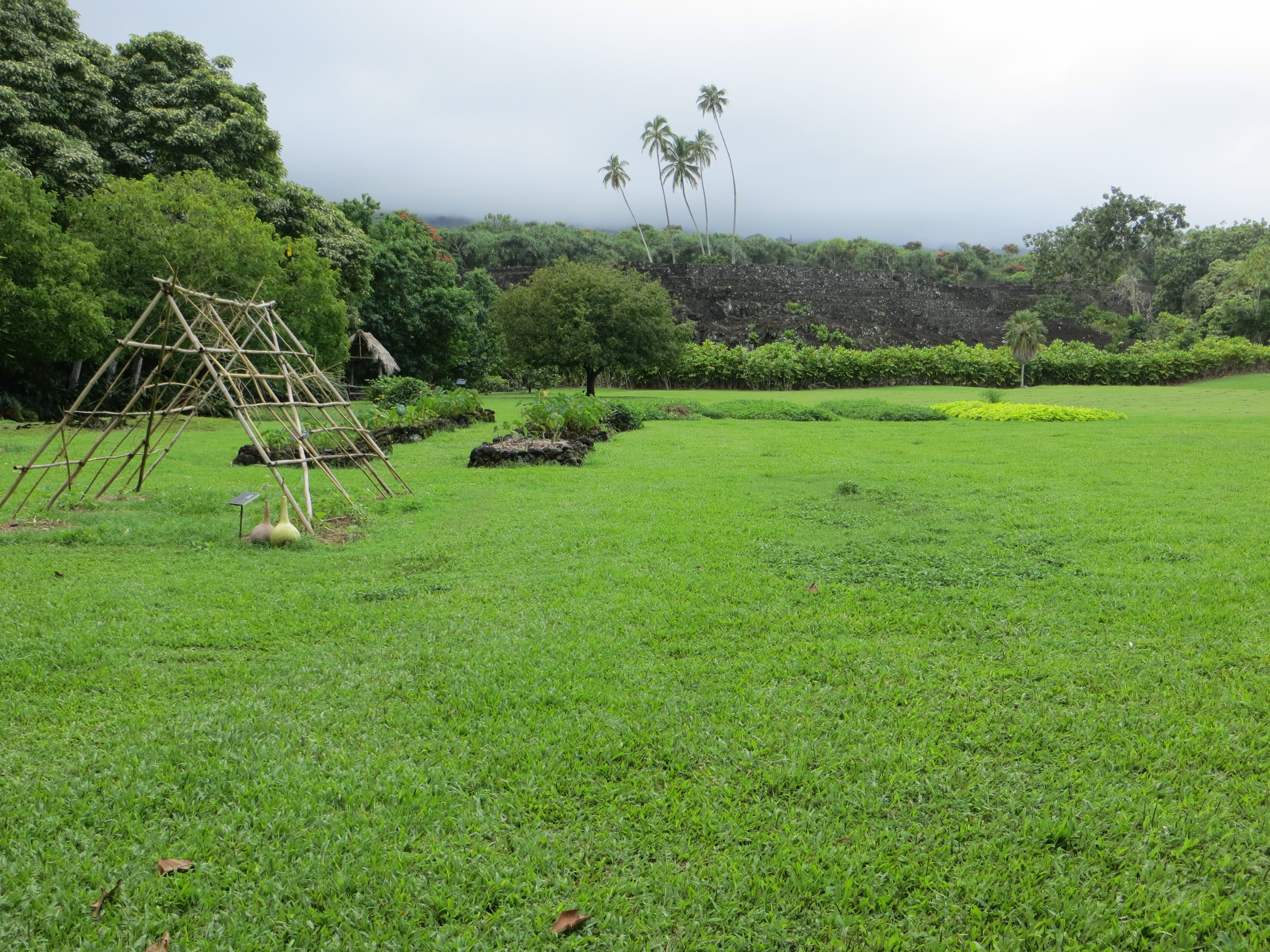
gardens below heiau

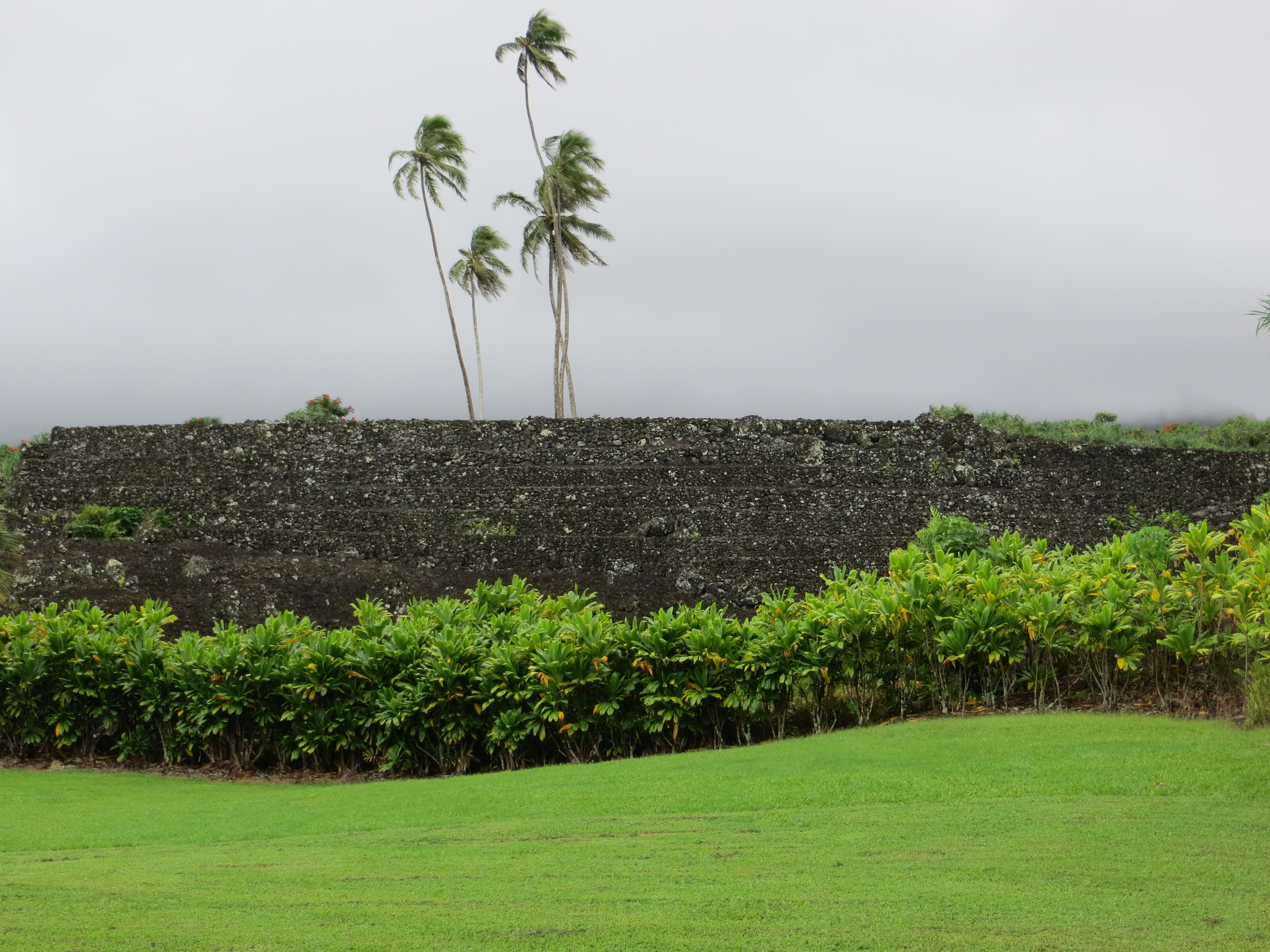
ocean side of heiau wall

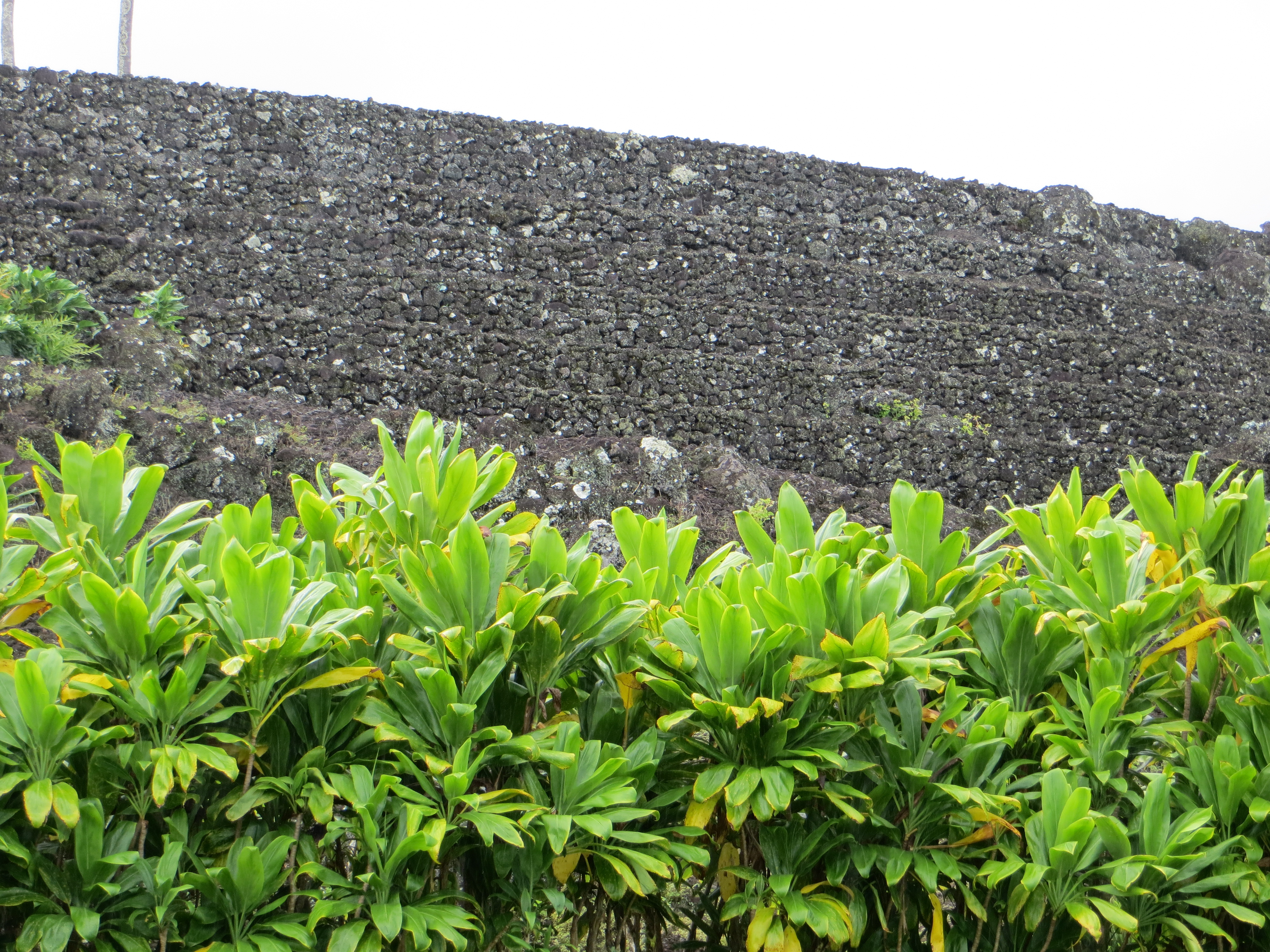
closer view of heiau wall

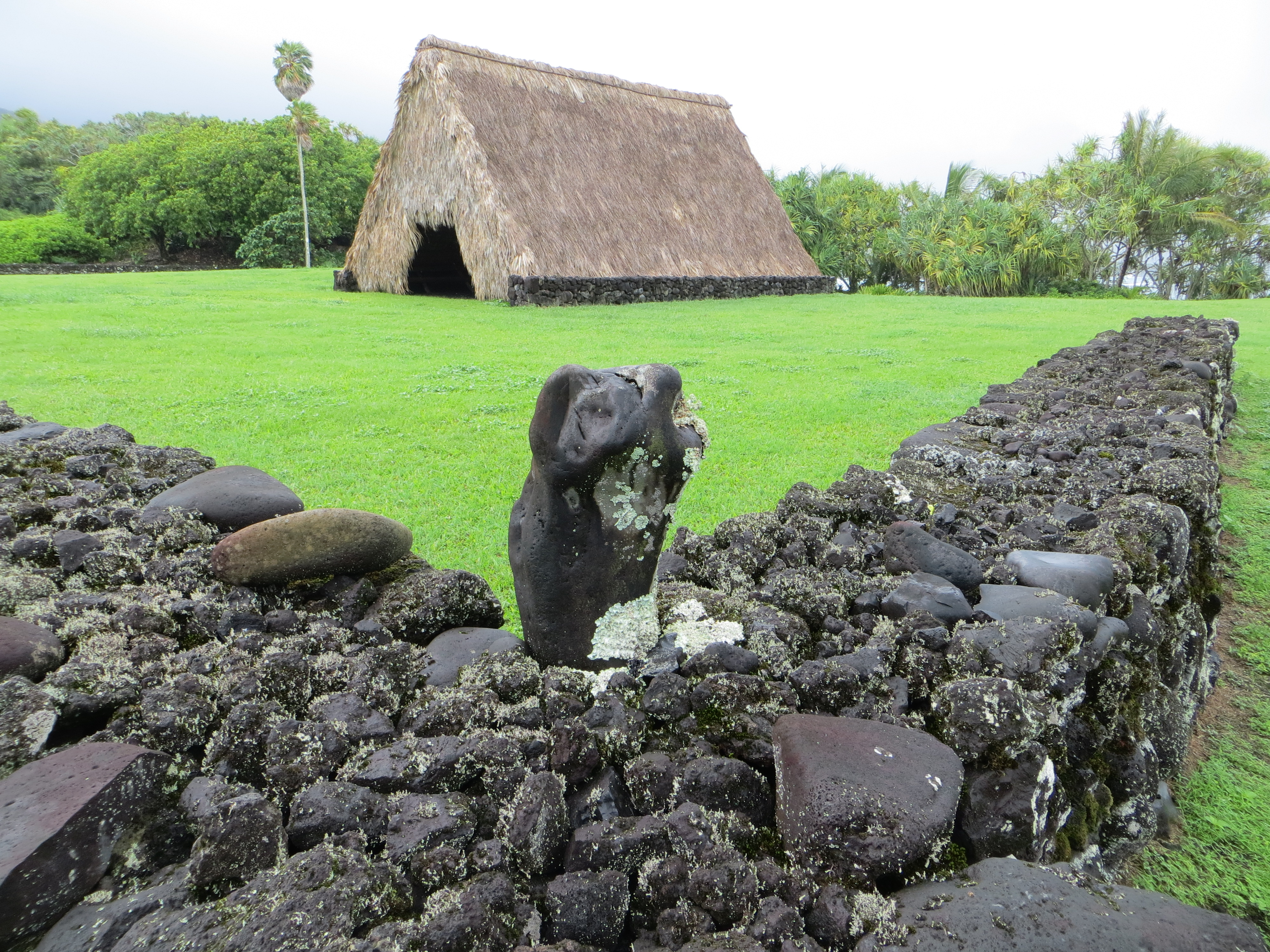
canoe house enclosure

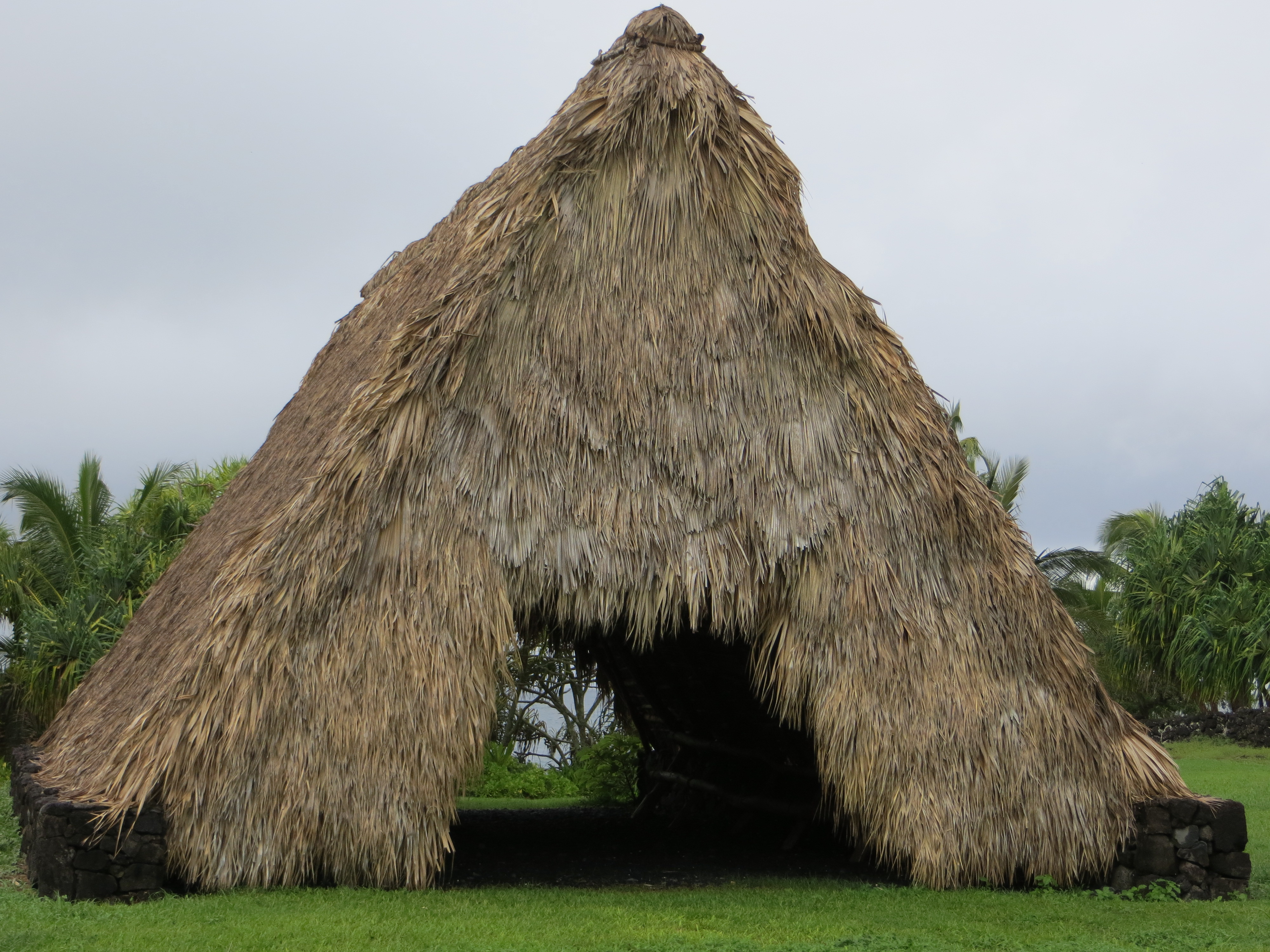
thatched canoe house

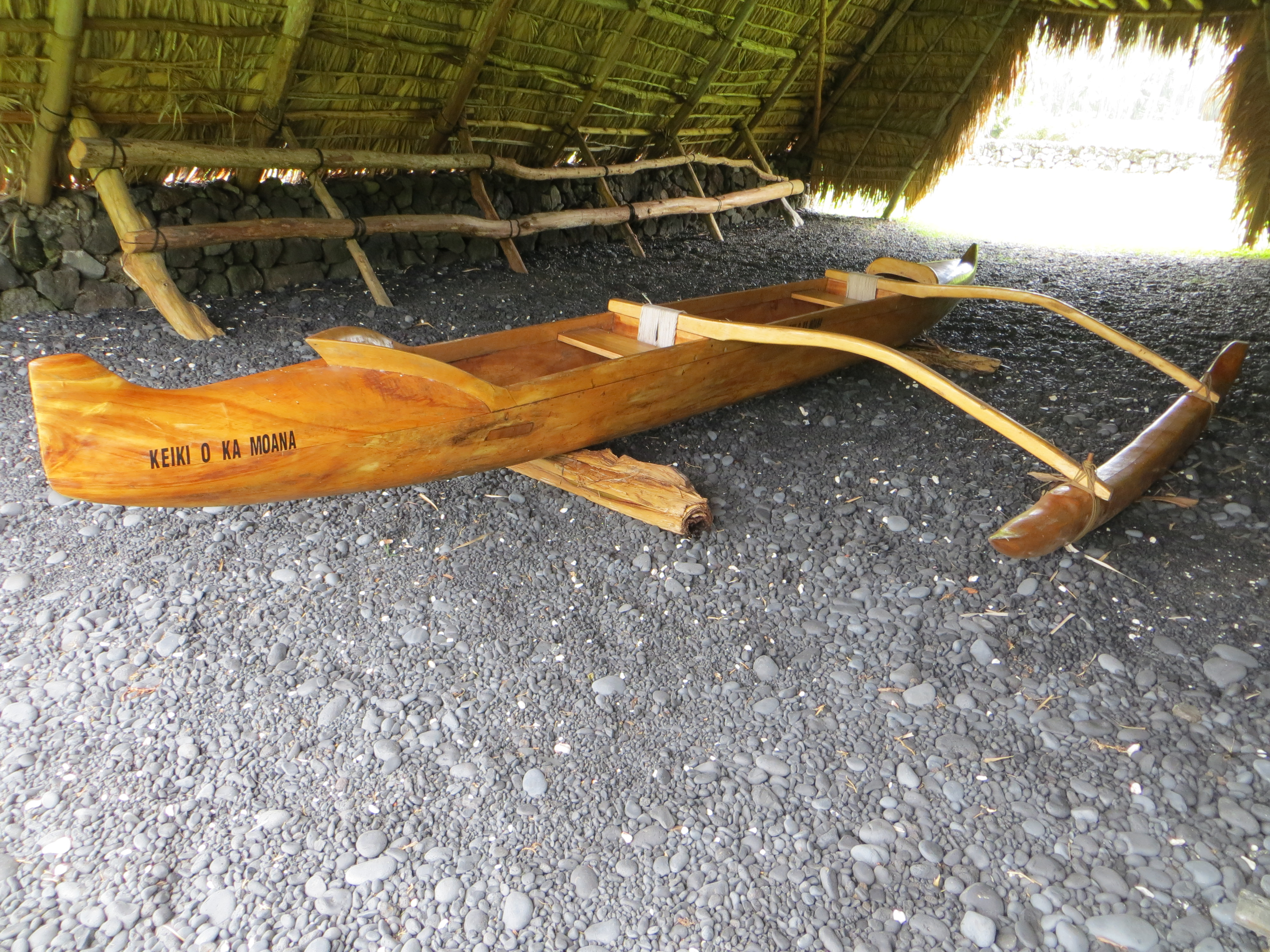
outrigger canoe in canoe house

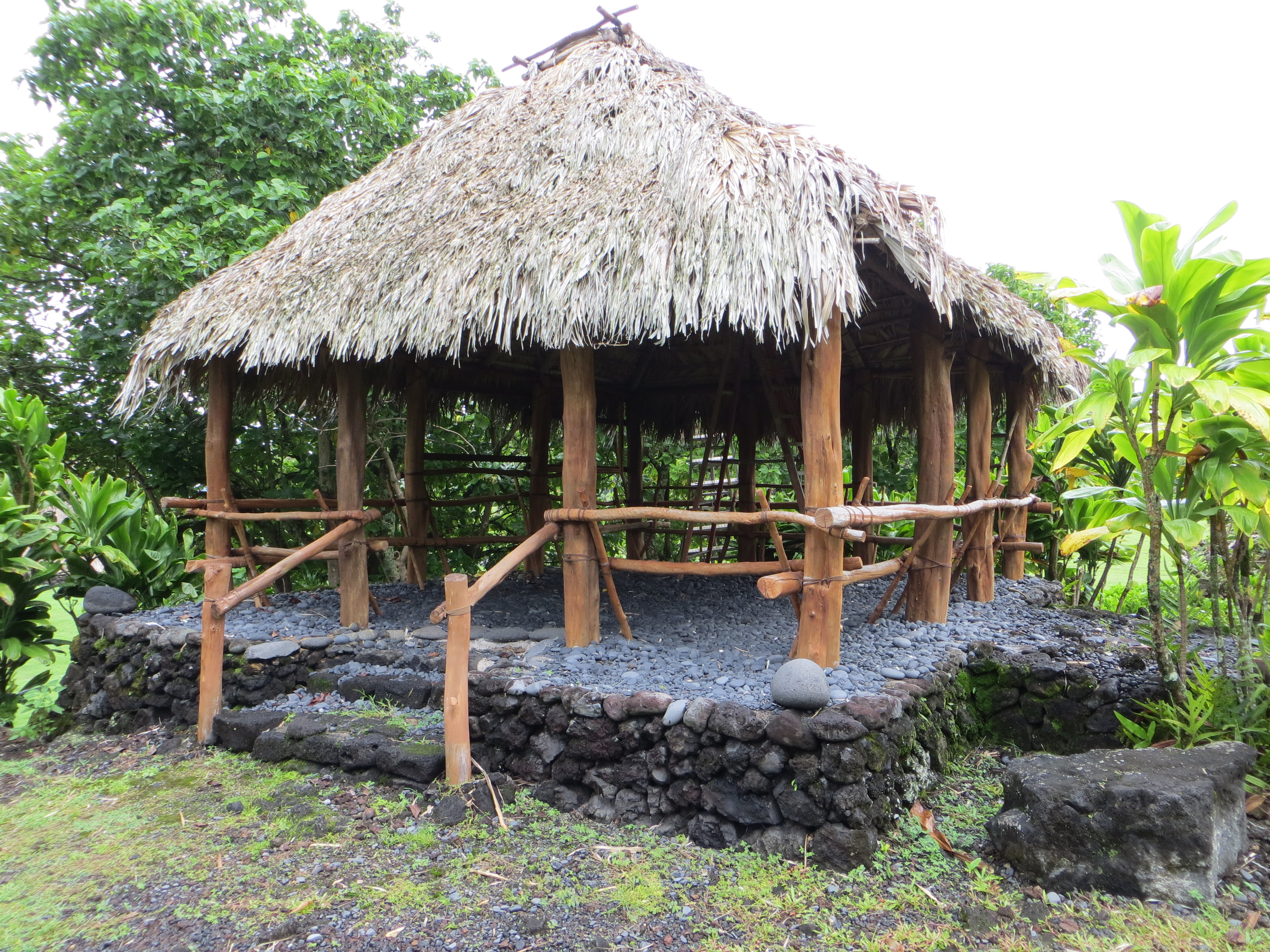
Hale Hoʻokipa ('Welcome House')

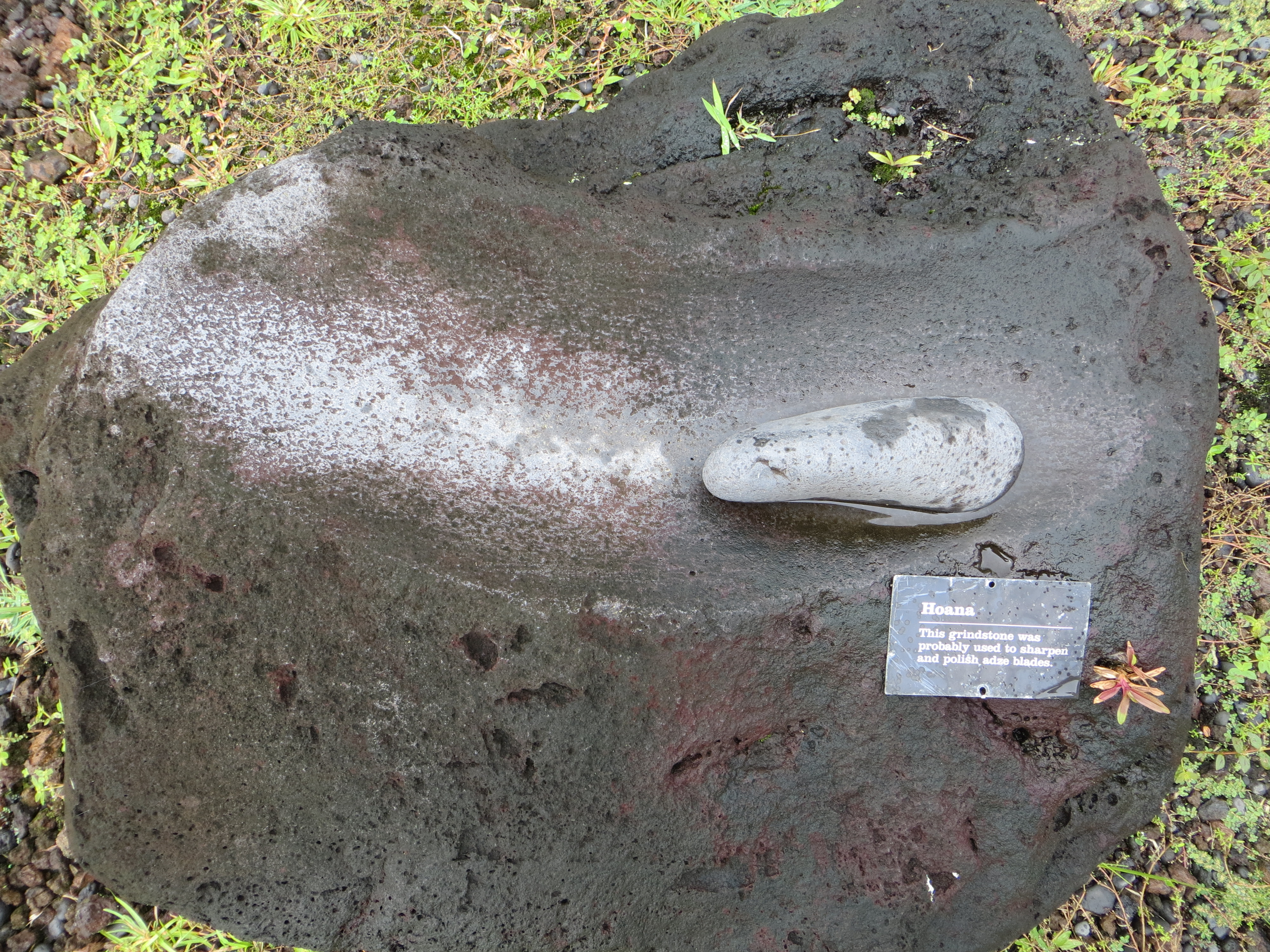
whetstone near Hale Hoʻokipa

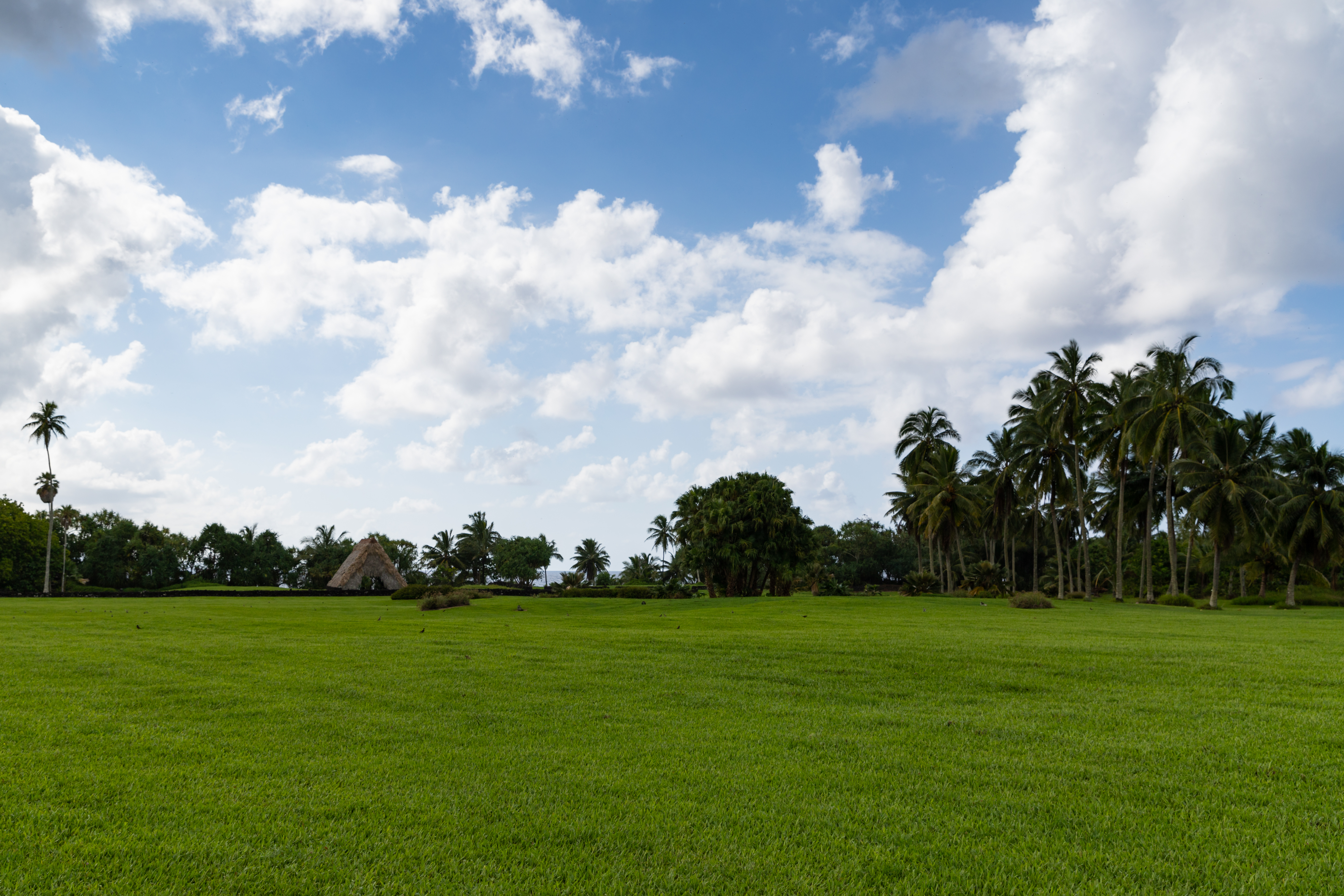
Piʻilanihale Heiau in Kahuna garden, Maui Hawaii

== See also ==
- List of botanical gardens in the United States
