= National Tropical Botanical Garden =

Nonprofit organization in United States of America

Coordinates: 21°54′24″N 159°30′40″W

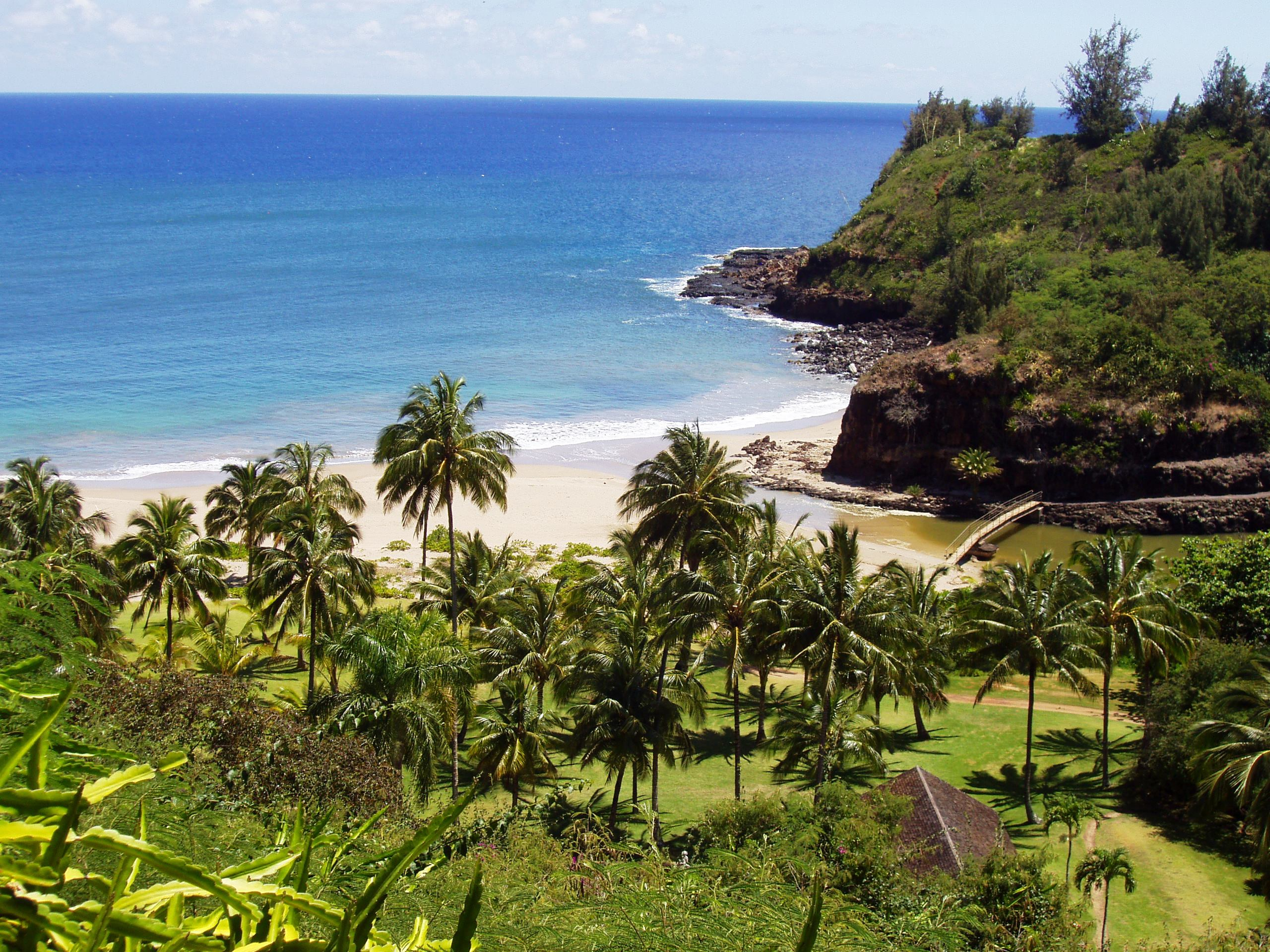
Allerton Garden on Kauaʻi island

The National Tropical Botanical Garden (NTBG) is a Hawaii-based not-for-profit institution dedicated to tropical plant research, conservation, and education. It operates a network of botanical gardens and preserves in Hawaii and Florida.

== History ==
In the early 1960s a group approached the U.S. Congress to charter a tropical botanical garden on U.S. soil. In 1964, Public Law 88-449 was enacted, which chartered the Pacific Tropical Botanical Garden (which was later renamed the National Tropical Botanical Garden). The group is a not-for-profit non-governmental institution holding a congressional charter under Title 36 of the United States Code. The NTBG's mission is to enrich life through discovery, scientific research, conservation, and education by perpetuating the survival of plants, ecosystems, and cultural knowledge of tropical regions. The NTBG pursues its mission through a network of diverse gardens and preserves in Hawai`i and Florida, each with significant biological, cultural, and historical resources; conservation, research, and reference collections (living, library, and herbarium) assembled through discovery and collaboration; research in botany, ethnobotany, horticulture, conservation biology, and restoration ecology through programs and institutes; educational courses, publications, lectures, and visitor programs; and facilities and infrastructure to conduct this work.

In 2019, the NTBG rediscovered a plant species previously deemed extinct, Hibiscadelphus woodii.

NTBG has awarded the David Fairchild Medal for Plant Exploration annually since 1999.

== Sites ==
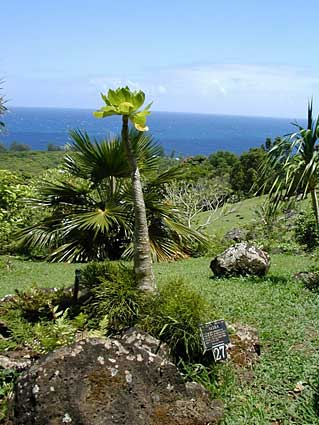
The rare ʻŌlulu (Brighamia insignis) plant at Limahuli Garden

NTBG is headquartered in Kalāheo, on the island of Kauaʻi in the state of Hawaii. The building was originally designed by architect Vladimir Ossipoff. In 2003, Dean Sakamoto constructed the Juliet Rice Wichman Botanical Research Center building, named after the conservationist and botanist. It is made of concrete so as to withstand hurricanes. Hurricane Iniki devastated the area in 1992.

Garden sites are:

- McBryde Garden – Kauaʻi
- Allerton Garden – Kauaʻi
- Limahuli Garden and Preserve – Kauaʻi
- Kahanu Garden – Maui
- The Kampong – Biscayne Bay, Coconut Grove, Florida

Thousands of species have been gathered from throughout the tropical world, through hundreds of field expeditions by staff and through collaborations with other institutions and researchers. Its living collections include the largest assemblages of native Hawaiian plant species and of breadfruit cultivars in existence. Tours of each of the gardens are available.

Preserves are also an important component of the NTBG. The preserves are seen as a refuge for nature, providing habitat for native and tropical plant species to mature and reproduce in a natural setting without the influence of human activity. They have also given scientists a way to reintroduce critically endangered species no longer found in the wild. These preserves act as large laboratories for experiments in conservation biology. The NTBG owns and manages five preserves: the Lawai Preserve (adjacent to McBryde Garden on Kauai), the Ka'upulehu Preserve, acquired in the early 1970s on the island of Hawai'i; the Awini Preserve, acquired in 1975 on the island of Hawai'i; the Kahanu Preserve (adjacent to Kahanu Garden on Maui) and the Limahuli Preserve, acquired in 1994 on Kaua'i. Preserves are not open to the public.

== Breadfruit Institute ==
The Breadfruit Institute was created by the National Tropical Botanical Garden in 2002 to increase focus on the preservation of breadfruit germplasm and promote it as a nutritional answer to global food shortages.

The Breadfruit Institute's mission is to promote the conservation and use of breadfruit for food and reforestation. The institute is taking a leading role in the conservation of breadfruit diversity and ethnobotanical research documenting traditional uses and cultural practices involving breadfruit.

== See also ==
- List of botanical gardens in the United States
