= McBryde Garden =

Botanical garden on the south shore of Kauai, Hawaii

Coordinates: 21°52′57.46″N 159°28′34.79″W

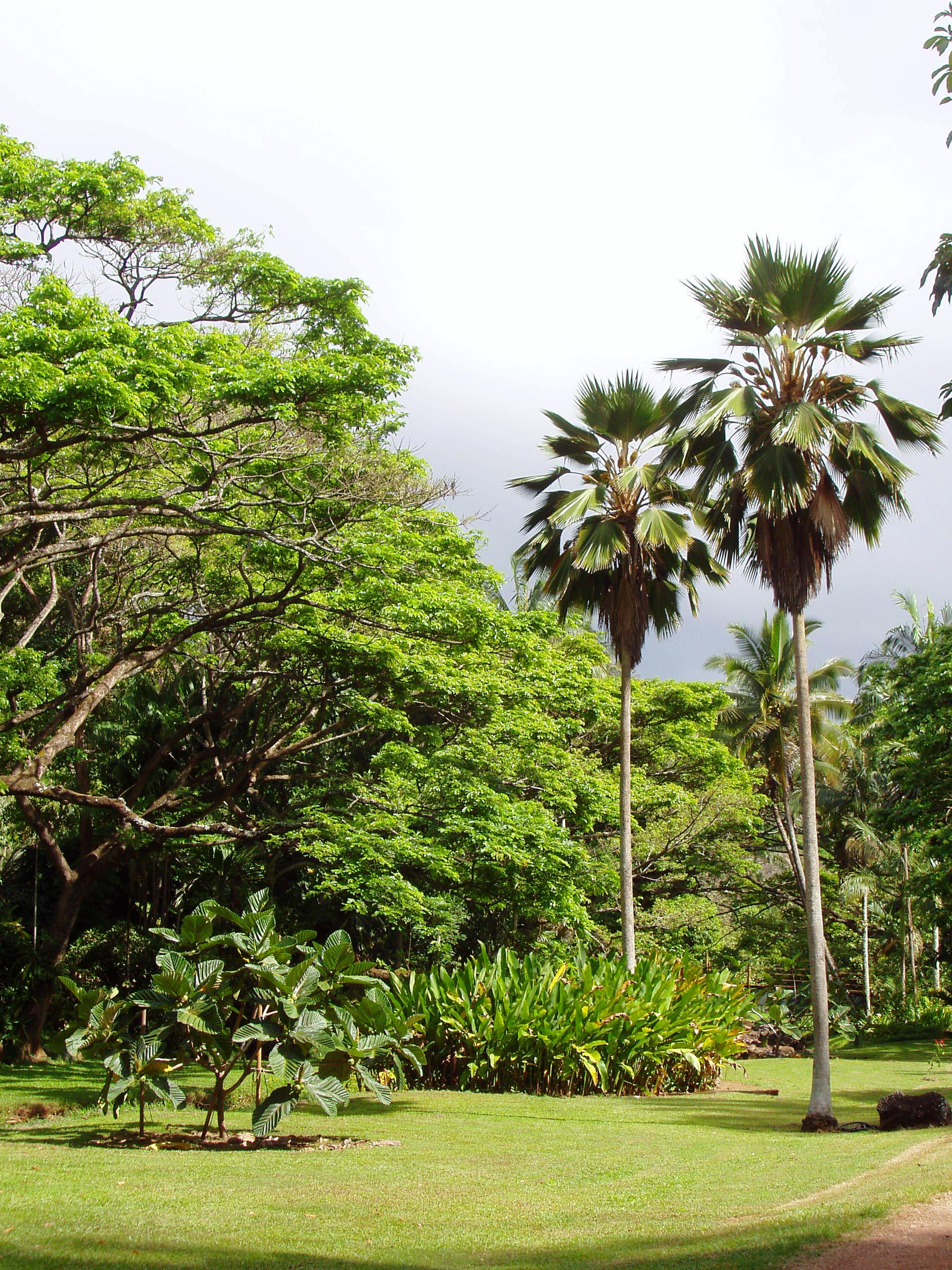
- Interactive map of McBryde Garden
- Website: Official website

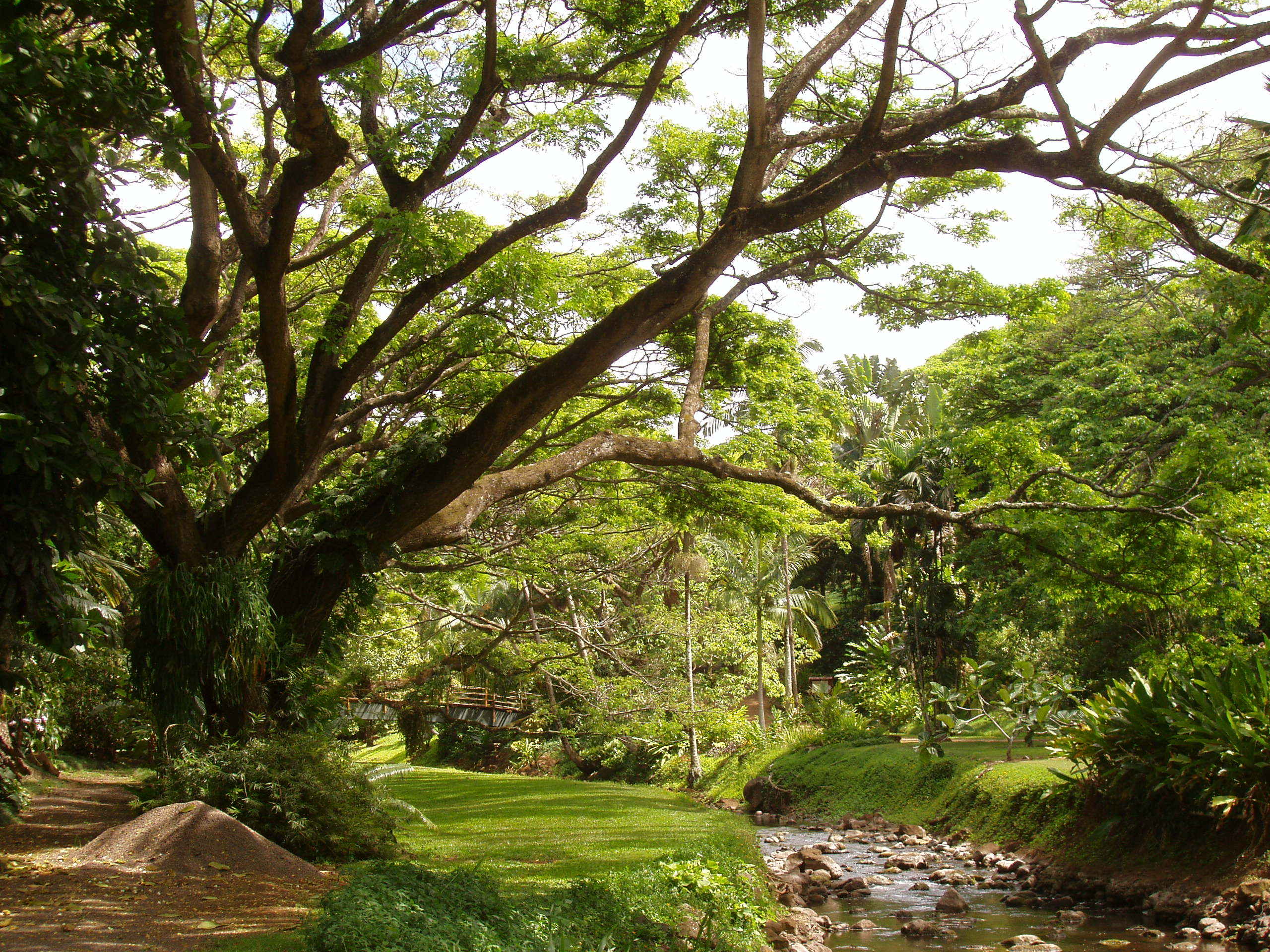
McBryde Garden.

McBryde Garden (approx. 200 acres (81 ha)) is a botanical garden located on the south shore of Kauai, Hawaii. It is one of five gardens of the non-profit National Tropical Botanical Garden (NTBG).

The garden is situated above Lāwaʻi Bay, in a valley transected by the Lāwaʻi Stream. Queen Emma of Hawaii resided above this valley for a short interval, and a modest house that was perhaps her residence has subsequently been moved to the valley floor and renovated. The valley was purchased by the McBryde family in the late 19th century for a sugarcane plantation. This first garden of the National Tropical Botanical Garden (then Pacific Tropical Botanical Garden) was started in 1970 with the purchase of 171 acres (69 ha) by the institution and has since expanded. Initially called Lāwaʻi Garden, the site was renamed in 2000 as a result of a generous donation from the McBryde descendants.

Today, McBryde Garden serves as a research and conservation garden. It is home to the largest ex situ collection of native Hawaiian flora in the world, as well as extensive plantings of palms, flowering trees, heliconias, orchids and other plants collected from tropical regions. The Garden contains a major Conservation and Horticulture Center, with nursery and micropropagation laboratory, and is adjacent to NTBG's National Headquarters, with a research and education facilities, and the Allerton Garden.

McBryde Garden is open to visitors. An admission fee is charged.

== See also ==
- National Tropical Botanical Garden
- Allerton Garden
- Limahuli Garden and Preserve
- Kahanu Garden
- The Kampong
- List of botanical gardens in the United States
