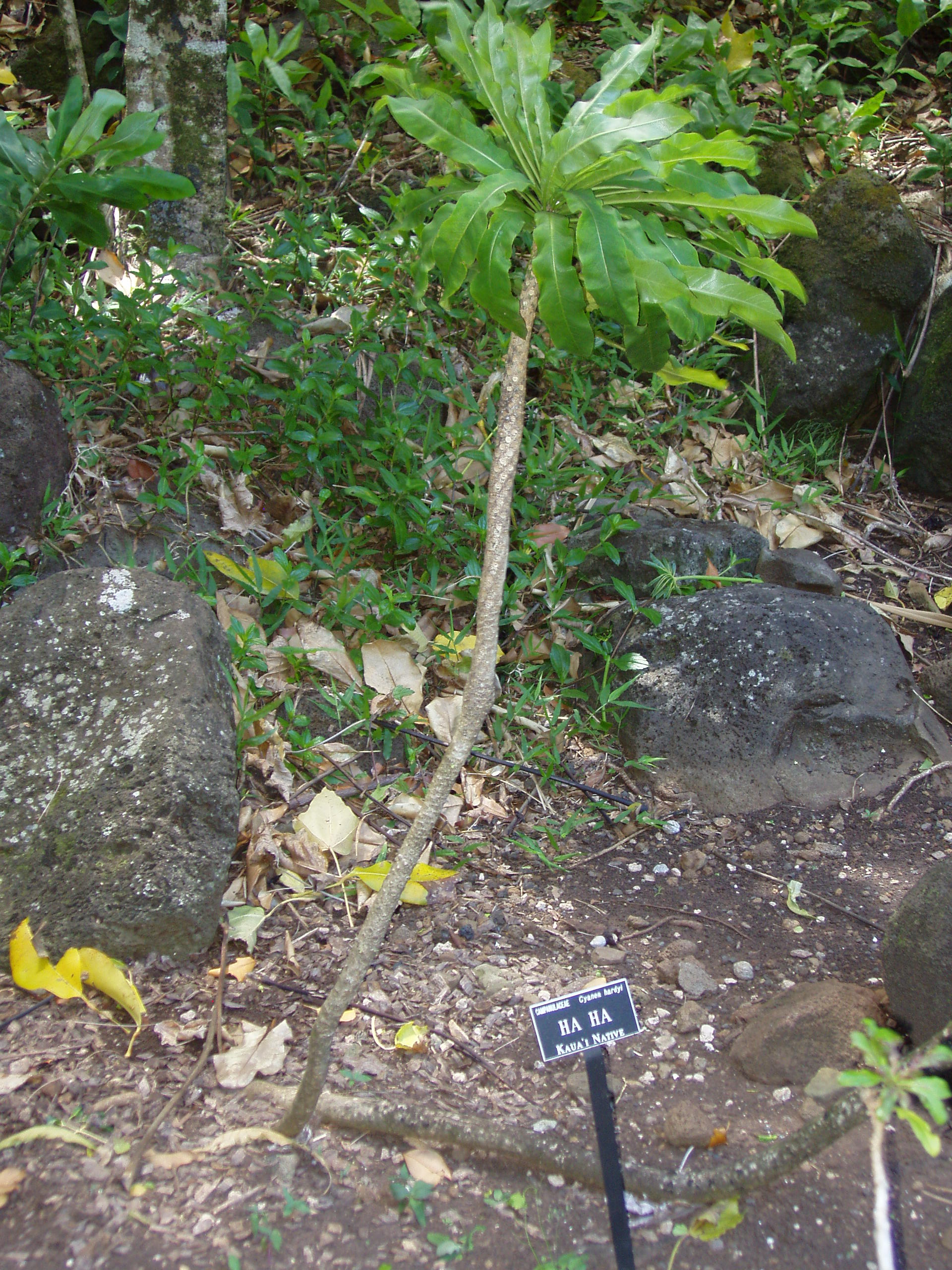
- Cyanea hardyi growing in Limahuli Garden and Preserve

Conservation status
- Endangered (IUCN 3.1)

Scientific classification
- Kingdom: Plantae
- Clade: Tracheophytes
- Clade: Angiosperms
- Clade: Eudicots
- Clade: Asterids
- Order: Asterales
- Family: Campanulaceae
- Genus: Cyanea
- Species: C. hardyi

Binomial name
- Cyanea hardyi Rock

= Cyanea hardyi =

Species of flowering plant

Cyanea hardyi, known in Hawaiian as hāhā, is a species of flowering plant in the bellflower family, Campanulaceae. This Hawaiian lobelioid is endemic to southern Kauaʻi. It inhabits forested valleys up to an elevation of 790 m (2,590 ft).
