= Makana =

Mountain on Kuai'i

Coordinates: 22°13′5″N 159°34′47″W

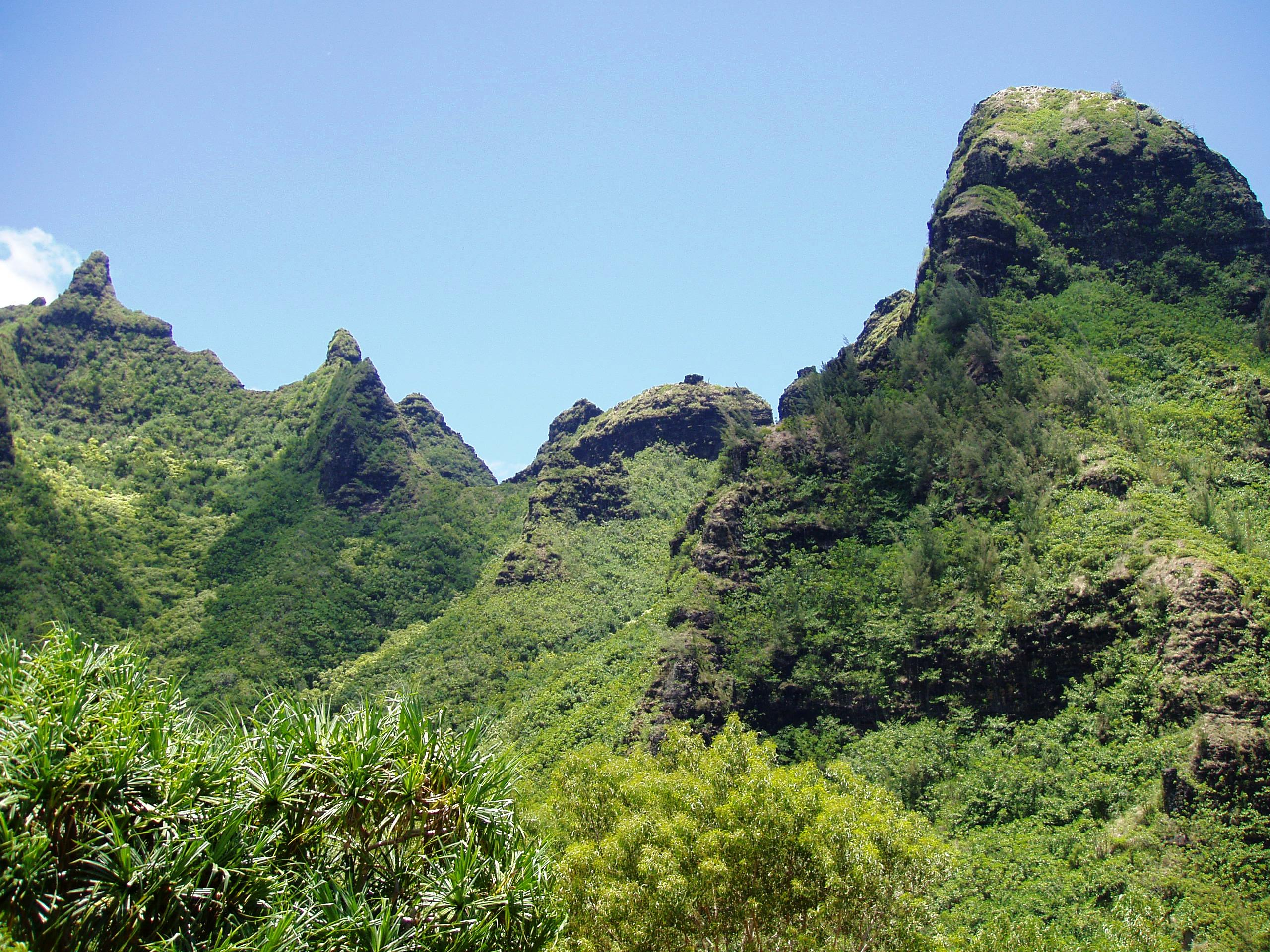
Makana Mountain ridge from Limahuli Garden and Preserve, Kauaʻi, Hawaii

Makana is a mountain located on northern shore of the island of Kauaʻi, where it rises 1,115 feet (340 m) above Limahuli Valley. Makana is a Hawaiian language term meaning gift or reward. It is often used as a person's name or as part of a name. Limahuli Garden and Preserve preserves the valley below. It was featured in the 1958 film adaptation of the musical South Pacific as Bali Haʻi and is known by that name .

Makana Mountain is one of only two locations where the fire-throwing ceremony, ʻōahi, was performed in ancient Hawaiian times. The ʻōahi was a celebration of very special occasions such as the graduation of students from the hālau hula (hula school) at Kēʻē or the visit of an aliʻi (high chief). On the day of the ceremony, skilled firethrowers climbed the steep cliffs to the very top of Makana Mountain laden with light, dry logs of pāpala (Charpentiera spp.) or hau (Hibiscus tiliaceus). When night fell, they set the logs afire and hurled them out over the ocean. Ridge lifts created by trade winds hitting the sheer cliff of Makana kept the firebrands aloft, soaring as far as 1 mi (1.6 km) out to sea. The result was a night sky filled with sparks and fiery torches tracing long arcs of light. It is sometimes called "Fireworks Cliff".

People in canoes would crowd the ocean below Makana, trying to catch the firebrands. It was considered heroic to catch the flaming embers, and those who succeeded would often mark themselves with the fire in honor of the occasion. Couples who caught the firebrands would both mark themselves in the same way, as a sign of love and commitment.

The practice ended in the 19th century, with the last ceremony having been in honor of Queen Emma.
