= Limahuli Garden and Preserve =

Botanical garden in Kauaʻi, Hawaiʻi, US

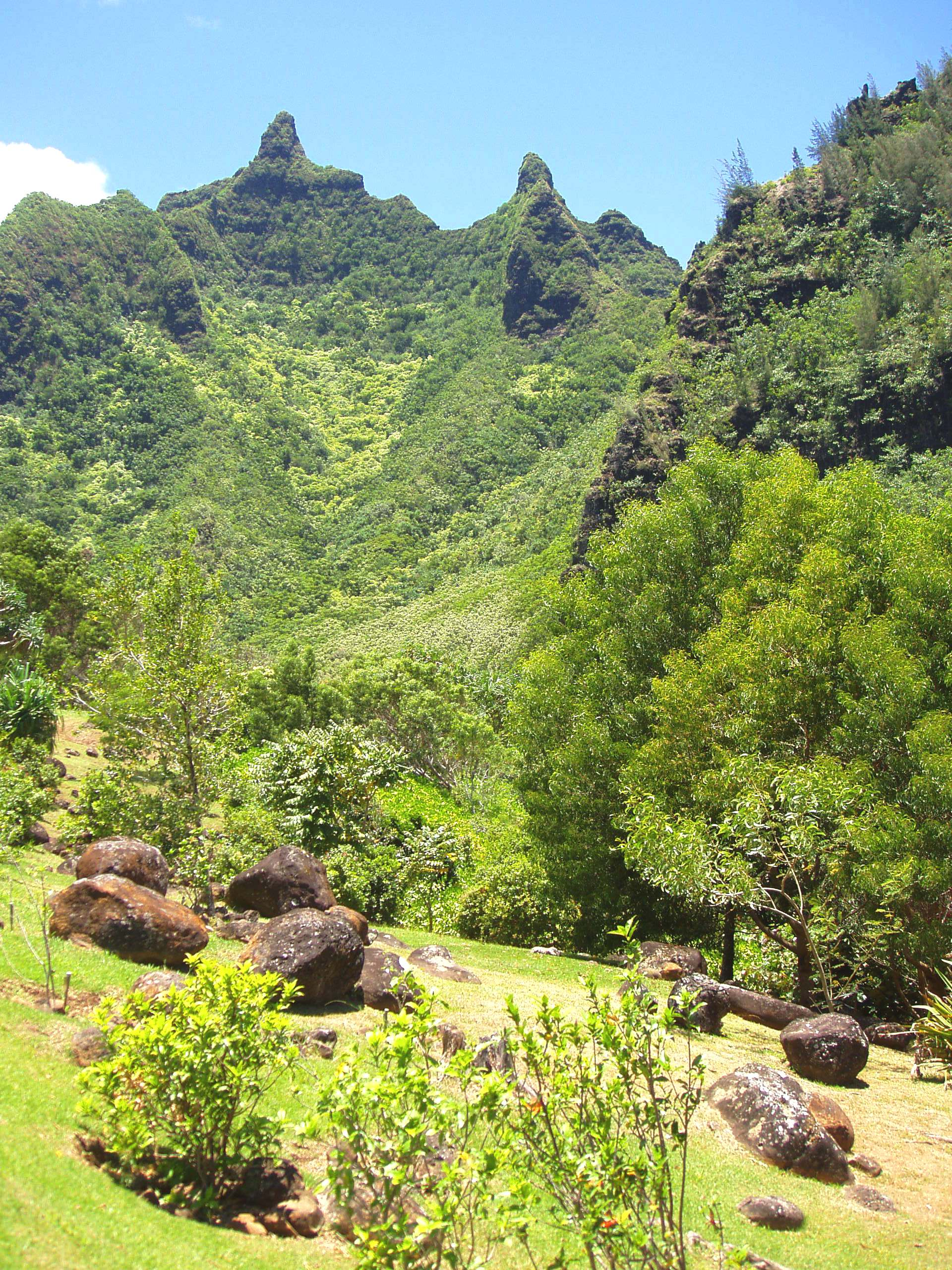
- Interactive map of Limahuli Garden and Preserve

The Limahuli Garden and Preserve is a 17-acre botanical garden (6.9 ha) and 985-acre nature preserve (399 ha) on the north shore of Kauaʻi island, Hawaiʻi. It is one of the five gardens of the nonprofit National Tropical Botanical Garden.

== Description ==
Limahuli lies within a tropical valley covering three distinct ecological zones. The Makana Mountain ridge looms behind, and the Limahuli Stream includes an 800-foot (240 m) waterfall on its descent from the valley's high end at 3,330 feet (1,010 m) to sea level just below the garden. Lima huli means "turned hand" in the Hawaiian language.

The garden contains a wide range of native and Polynesian-introduced plants, including kukui (Aleurites moluccana), banana, breadfruit, alula (Brighamia insignis), paper mulberry (Broussonetia papyrifera), papala (Charpentiera elliptica), kī (Cordyline fruticosa), turmeric (Curcuma domestica), hāhā (Cyanea hardyi), lama (Diospyros sandwicensis), vegetable fern (Diplazium esculentum), ginger, hau kuahiwi (Hibiscadelphus distans), hibiscus including kokiʻo keʻokeʻo (Hibiscus waimeae), kava, koa (Acacia koa), nehe (Lipochaeta succulenta), ʻōhiʻa lehua (Metrosideros polymorpha), pokulakalaka (Munroidendron racemosum), kului (Nototrichium divaricatum), hala (Pandanus tectorius), pāpala kēpau (Pisonia wagneriana), plumeria, loʻulu (Pritchardia limahuliensis), sugarcane, taro, and iliau (Wilkesia gymnoxiphium).

It includes taro terraces (loʻi kalo) that date to early Polynesian arrivals on the island. These were part of an ancient ahupuaʻa, a sophisticated land-management and food-production system.

In 1997 the American Horticultural Society named Limahuli Garden the best natural botanical garden in the United States. In 2007, the Hawaiʻi Tourism Authority gave it the top "Keep It Hawaiʻi" award for its support of Hawaiian culture and protection and development of Hawaiian knowledge by preservation of natural resources through research, hands-on work, and educational opportunities.

Limahuli Garden is open to visitors. An admission fee is charged. The preserve area is not open to the public. It is inland from Haʻena State Park and Keʻe beach off Route 560 (near its western end) at 22°13′13″N 159°34′33″W. The preserve was established with 13 acres (5.3 ha) donated by Juliet Rice Wichman in 1967 and extended by her grandson Charles "Chipper" Rice Wichman, who were descended from businessman William Hyde Rice and missionary William Harrison Rice. Mount Makana, which rises above Limahuli Valley, is sometimes called Bali Ha'i, a name used in the 1958 film South Pacific, which was filmed in the area.

== Gallery ==
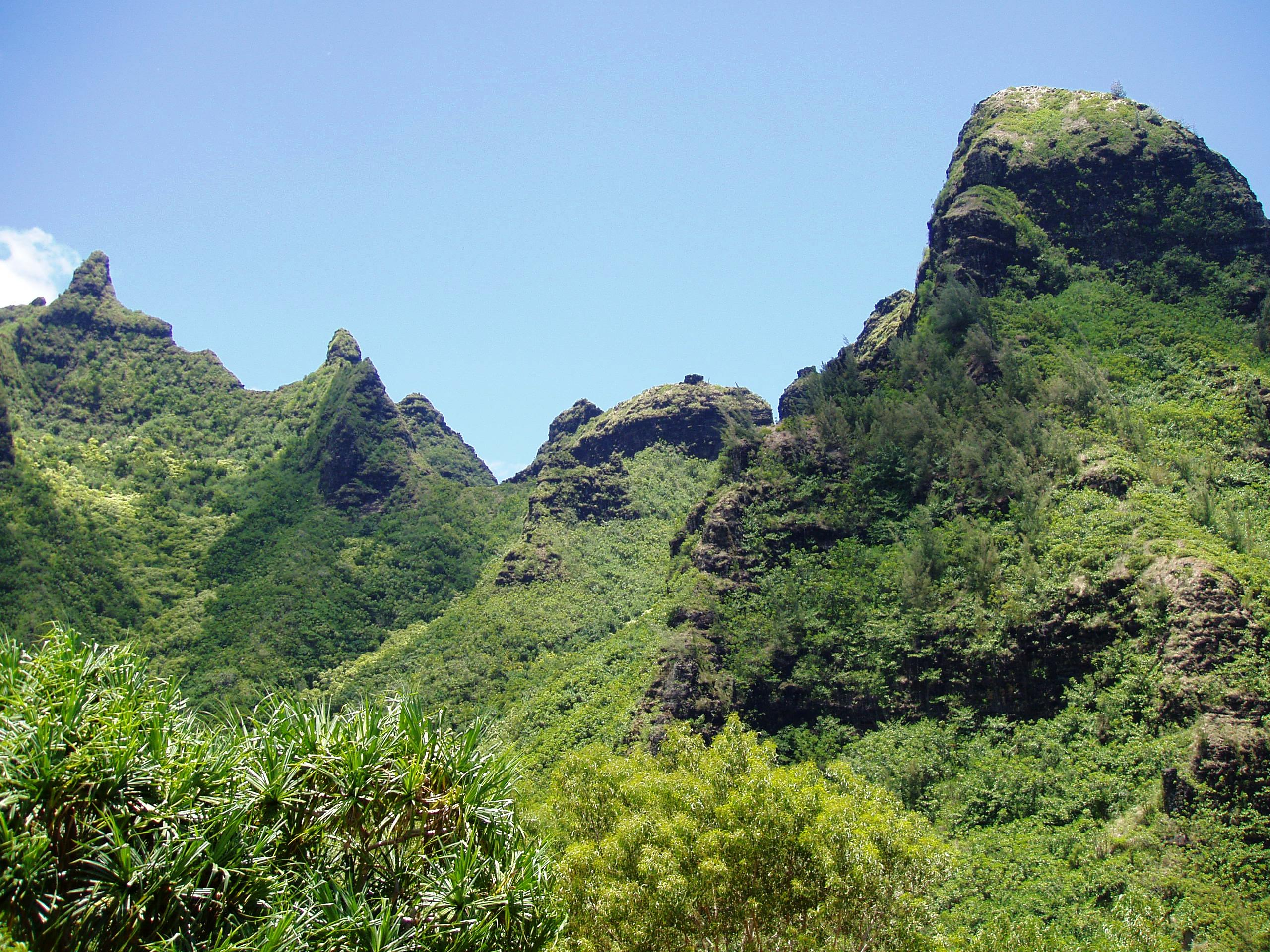
Makana Mountain ridge, as seen from the garden.

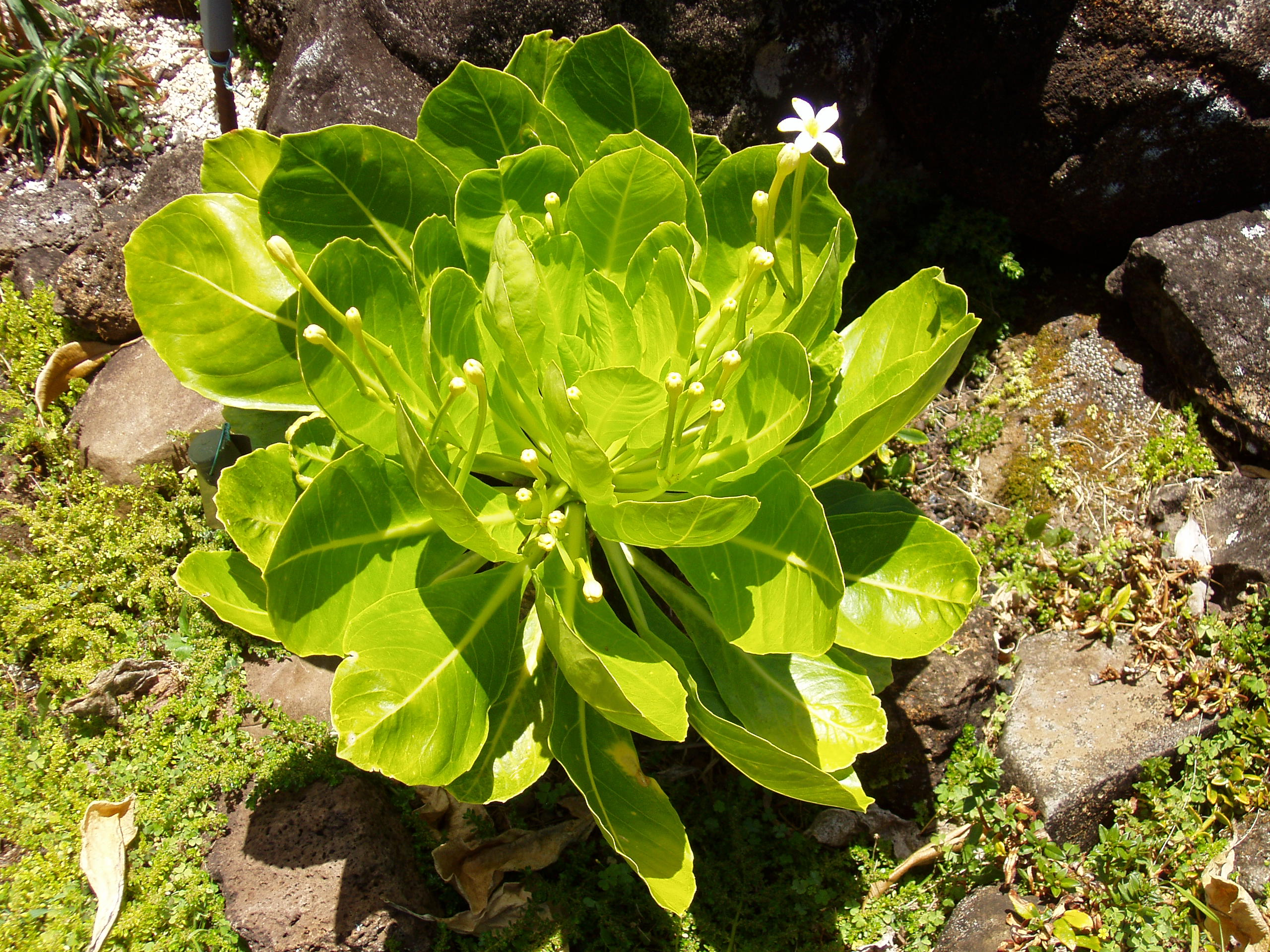
Alula (Brighamia insignis) plant.

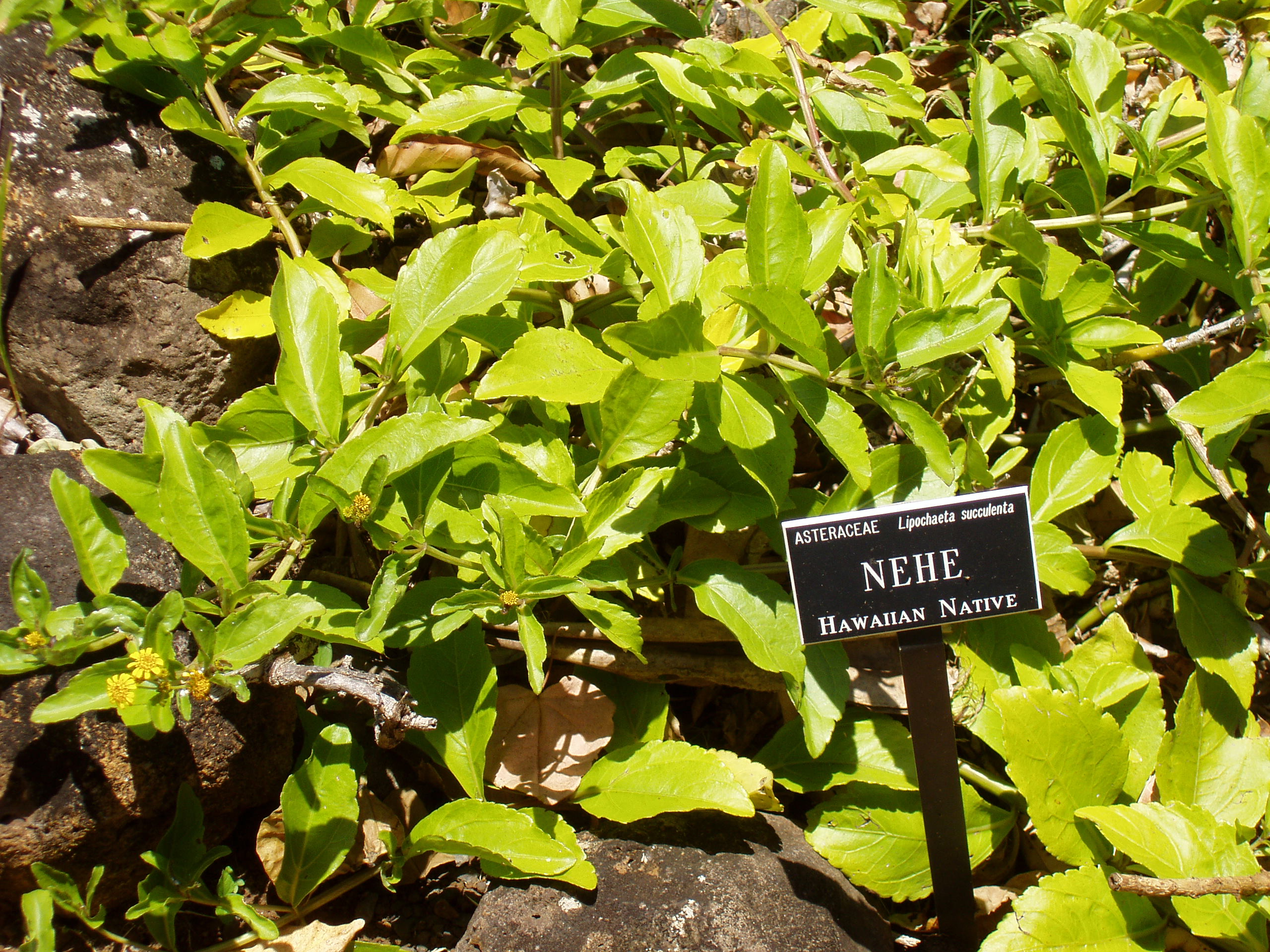

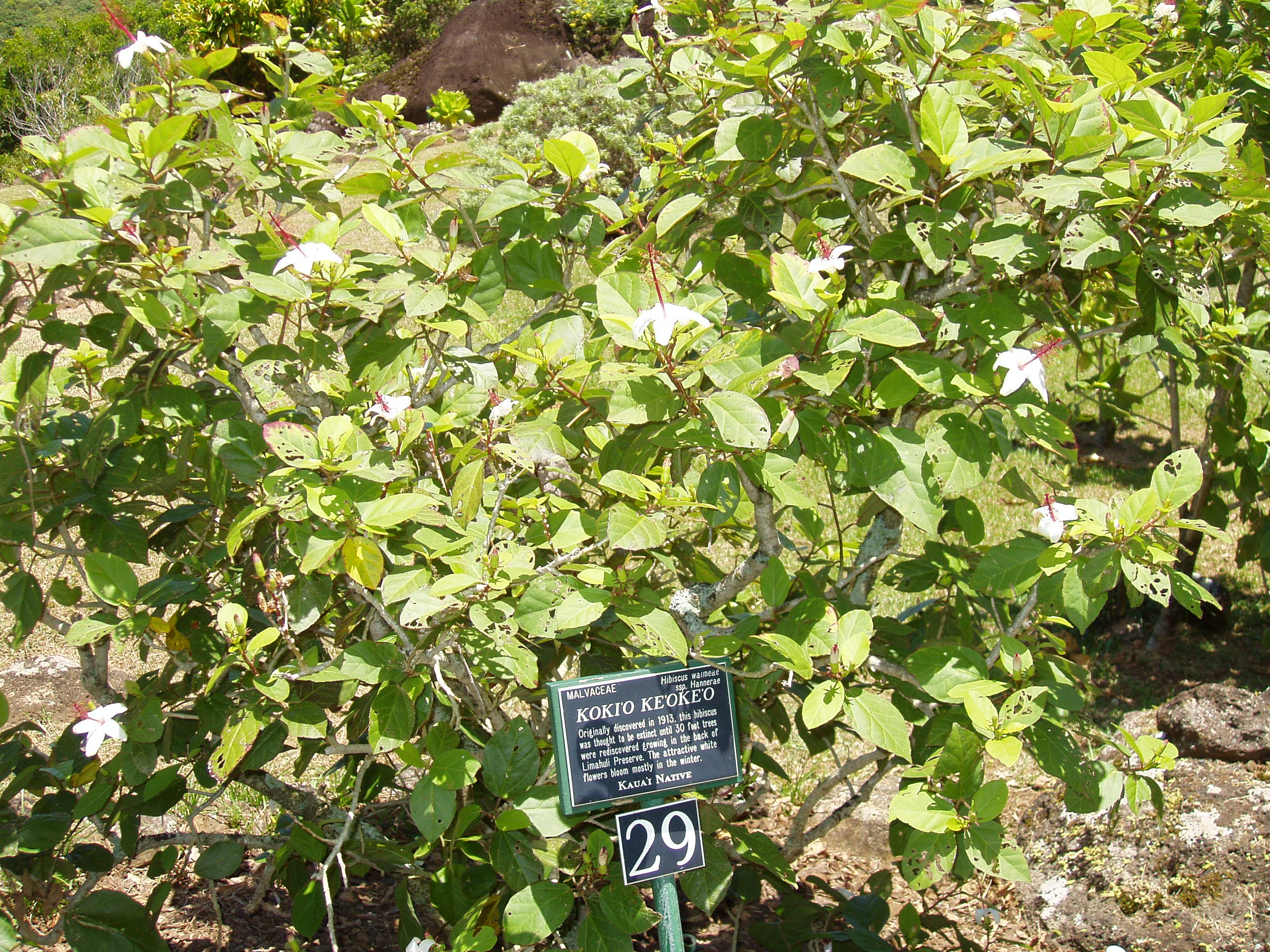
Hibiscus thought to be extinct, rediscovered in the back of the preserve.

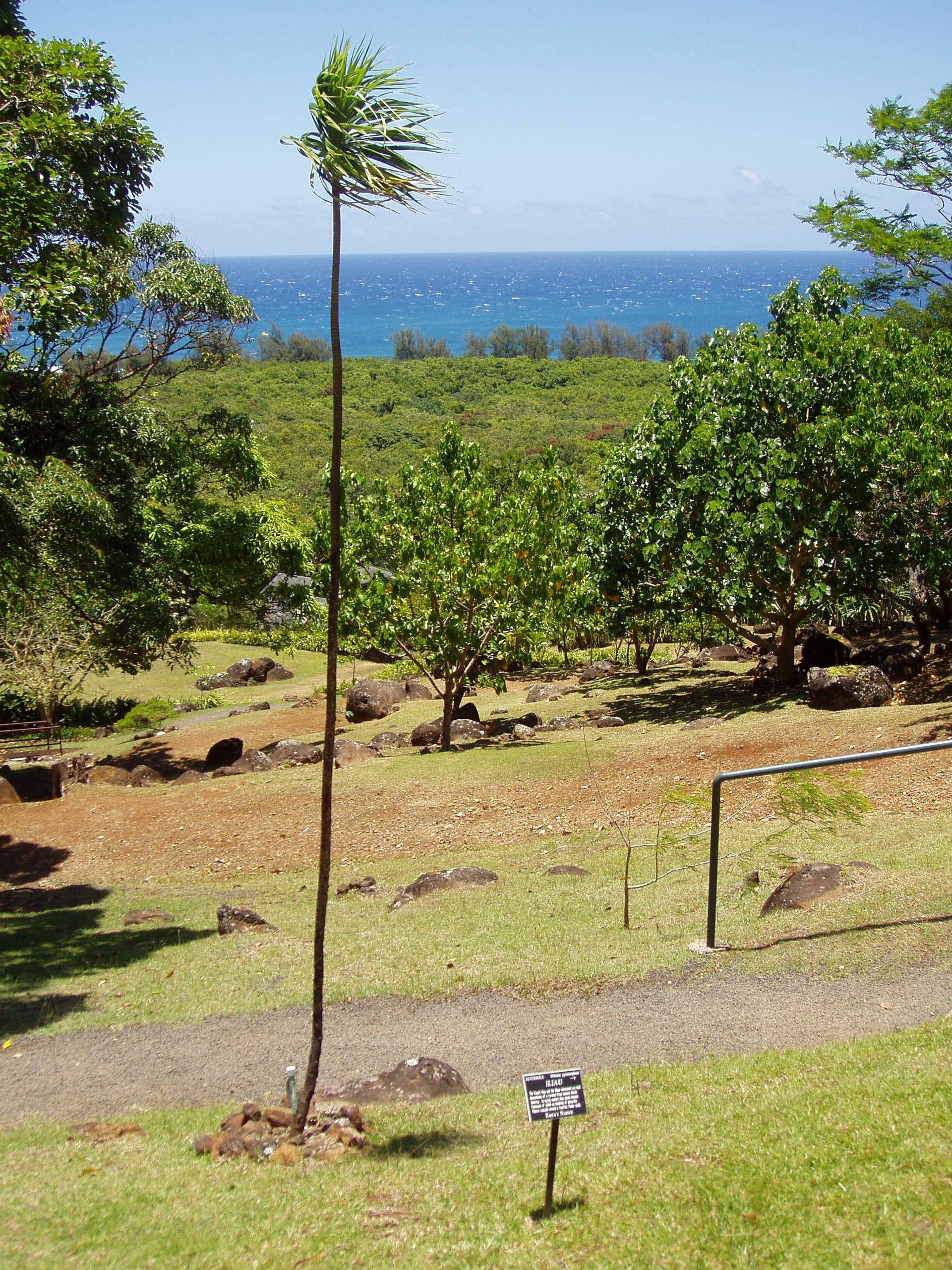

== See also ==
- National Tropical Botanical Garden
- McBryde Garden
- Allerton Garden
- Kahanu Garden
- The Kampong
- List of botanical gardens in the United States
