= The Kampong =

Large tropical garden in Miami, Florida

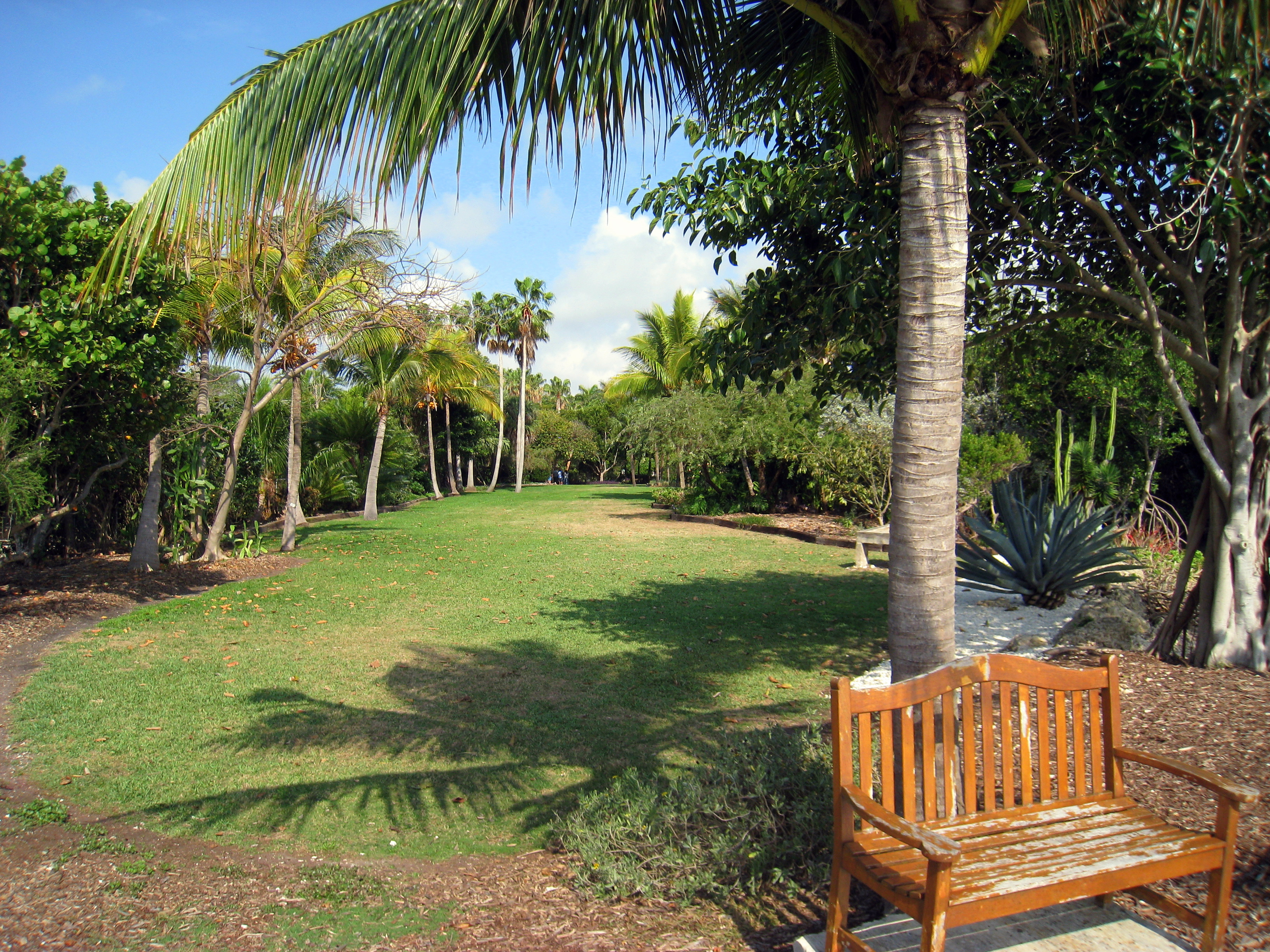
- Interactive map of The Kampong
- Type: Private
- Location: 4013 Douglas Road, Coconut Grove, Miami, Florida, United States
- Area: 11 acres (45,000 m^{2})
- Created: 1984
- Operator: National Tropical Botanical Garden
- Status
- Website: Official website
- The Kampong
- U.S. National Register of Historic Places
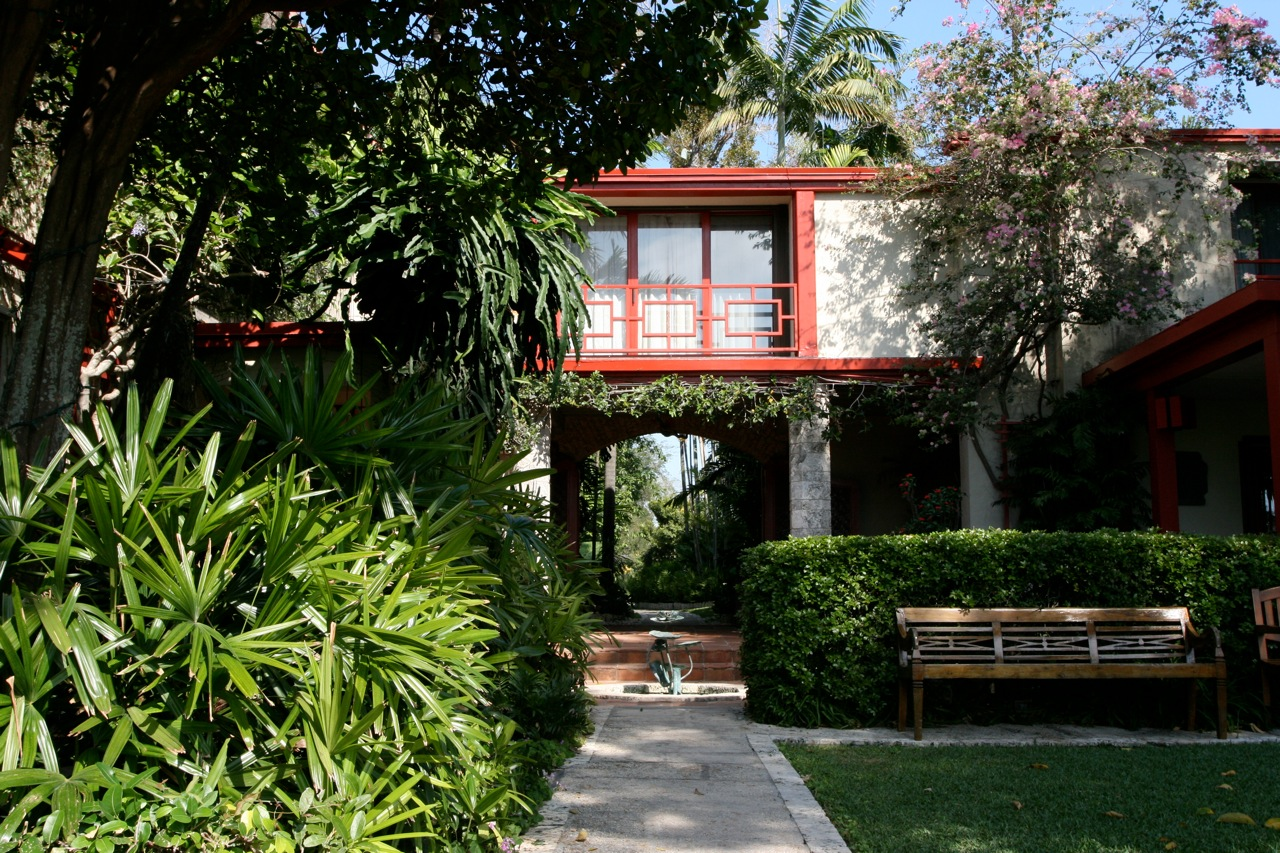
- Original Fairchild home with Sweeney addition from courtyard

- Location within Miami Location within Florida Location within the United States
- Coordinates: 25°42′53″N 80°14′59″W
- Architect: Edward Clarence Dean and Max Strang
- Architectural style: Mission/Spanish Revival
- NRHP reference No.: 84000837
- Added to NRHP: March 1, 1984

The Kampong is a botanical garden in the Coconut Grove neighborhood of Miami, Florida, United States. It is one of the five gardens of the non-profit National Tropical Botanical Garden (NTBG). It is open Tuesday through Saturday (9:00am-3:00pm). Visitors are encouraged to make reservations to visit, though tickets can be purchased on site.

== History ==
The Kampong was bought as a winter home by the famed horticulturalist David Fairchild and his wife Marian in 1916. For many years he managed the Department of Plant Introduction program of the U.S. Department of Agriculture in Washington, D.C., searching the world for plants that could be useful and successfully introduced into the United States. Fairchild introduced around 30,000 plant species and varietals into the U.S.

At his home in Florida, Fairchild created a garden that contained many of the plants that he obtained throughout his trips. In 1931 Marian's sister Elsie and her husband, Gilbert Hovey Grosvenor, acquired the adjoining property on the north to use as their winter home. Fairchild and his wife made the Kampong their permanent home from 1928 until their deaths in 1954 and 1962 respectively.

A year after David Fairchild's wife's death, the land was purchased by Catherine Hauberg Sweeney, a botanist and preservationist. Sweeney maintained Fairchild's garden and was vital in its preservation for future use and study, securing its listing on the National Register of Historic Places. In 1984 Sweeney donated the property to the then Pacific Tropical Botanical Garden (now National Tropical Botanical Garden), and remained its principal sponsor until her death in 1995.

== Leadership ==
The Kampong's first director from July 1996 to February 1998, Thomas Lodge, oversaw completion of The Fairchild-Sweeney House renovations. He also was key in researching David Fairchild's role in the establishment of Everglades National Park. Larry Schokman served as Mrs. Sweeney's superintendent for 11 years, until 1984 when The Kampong became part of the National Tropical Botanical Garden (NTBG), and Schokman became an NTBG employee. As director of horticulture and then assistant director under Lodge, Schokman maintained a close working and personal relationship with Sweeney until her death in 1995. He became director of The Kampong in 1998 and retired in August 2007. He died in October 2017.

Following Schokman, David Lee was director of The Kampong from 2007 to 2009. Lee was formerly the chair of biological sciences at Florida International University, where he worked for 26 years. Lee helped to safeguard The Kampong's southern boundary from development encroachment, and provided guidance for The Kampong's board of governors.

In 2009, Ann Parsons took on the role of director of The Kampong. Formerly the director of education at Norfolk Botanical Garden, Parsons, along with curator of living collections David T. Jones, were tasked with preserving the rich legacy of The Kampong while planning for the future. They are doing just that—in 2011, more than 5,000 guests visited the historic estate and garden through tours, educational programs and special events. Michael Maunder was Director from 2013 to 2016. Craig Morell, formerly the horticulturist at Pinecrest Gardens became the Director of The Kampong in 2017, retiring in May 2022. Appealing to a wider spectrum of visitors than ever before, The Kampong is an urban oasis with over 1200 species of fruit trees, palms, ethnobotanical plants and teaching collections for botanical study. These visitors are key in helping spread The Kampong message about the importance of protecting, preserving, and studying tropical plants.

== Facilities ==
Today the Kampong's living collections include tropical fruits including pomelo, 23 cultivars of avocado, and 65 varieties of mango, palms, flowering trees, ficus, aroids, and bamboo. This garden serves as the mainland campus for the NTBG. In addition to the diverse living collections which are the core of The Kampong, there are living quarters for researchers and scientists, as well as meeting facilities for larger groups. The site is also well configured for weddings and outdoor functions of all varieties.

- The Fairchild-Sweeney House – designed by architect Edward Clarence Dean, constructed in 1928, as a combination of Spanish and Southeast Asian influences. A later renovation to the home incorporated more modern features and added a second floor over a portion of the home, resulting in an unusual blend of styles. Visitors included Thomas Edison and Henry Ford.

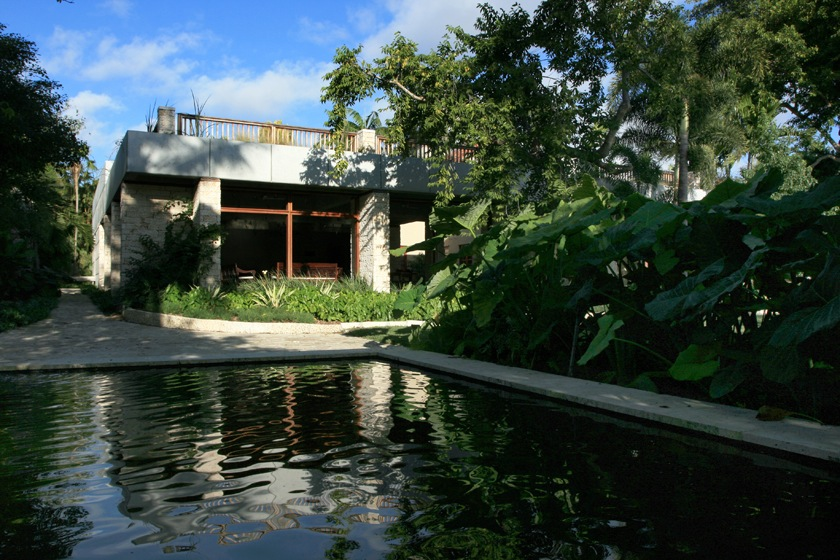
Schokman Education Center.

- The Schokman Education Center – designed by architect Max Strang, completed in 2007, as an outdoor pavilion incorporating oolitic limestone and exposed concrete.
- The Scarborough Dormitory is specifically designed to house visiting researchers and students. It was built in 2006 to accommodate an increase in Botany studies from students from around the world. It is in use frequently, and the students have the ability to study Kampong plant species day and night. The dormitory has 12 beds available with study and patio space on the ground floor.
- The Barbour Cottage- built in 1926 to house visiting dignitaries and people of influence at Fairchild's invitation, the Barbour Cottage is often used today by visiting researchers, teachers and scientists.
- The Sausage Tree Cottage was built in 1964 to house family and friends of the family, and is used today to house teachers and scientists who are in town for conferences or to do short-term research projects both on site and elsewhere.
- The Explorer's Cottage (formerly the home of Curator David Jones) has been renovated and is well used by education groups, as well as multi-function space for students and business groups.

== See also ==
- Fairchild Tropical Botanic Garden
- National Tropical Botanical Garden
- McBryde Garden
- Allerton Garden
- Limahuli Garden and Preserve
- Kahanu Garden
- List of botanical gardens in the United States
