= Allerton Garden =

Botanical garden located in Kauai, Hawaii, United States

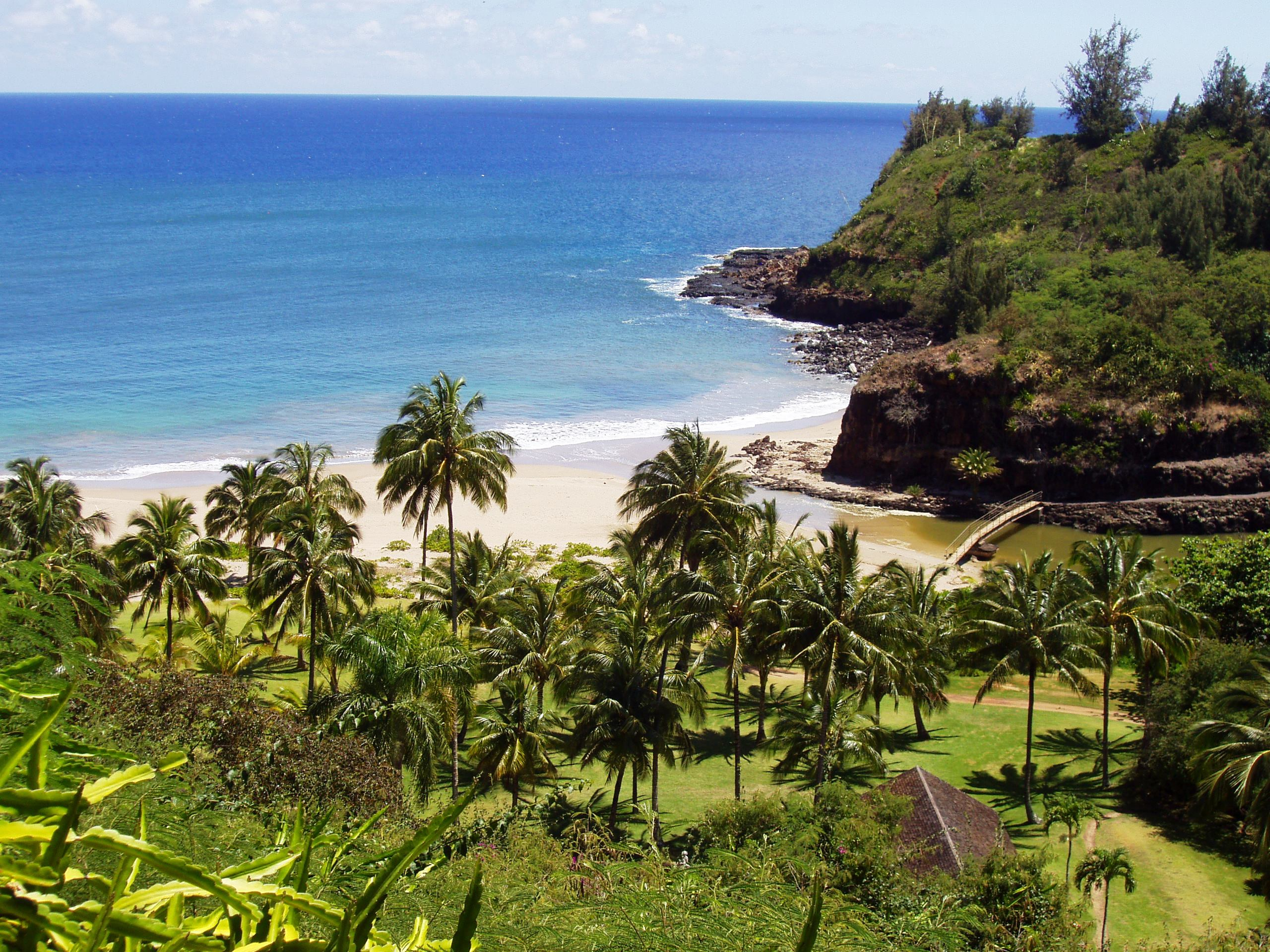
- Allerton Garden, view from above.

- Location within Hawaii
- Interactive map of Allerton Garden
- Type: sculpture park
- Coordinates: 21°53′8.67″N 159°29′33.04″W
- Area: 80-acre (320,000 m^{2})
- Website: Official website

Allerton Garden, also known as Lāwaʻi-kai, is a botanical garden, originally created by Robert Allerton and John Gregg Allerton, located on the south shore of Kauai, Hawaii. The garden covers an 80-acre (320,000 m^{2}) area and is situated beside the Lāwaʻi Bay, in a valley transected by the Lāwaʻi Stream. It is one of the five gardens of the non-profit National Tropical Botanical Garden.

== Garden history ==
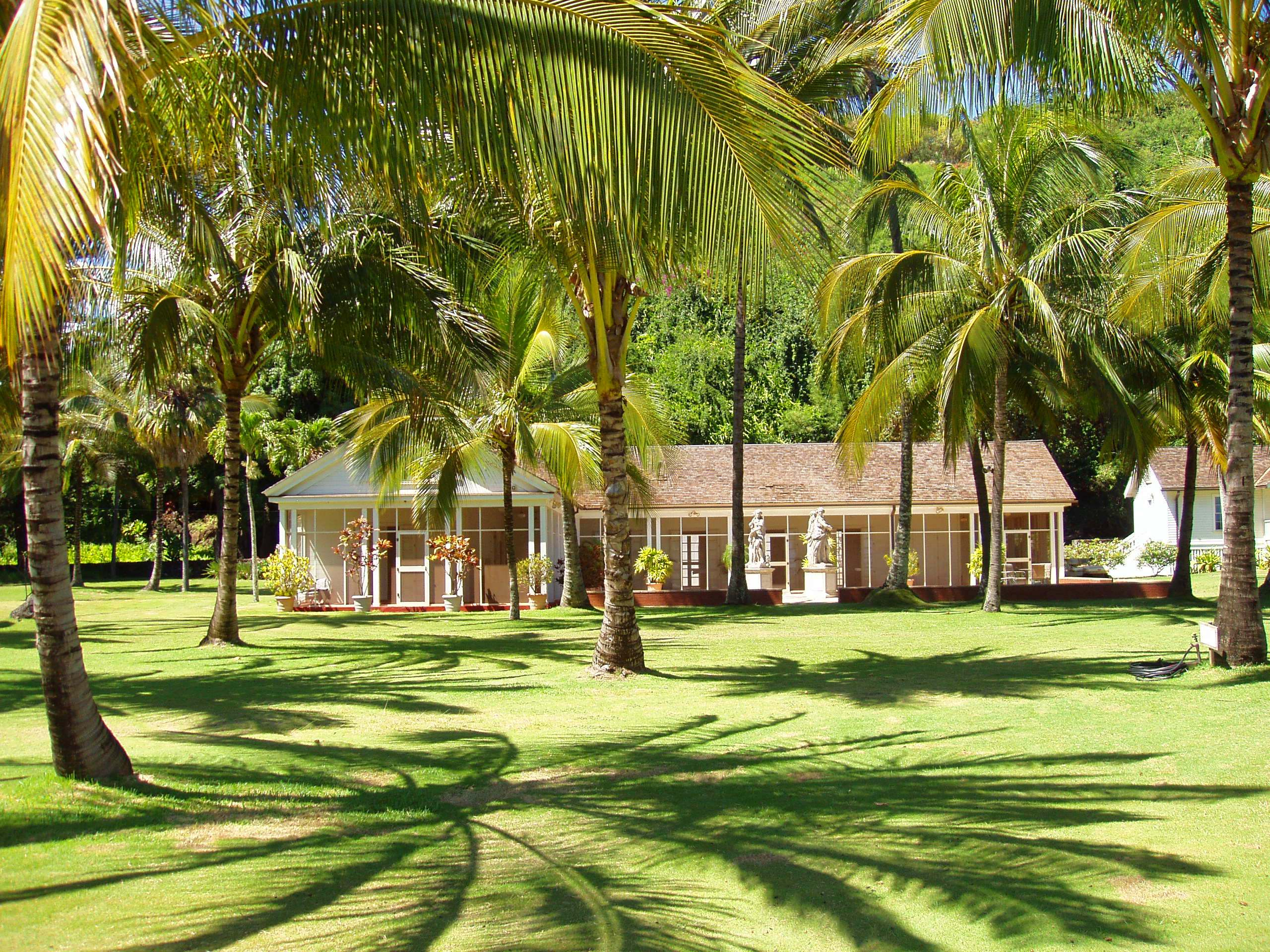
Allerton house.

Queen Emma of Hawaii resided above this valley for a short interval, and a modest house that was perhaps her residence has subsequently been moved to the valley floor and renovated. The entire valley, including what is now the adjacent McBryde Garden, was purchased by the McBryde family in the late 19th century for a sugarcane plantation.

Robert Allerton, who had a lifelong passion for garden design, sculpture, and landscape architecture had already expressed it at "The Farms" estate and sculpture gardens in Illinois (now Robert Allerton Park). His adopted son John Gregg Allerton had studied architecture at the University of Illinois in the 1920s. In 1938 they came to Hawaii and purchased a relatively small portion of Queen Emma's plantation for a residence and gardens. They quickly began designing the landscape master plan and individual gardens, incorporating Hawaiian and new plants they had acquired from tropical Asia and other Pacific Islands, built landscape elements, and sculptures from "The Farms."

== Tropical Botanical Garden ==
Allerton would later join a group of individuals and organizations who were pushing for the establishment of a tropical botanical garden on U.S. soil. In his final year before he died, Allerton was able to witness the charter being granted and the creation of the Pacific Tropical Botanical Garden (now National Tropical Botanical Garden). John Gregg Allerton maintained the garden until his death in 1986, and left it in trust. In the early 1990s, management was assumed by the National Tropical Botanical Garden and the garden was named after its founding fathers.

== Garden touring ==
Allerton Garden includes garden rooms, pools, miniature waterfalls, fountains, and statues. It is open to visitors. An admission fee is charged.

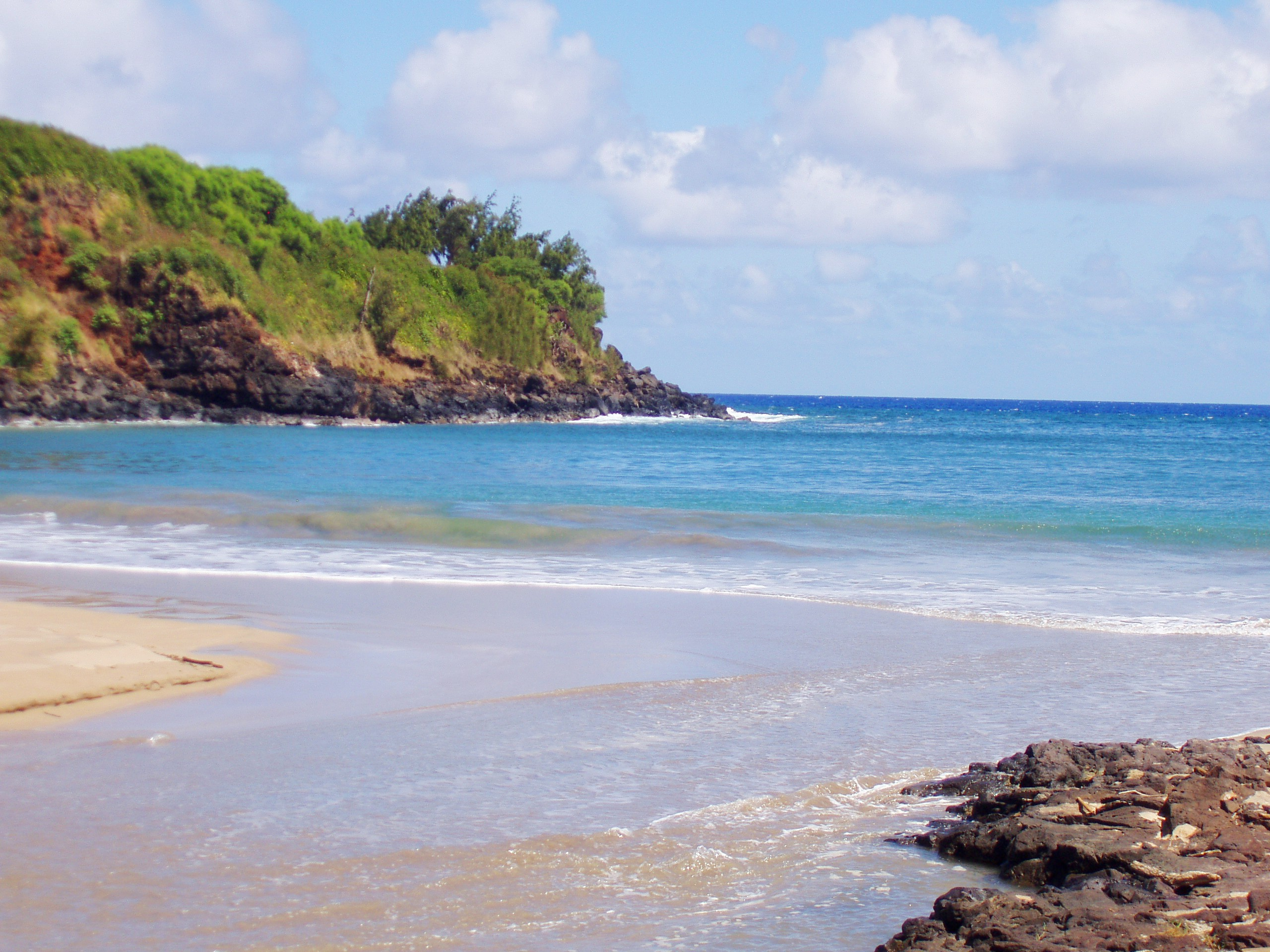
Lāwaʻi Bay

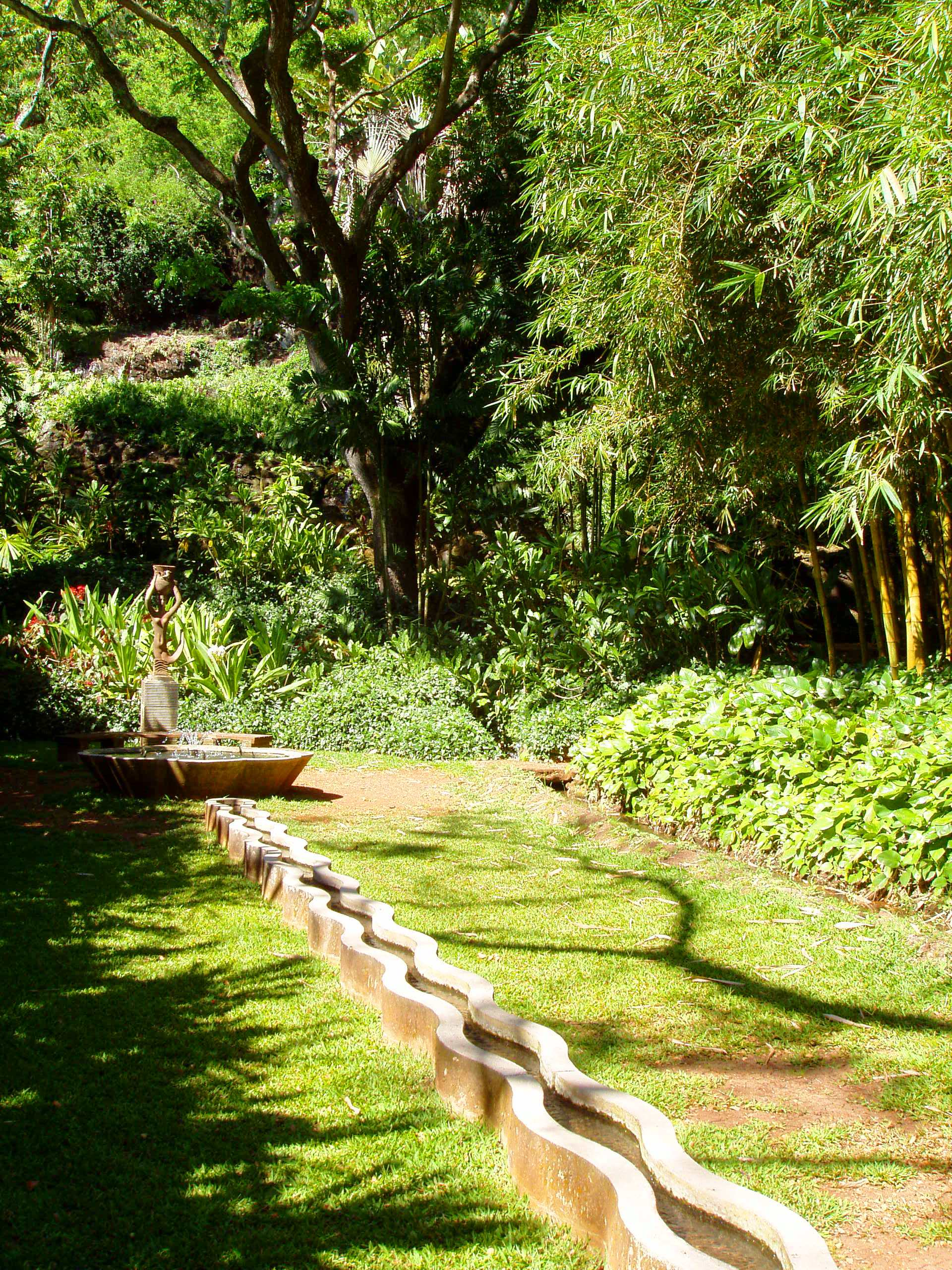
Mermaid Fountain

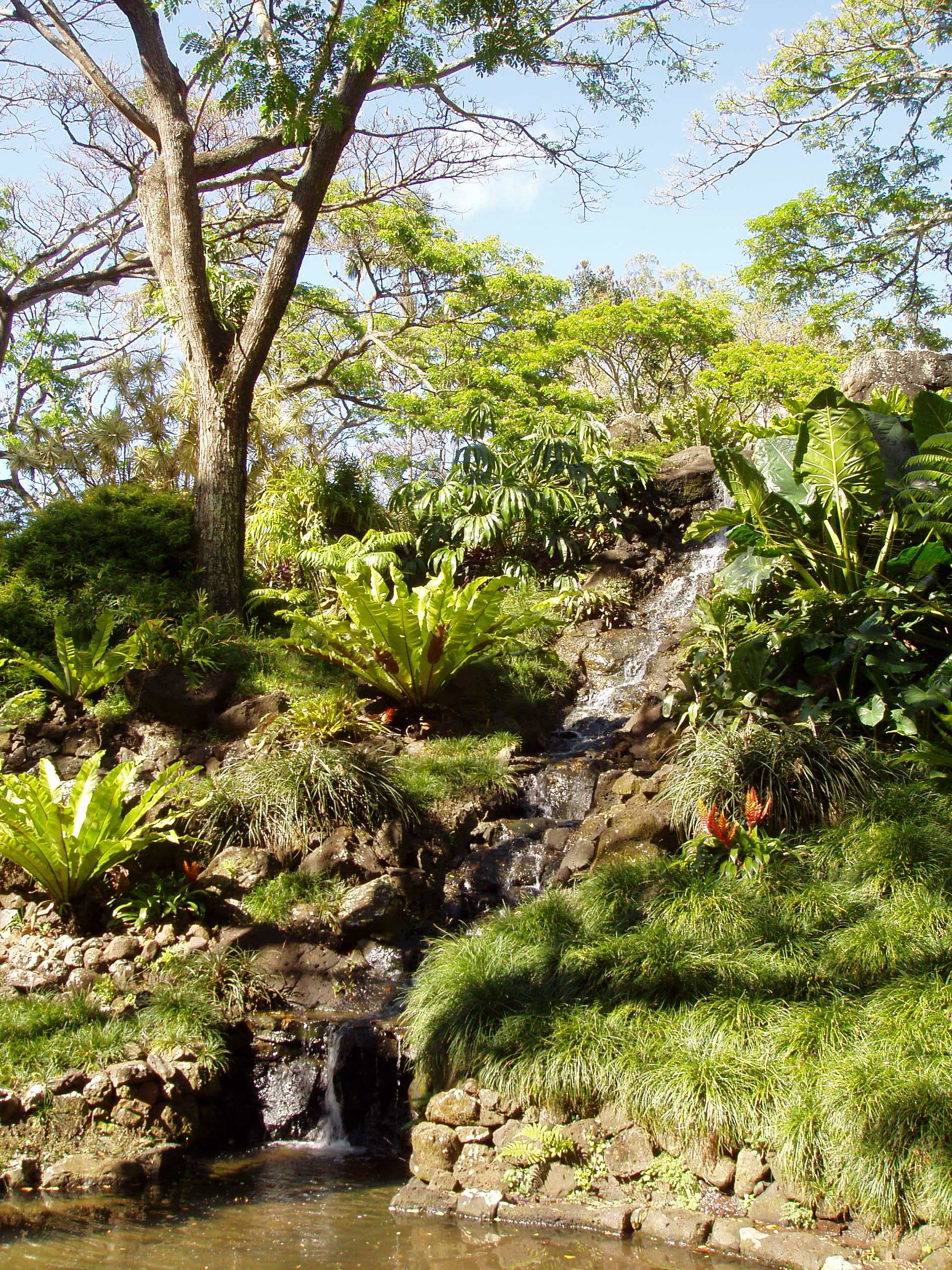
Diana Waterfall (below Diana Fountain)

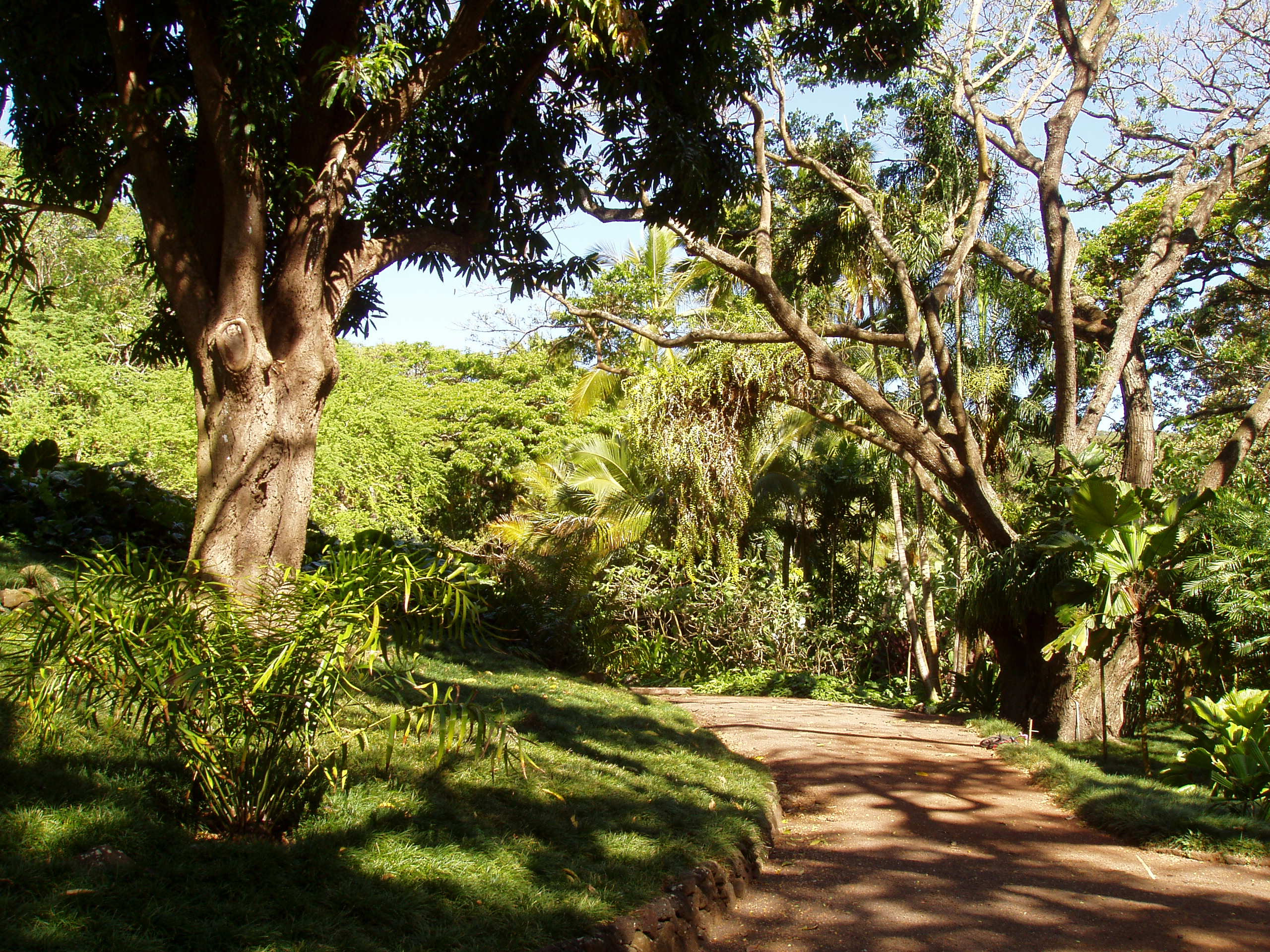
Garden walk

== Films and TV ==
This picturesque setting has been used in a number of films and TV shows, including South Pacific, Donovan's Reef, Jurassic Park, Pirates of the Caribbean, Starsky and Hutch and Magnum, P.I.

== See also ==
- Robert Allerton Park ("The Farms")
- Limahuli Garden and Preserve
- Kahanu Garden
- The Kampong
- List of botanical gardens and arboretums in the United States
- Landscape
