= List of Euphorbiaceae of South Africa =

List of flowering plants in the family Euphorbiaceae recorded from South Africa

Euphorbiaceae, the spurge family, is a large family of flowering plants (anthophytes) in the order Malpighiales. In common English, they are sometimes called euphorbias, which is also the name of a genus in the family. Most spurges are herbs, but some, especially in the tropics, are shrubs or trees. Some are succulent and resemble cacti because of convergent evolution.

23,420 species of vascular plant have been recorded in South Africa, making it the sixth most species-rich country in the world and the most species-rich country on the African continent. Of these, 153 species are considered to be threatened. Nine biomes have been described in South Africa: Fynbos, Succulent Karoo, desert, Nama Karoo, grassland, savanna, Albany thickets, the Indian Ocean coastal belt, and forests.

The 2018 South African National Biodiversity Institute's National Biodiversity Assessment plant checklist lists 35,130 taxa in the phyla Anthocerotophyta (hornworts (6)), Anthophyta (flowering plants (33534)), Bryophyta (mosses (685)), Cycadophyta (cycads (42)), Lycopodiophyta (Lycophytes(45)), Marchantiophyta (liverworts (376)), Pinophyta (conifers (33)), and Pteridophyta (cryptogams (408)).

47 genera are represented in the literature. Listed taxa include species, subspecies, varieties, and forms as recorded, some of which have subsequently been allocated to other taxa as synonyms, in which cases the accepted taxon is appended to the listing. Multiple entries under alternative names reflect taxonomic revision over time.

== Acalypha ==
Genus Acalypha:

- Acalypha angustata Sond. indigenous
- Acalypha capensis (L.f.) Prain & Hutch. indigenous
- Acalypha caperonioides Baill. indigenous
  - Acalypha caperonioides Baill. var. caperonioides, indigenous
  - Acalypha caperonioides Baill. var. galpinii Prain, indigenous
- Acalypha ciliata Forssk. indigenous
- Acalypha depressinerva (Kuntze) K.Schum. indigenous
- Acalypha ecklonii Baill. endemic
- Acalypha fimbriata Schumach. & Thonn. indigenous
- Acalypha glabrata Thunb. indigenous
  - Acalypha glabrata Thunb. var. glabrata, indigenous
  - Acalypha glabrata Thunb. var. pilosa Pax, indigenous
  - Acalypha glabrata Thunb. var. pilosior (Kuntze) Prain, accepted as Acalypha glabrata Thunb. var. pilosa Pax, present
- Acalypha glandulifolia Buchinger ex Meisn. indigenous
- Acalypha indica L. indigenous
  - Acalypha indica L. var. indica, indigenous
- Acalypha ornata Hochst. ex A.Rich. indigenous
- Acalypha peduncularis E.Mey. ex Meisn. indigenous
- Acalypha pubiflora Baill. indigenous
  - Acalypha pubiflora Baill. subsp. pubiflora, indigenous
- Acalypha punctata Meisn. indigenous
  - Acalypha punctata Meisn. var. punctata, indigenous
  - Acalypha punctata Meisn. var. rogersii Prain, indigenous
- Acalypha schinzii Pax, accepted as Acalypha depressinerva (Kuntze) K.Schum. present
- Acalypha segetalis Mull.Arg. indigenous
- Acalypha sonderiana Mull.Arg. indigenous
- Acalypha villicaulis Hochst. indigenous
- Acalypha wilmsii Pax ex Prain & Hutch. indigenous
- Acalypha zeyheri Baill. accepted as Acalypha peduncularis E.Mey. ex Meisn. present

== Adenocline ==
Genus Adenocline:

- Adenocline acuta (Thunb.) Baill. indigenous
- Adenocline pauciflora Turcz. endemic
- Adenocline violifolia (Kuntze) Prain, endemic

== Alchornea ==
Genus Alchornea:

- Alchornea hirtella Benth. indigenous
- Alchornea hirtella Benth. forma glabrata (Mull.Arg.) Pax & K.Hoffm. indigenous
  - Alchornea laxiflora (Benth.) Pax & K.Hoffm. indigenous

== Aleurites ==
Genus Aleurites:

- Aleurites moluccana (L.) Willd. not indigenous, naturalised
  - Aleurites moluccana (L.) Willd. var. moluccana, not indigenous, naturalised

== Anisophyllum ==
Genus Anisophyllum:

- Anisophyllum inaequilaterum (Sond.) Klotzsch & Garcke, accepted as Euphorbia inaequilatera Sond. indigenous
- Anisophyllum mossambicense Klotzsch & Garcke, accepted as Euphorbia mossambicensis (Klotzsch & Garcke) Boiss. indigenous
- Anisophyllum mundii Klotzsch & Garcke, accepted as Euphorbia inaequilatera Sond. indigenous
- Anisophyllum setigerum E.Mey. ex Klotzsch & Garcke, accepted as Euphorbia inaequilatera Sond. indigenous
- Anisophyllum tettense Klotzsch & Garcke, accepted as Euphorbia tettensis Klotzsch, indigenous

== Anthacantha ==
Genus Anthacantha:

- Anthacantha desmetiana Lem. accepted as Euphorbia heptagona L. indigenous

== Arthrothamnus ==
Genus Arthrothamnus:

- Arthrothamnus bergii Klotzsch & Garcke, accepted as Euphorbia burmanni E.Mey. ex Boiss. indigenous
- Arthrothamnus brachiatus E.Mey. ex Klotzsch & Garcke, accepted as Euphorbia rhombifolia Boiss. indigenous
- Arthrothamnus burmanii Klotzsch & Garcke, accepted as Euphorbia burmanni E.Mey. ex Boiss. indigenous
- Arthrothamnus cymosa Klotzsch & Garcke, accepted as Euphorbia tenax Burch. indigenous
- Arthrothamnus densiflorus Klotzsch & Garcke, accepted as Euphorbia rhombifolia Boiss. indigenous
- Arthrothamnus ecklonii Klotzsch & Garcke, accepted as Euphorbia tenax Burch. indigenous
- Arthrothamnus scopiformis Klotzsch & Garcke, accepted as Euphorbia tenax Burch. indigenous

== Breynia ==
Genus Breynia:

- Breynia disticha J.R.Forst. & G.Forst. not indigenous, cultivated, naturalised, invasive

== Caperonia ==
Genus Caperonia:

- Caperonia stuhlmannii Pax, indigenous

== Cavacoa ==
Genus Cavacoa

- Cavacoa aurea (Cavaco) J.Leonard, indigenous

== Cephalocroton ==
Genus Cephalocroton:

- Cephalocroton mollis Klotzsch, indigenous

== Chamaesyce ==
Genus Chamaesyce:

- Chamaesyce glanduligera (Pax) Koutnik, accepted as Euphorbia glanduligera Pax, indigenous
- Chamaesyce hirta (L.) Millsp. accepted as Euphorbia indica Lam. present
- Chamaesyce hypericifolia (L.) Millsp. accepted as Euphorbia hypericifolia L.
- Chamaesyce inaequilatera (Sond.) Sojak, accepted as Euphorbia inaequilatera Sond. present
- Chamaesyce livida (E.Mey. ex Boiss.) Koutnik, accepted as Euphorbia livida E.Mey. ex Boiss. indigenous
- Chamaesyce mossambicensis (Klotzsch & Garcke) Koutnik, accepted as Euphorbia mossambicensis (Klotzsch & Garcke) Boiss. indigenous
- Chamaesyce neopolycnemoides (Pax & K.Hoffm.) Koutnik, accepted as Euphorbia neopolycnemoides Pax & K.Hoffm. indigenous
- Chamaesyce prostrata (Aiton) Small, accepted as Euphorbia prostrata Aiton, not indigenous, naturalised
- Chamaesyce serpens (Kunth) Small, accepted as Euphorbia serpens Kunth, not indigenous, naturalised
- Chamaesyce tettensis (Klotzsch) Koutnik, accepted as Euphorbia tettensis Klotzsch, indigenous
- Chamaesyce zambesiana (Benth.) Koutnik, accepted as Euphorbia zambesiana Benth. var. zambesiana, indigenous

== Chrozophora ==
Genus Chrozophora:

- Chrozophora plicata (Vahl) A.Juss. ex Spreng. indigenous

== Clutia ==
Genus Clutia:

- Clutia abyssinica Jaub. & Spach, indigenous
  - Clutia abyssinica Jaub. & Spach var. abyssinica, indigenous
- Clutia affinis Sond. indigenous
- Clutia africana Poir. endemic
- Clutia alaternoides L. indigenous
  - Clutia alaternoides L. var. alaternoides, endemic
  - Clutia alaternoides L. var. angustifolia E.Mey. ex Sond. endemic
  - Clutia alaternoides L. var. brevifolia E.Mey. ex Sond. endemic
- Clutia alpina Prain, endemic
- Clutia brevifolia Sond. accepted as Clutia polifolia Jacq. present
- Clutia cordata Bernh. endemic
- Clutia daphnoides Lam. endemic
- Clutia disceptata Prain, endemic
- Clutia dregeana Scheele, endemic
- Clutia ericoides Thunb. indigenous
  - Clutia ericoides Thunb. var. ericoides, endemic
  - Clutia ericoides Thunb. var. pachyphylla Prain, endemic
  - Clutia ericoides Thunb. var. tenuis Sond. endemic
- Clutia govaertsii Radcl.-Sm. endemic
- Clutia heterophylla Thunb. indigenous
- Clutia hirsuta (Sond.) Mull.Arg. indigenous
  - Clutia hirsuta (Sond.) Mull.Arg. var. hirsuta, indigenous
  - Clutia hirsuta (Sond.) Mull.Arg. var. robusta Prain, endemic
- Clutia imbricata E.Mey. ex Sond. endemic
- Clutia impedita Prain, endemic
- Clutia katharinae Pax, indigenous
- Clutia laxa Eckl. ex Sond. indigenous
- Clutia marginata E.Mey. ex Sond. endemic
- Clutia monticola S.Moore, indigenous
  - Clutia monticola S.Moore var. monticola, indigenous
- Clutia nana Prain, indigenous
- Clutia natalensis Bernh. indigenous
- Clutia ovalis Sond. endemic
- Clutia platyphylla Pax & K.Hoffm. endemic
- Clutia polifolia Jacq. endemic
- Clutia polygonoides L. endemic
- Clutia pterogona Mull.Arg. endemic
- Clutia pubescens Thunb. endemic
- Clutia pulchella L. indigenous
  - Clutia pulchella L. var. franksiae Prain, endemic
  - Clutia pulchella L. var. obtusata Sond. indigenous
  - Clutia pulchella L. var. pulchella, indigenous
- Clutia rubricaulis Eckl. ex Sond. endemic
  - Clutia rubricaulis Eckl. ex Sond. var. grandifolia Prain, accepted as Clutia rubricaulis Eckl. ex Sond. present
  - Clutia rubricaulis Eckl. ex Sond. var. microphylla Prain, accepted as Clutia rubricaulis Eckl. ex Sond. present
  - Clutia rubricaulis Eckl. ex Sond. var. tenuifolia Prain, accepted as Clutia rubricaulis Eckl. ex Sond. present
- Clutia sericea Mull.Arg. endemic
- Clutia thunbergii Sond. indigenous
- Clutia tomentosa L. endemic
- Clutia vaccinioides (Pax & K.Hoffm.) Prain, accepted as Clutia govaertsii Radcl.-Sm. present
- Clutia virgata Pax & K.Hoffm. indigenous

== Croton ==
Genus Croton:

- Croton bonplandianus Baill. not indigenous, naturalised
- Croton gratissimus Burch. indigenous
  - Croton gratissimus Burch. var. gratissimus, indigenous
  - Croton gratissimus Burch. var. subgratissimus (Prain) Burtt Davy, indigenous
- Croton madandensis S.Moore, indigenous
- Croton megalobotrys Mull.Arg. indigenous
- Croton menyharthii Pax, indigenous
- Croton pseudopulchellus Pax, indigenous
- Croton rivularis Mull.Arg. endemic
- Croton setigerus Hook. not indigenous, naturalised, invasive
- Croton steenkampianus Gerstner, indigenous
- Croton sylvaticus Hochst. indigenous
- Croton zambesicus Mull.Arg. accepted as Croton gratissimus Burch. var. gratissimus, present

== Ctenomeria ==
Genus Ctenomeria:

- Ctenomeria capensis (Thunb.) Harv. ex Sond. accepted as Tragia capensis Thunb. indigenous
- Ctenomeria cordata Harv. accepted as Tragia capensis Thunb. indigenous

== Dactylanthes ==
Genus Dactylanthes:

- Dactylanthes anacantha (Aiton) Haw. accepted as Euphorbia tridentata Lam.
- Dactylanthes globosa Haw. accepted as Euphorbia globosa (Haw.) Sims, indigenous
- Dactylanthes hamata Haw. accepted as Euphorbia hamata (Haw.) Sweet, indigenous
- Dactylanthes patula (Mill.) Haw. accepted as Euphorbia patula Mill. indigenous
- Dactylanthes tuberculata (Jacq.) Haw. accepted as Euphorbia caput-medusae L.

== Dalechampia ==
Genus Dalechampia:

- Dalechampia capensis A.Spreng. indigenous
- Dalechampia galpinii Pax, indigenous
- Dalechampia scandens L. indigenous
  - Dalechampia scandens L. var. natalensis (Mull.Arg.) Pax & K.Hoffm. indigenous
- Dalechampia volubilis E.Mey. ex Baill. accepted as Dalechampia scandens L. var. natalensis (Mull.Arg.) Pax & K.Hoffm. present

== Erythrococca ==
Genus Erythrococca:

- Erythrococca berberidea Prain, indigenous
- Erythrococca menyharthii (Pax) Prain, indigenous
- Erythrococca natalensis Prain, indigenous
- Erythrococca trichogyne (Mull.Arg.) Prain, indigenous
  - Erythrococca trichogyne (Mull.Arg.) Prain var. trichogyne, indigenous

== Euphorbia ==
Genus Euphorbia:

- Euphorbia aequoris N.E.Br. accepted as Euphorbia juttae Dinter, indigenous
- Euphorbia aeruginosa Schweick. indigenous
- Euphorbia aggregata A.Berger, endemic
  - Euphorbia aggregata A.Berger var. alternicolor (N.E.Br.) A.C.White, R.A.Dyer & B.Sloane, accepted as Euphorbia ferox Marloth, endemic
- Euphorbia albanica N.E.Br. endemic
- Euphorbia albertensis N.E.Br. accepted as Euphorbia decepta N.E.Br. endemic
- Euphorbia albipollinifera L.C.Leach, endemic
- Euphorbia albovillosa Pax, accepted as Euphorbia gueinzii Boiss. indigenous
- Euphorbia alternicolor N.E.Br. accepted as Euphorbia ferox Marloth, indigenous
- Euphorbia amarifontana N.E.Br. accepted as Euphorbia rhombifolia Boiss. endemic
- Euphorbia anacantha Aiton, accepted as Euphorbia tridentata Lam.
- Euphorbia angrae N.E.Br. indigenous
- Euphorbia anoplia Stapf, endemic
- Euphorbia arabica Steud. & Hochst. ex Boiss. var. latiappendiculata Pax, accepted as Euphorbia neopolycnemoides Pax & K.Hoffm. indigenous
- Euphorbia arceuthobioides Boiss. accepted as Euphorbia tenax Burch. endemic
- Euphorbia arida N.E.Br. endemic
- Euphorbia armata Thunb. accepted as Euphorbia loricata Lam. indigenous
- Euphorbia arrecta N.E.Br. accepted as Euphorbia tenax Burch. indigenous
- Euphorbia artifolia N.E.Br. accepted as Euphorbia foliosa N.E.Br. endemic
- Euphorbia aspericaulis Pax, accepted as Euphorbia muricata Thunb. endemic
- Euphorbia astrispina N.E.Br. accepted as Euphorbia stellispina Haw. indigenous
- Euphorbia astrophora Marx, accepted as Euphorbia brevirama N.E.Br. var. astrophora (Marx) Marx & Van Veldh. endemic
- Euphorbia atrispina N.E.Br. accepted as Euphorbia heptagona L. indigenous
  - Euphorbia atrispina N.E.Br. var. viridis A.C.White, R.A.Dyer & B.Sloane, accepted as Euphorbia heptagona L. endemic
- Euphorbia avasmontana Dinter, indigenous
  - Euphorbia avasmontana Dinter var. sagittaria (Marloth) A.C.White, R.A.Dyer & B.Sloane, accepted as Euphorbia avasmontana Dinter, indigenous
- Euphorbia bachmannii Pax, accepted as Euphorbia epicyparissias E.Mey. ex Boiss. indigenous
- Euphorbia baliola N.E.Br. accepted as Euphorbia crassipes Marloth
- Euphorbia barnardii A.C.White, R.A.Dyer & B.Sloane, endemic
- Euphorbia basutica Marloth, accepted as Euphorbia clavarioides Boiss.
- Euphorbia baumii Pax, accepted as Euphorbia monteiroi Hook.f.
- Euphorbia bayeri L.C.Leach, accepted as Euphorbia rhombifolia Boiss. endemic
- Euphorbia benguelensis Pax, accepted as Euphorbia trichadenia Pax
- Euphorbia bergii A.C.White, R.A.Dyer & B.Sloane, accepted as Euphorbia davyi N.E.Br. indigenous
- Euphorbia biglandulosa Willd. accepted as Euphorbia burmanni E.Mey. ex Boiss.
- Euphorbia bolusii N.E.Br. accepted as Euphorbia caput-medusae L. endemic
- Euphorbia brachiata (E.Mey. ex Klotzsch & Garcke) Boiss. accepted as Euphorbia rhombifolia Boiss. indigenous
- Euphorbia brakdamensis N.E.Br. endemic
- Euphorbia braunsii N.E.Br. indigenous
- Euphorbia brevirama N.E.Br. endemic
  - Euphorbia brevirama N.E.Br. var. astrophora (Marx) Marx & Van Veldh. endemic
  - Euphorbia brevirama N.E.Br. var. brevirama, endemic
  - Euphorbia brevirama N.E.Br. var. supraterra Marx & Van Veldh. endemic
- Euphorbia bruynsii L.C.Leach, endemic
- Euphorbia bubalina Boiss. endemic
- Euphorbia bupleurifolia Jacq. endemic
- Euphorbia burmanni (Klotzsch ex Garcke) E.Mey. ex Boiss. indigenous
  - Euphorbia burmanni (Klotzsch ex Garcke) E.Mey. ex Boiss. var. karroensis Boiss. accepted as Euphorbia burmanni E.Mey. ex Boiss.
- Euphorbia caerulescens Haw. endemic
- Euphorbia canaliculata Lam. accepted as Euphorbia clava Jacq. indigenous
- Euphorbia canariensis Thunb. accepted as Euphorbia caerulescens Haw. indigenous
- Euphorbia capitosa N.E.Br. accepted as Euphorbia ferox Marloth, indigenous
- Euphorbia caput-medusae L. indigenous
  - Euphorbia caput-medusae L. var. geminata Aiton, accepted as Euphorbia caput-medusae L.
  - Euphorbia caput-medusae L. var. major Aiton, accepted as Euphorbia caput-medusae L.
  - Euphorbia caput-medusae L. var. minor Aiton, accepted as Euphorbia caput-medusae L.
- Euphorbia caterviflora N.E.Br. accepted as Euphorbia rhombifolia Boiss. endemic
- Euphorbia celata R.A.Dyer, endemic
- Euphorbia cereiformis L. endemic
- Euphorbia cervicornis Boiss. accepted as Euphorbia hamata (Haw.) Sweet, indigenous
- Euphorbia chersina N.E.Br. accepted as Euphorbia rhombifolia Boiss. indigenous
- Euphorbia cibdela N.E.Br. accepted as Euphorbia spartaria N.E.Br. indigenous
- Euphorbia clandestina Jacq. endemic
- Euphorbia clava Jacq. endemic
- Euphorbia clavarioides Boiss. indigenous
  - Euphorbia clavarioides Boiss. var. truncata (N.E.Br.) A.C.White, R.A.Dyer & B.Sloane, accepted as Euphorbia clavarioides Boiss. endemic
- Euphorbia clavigera N.E.Br. indigenous
- Euphorbia clivicola R.A.Dyer, endemic
- Euphorbia colliculina A.C.White, R.A.Dyer & B.Sloane, endemic
- Euphorbia commelinii DC. accepted as Euphorbia caput-medusae L.
- Euphorbia commiphoroides Dinter, accepted as Euphorbia guerichiana Pax
- Euphorbia complexa R.A.Dyer, endemic
- Euphorbia confinalis R.A.Dyer, indigenous
  - Euphorbia confinalis R.A.Dyer subsp. confinalis, indigenous
- Euphorbia confluens Nel, accepted as Euphorbia caput-medusae L. endemic
- Euphorbia cooperi N.E.Br. ex A.Berger, indigenous
  - Euphorbia cooperi N.E.Br. ex A.Berger var. cooperi, indigenous
- Euphorbia corifolia Lam. accepted as Euphorbia genistoides P.J.Bergius, indigenous
- Euphorbia coronata Thunb. accepted as Euphorbia clava Jacq.
- Euphorbia corymbosa N.E.Br. accepted as Euphorbia burmanni E.Mey. ex Boiss. endemic
- Euphorbia crassipes Marloth, indigenous
- Euphorbia crispa (Haw.) Sweet, accepted as Euphorbia tuberosa L. endemic
- Euphorbia crotonoides Boiss. indigenous
  - Euphorbia crotonoides Boiss. subsp. crotonoides, indigenous
- Euphorbia cucumerina Willd. accepted as Euphorbia stellispina Haw. var. stellispina, present
- Euphorbia cumulata R.A.Dyer, endemic
- Euphorbia cupularis Boiss. indigenous
- Euphorbia cuspidata Bernh. ex Krauss, accepted as Euphorbia striata Thunb. indigenous
- Euphorbia cyathophora Murray, not indigenous, naturalised
- Euphorbia cylindrica Marloth ex A.C.White, R.A.Dyer & B.Sloane, endemic
- Euphorbia davyi N.E.Br. indigenous
- Euphorbia decepta N.E.Br. endemic
- Euphorbia decussata E.Mey. ex Boiss. accepted as Euphorbia rhombifolia Boiss. indigenous
- Euphorbia discreta N.E.Br. accepted as Euphorbia flanaganii N.E.Br. indigenous
- Euphorbia dregeana E.Mey. ex Boiss. indigenous
- Euphorbia dumosa E.Mey. ex Boiss. accepted as Euphorbia foliosa N.E.Br. indigenous
- Euphorbia duseimata R.A.Dyer, indigenous
- Euphorbia ecklonii (Klotzsch & Garcke) Baill. endemic
- Euphorbia eendornensis Dinter, accepted as Euphorbia crassipes Marloth
- Euphorbia einensis G.Will. accepted as Euphorbia angrae N.E.Br.
  - Euphorbia einensis G.Will. var. anemoarenicola G.Will. accepted as Euphorbia angrae N.E.Br. endemic
- Euphorbia elastica Marloth, accepted as Euphorbia dregeana E.Mey. ex Boiss. indigenous
- Euphorbia elliptica Thunb. accepted as Euphorbia silenifolia (Haw.) Sweet, indigenous
  - Euphorbia elliptica Thunb. var. undulata Boiss. accepted as Euphorbia silenifolia (Haw.) Sweet
- Euphorbia enneagona Haw. accepted as Euphorbia mammillaris L. indigenous
- Euphorbia enopla auct. var. dentata A.Berger, accepted as Euphorbia heptagona L. indigenous
  - Euphorbia enopla Boiss. accepted as Euphorbia heptagona L. indigenous
  - Euphorbia enopla Boiss. var. viridis A.C.White, R.A.Dyer & B.Sloane, accepted as Euphorbia heptagona L. endemic
- Euphorbia enormis N.E.Br. endemic
- Euphorbia ephedroides E.Mey. ex Boiss. indigenous
  - Euphorbia ephedroides E.Mey. ex Boiss. var. debilis L.C.Leach, accepted as Euphorbia ephedroides E.Mey. ex Boiss.
  - Euphorbia ephedroides E.Mey. ex Boiss. var. imminuta L.C.Leach & G.Will. accepted as Euphorbia ephedroides E.Mey. ex Boiss. indigenous
- Euphorbia epicyparissias E.Mey. ex Boiss. indigenous
  - Euphorbia epicyparissias E.Mey. ex Boiss. var. puberula N.E.Br. accepted as Euphorbia epicyparissias E.Mey. ex Boiss. indigenous
  - Euphorbia epicyparissias E.Mey. ex Boiss. var. wahlbergii (Boiss.) N.E.Br. accepted as Euphorbia epicyparissias E.Mey. ex Boiss. indigenous
- Euphorbia ericoides Lam. endemic
- Euphorbia ernestii N.E.Br. accepted as Euphorbia flanaganii N.E.Br. endemic
- Euphorbia erosa Willd. accepted as Euphorbia mammillaris L. indigenous
- Euphorbia erubescens E.Mey. ex Boiss. accepted as Euphorbia kraussiana Bernh. ex Krauss, indigenous
- Euphorbia erythrina Link, endemic
  - Euphorbia erythrina Link var. burchellii Boiss. accepted as Euphorbia erythrina Link, indigenous
  - Euphorbia erythrina Link var. meyeri N.E.Br. accepted as Euphorbia erythrina Link, endemic
- Euphorbia esculenta Marloth, endemic
- Euphorbia espinosa Pax, indigenous
- Euphorbia eustacei N.E.Br. accepted as Euphorbia loricata Lam. endemic
- Euphorbia evansii Pax, accepted as Euphorbia grandidens Haw. indigenous
- Euphorbia excelsa A.C.White, R.A.Dyer & B.Sloane, endemic
- Euphorbia exilis L.C.Leach, endemic
- Euphorbia falsa N.E.Br. accepted as Euphorbia meloformis Aiton, indigenous
- Euphorbia fasciculata Thunb. endemic
- Euphorbia ferox Marloth, endemic
- Euphorbia filiflora Marloth, endemic
  - Euphorbia filiflora Marloth var. nana G.Will. accepted as Euphorbia filiflora Marloth, indigenous
- Euphorbia fimbriata Scop. accepted as Euphorbia mammillaris L. endemic
- Euphorbia flanaganii N.E.Br. endemic
- Euphorbia foliosa N.E.Br. endemic
- Euphorbia forskaolii J.Gay, accepted as Euphorbia austro-occidentalis Thell.
- Euphorbia fortuita A.C.White, R.A.Dyer & B.Sloane, endemic
- Euphorbia francescae L.C.Leach, accepted as Euphorbia quadrata Nel, indigenous
- Euphorbia franckiana A.Berger, endemic
- Euphorbia franksiae N.E.Br. accepted as Euphorbia flanaganii N.E.Br. indigenous
  - Euphorbia franksiae N.E.Br. var. zuluensis A.C.White, R.A.Dyer & B.Sloane, accepted as Euphorbia gerstneriana Bruyns, endemic
- Euphorbia frickiana N.E.Br. accepted as Euphorbia pseudoglobosa Marloth, indigenous
- Euphorbia friedrichiae Dinter, indigenous
- Euphorbia fructus-pini Mill. accepted as Euphorbia caput-medusae L.
  - Euphorbia fructus-pini Mill. var. geminata Sweet, accepted as Euphorbia caput-medusae L.
- Euphorbia frutescens N.E.Br. accepted as Euphorbia guerichiana Pax
- Euphorbia fusca Marloth, accepted as Euphorbia crassipes Marloth, indigenous
- Euphorbia galpinii Pax, accepted as Euphorbia transvaalensis Schltr. indigenous
- Euphorbia gamkensis Marx, accepted as Euphorbia decepta N.E.Br. indigenous
- Euphorbia gariepina Boiss. indigenous
  - Euphorbia gariepina Boiss. subsp. gariepina, indigenous
- Euphorbia gatbergensis N.E.Br. accepted as Euphorbia flanaganii N.E.Br. endemic
- Euphorbia genistoides P.J.Bergius, endemic
  - Euphorbia genistoides P.J.Bergius var. corifolia (Lam.) N.E.Br. accepted as Euphorbia genistoides P.J.Bergius, indigenous
  - Euphorbia genistoides P.J.Bergius var. puberula N.E.Br. accepted as Euphorbia genistoides P.J.Bergius, indigenous
- Euphorbia gentilis N.E.Br. endemic
  - Euphorbia gentilis N.E.Br. subsp. tanquana L.C.Leach, accepted as Euphorbia gentilis N.E.Br. endemic
- Euphorbia gerstneriana Bruyns, endemic
- Euphorbia gilbertii A.Berger, accepted as Euphorbia stellata Willd. indigenous
- Euphorbia glandularis L.C.Leach & G.Will. accepted as Euphorbia exilis L.C.Leach, endemic
- Euphorbia glanduligera Pax, indigenous
- Euphorbia glaucella Pax, accepted as Euphorbia glanduligera Pax
- Euphorbia globosa (Haw.) Sims, endemic
- Euphorbia glomerata A.Berger, accepted as Euphorbia globosa (Haw.) Sims, indigenous
- Euphorbia gorgonis A.Berger, accepted as Euphorbia procumbens Mill. endemic
- Euphorbia gossweileri Pax, accepted as Euphorbia trichadenia Pax
- Euphorbia grandialata R.A.Dyer, endemic
- Euphorbia grandicornis Blanc, indigenous
  - Euphorbia grandicornis Blanc subsp. grandicornis, indigenous
  - Euphorbia grandicornis Goebel, accepted as Euphorbia grandicornis Blanc
  - Euphorbia grandicornis J.Weiss, accepted as Euphorbia grandicornis Blanc
- Euphorbia grandidens Haw. indigenous
- Euphorbia graveolens N.E.Br. accepted as Euphorbia restituta N.E.Br. indigenous
- Euphorbia gregaria Marloth, indigenous
- Euphorbia griseola Pax, indigenous
  - Euphorbia griseola Pax subsp. griseola, indigenous
- Euphorbia groenewaldii R.A.Dyer, endemic
- Euphorbia gueinzii Boiss. indigenous
  - Euphorbia gueinzii Boiss. var. albovillosa (Pax) N.E.Br. accepted as Euphorbia gueinzii Boiss. endemic
- Euphorbia guerichiana Pax, indigenous
- Euphorbia gummifera Boiss. indigenous
- Euphorbia hallii R.A.Dyer, endemic
- Euphorbia hamata (Haw.) Sweet, indigenous
- Euphorbia hastisquama N.E.Br. accepted as Euphorbia rhombifolia Boiss. indigenous
- Euphorbia helioscopia L. not indigenous, naturalised
- Euphorbia heptagona L. endemic
  - Euphorbia heptagona L. var. dentata (A.Berger) N.E.Br. accepted as Euphorbia heptagona L. endemic
  - Euphorbia heptagona L. var. fulvispina A.Berger, accepted as Euphorbia heptagona L.
  - Euphorbia heptagona L. var. ramosa A.C.White, R.A.Dyer & B.Sloane, accepted as Euphorbia heptagona L. endemic
  - Euphorbia heptagona L. var. subsessilis A.C.White, R.A.Dyer & B.Sloane, accepted as Euphorbia heptagona L. endemic
  - Euphorbia heptagona L. var. viridis A.C.White, R.A.Dyer & B.Sloane, accepted as Euphorbia heptagona L. endemic
- Euphorbia hereroensis Pax, accepted as Euphorbia phylloclada Boiss.
- Euphorbia herrei A.C.White, R.A.Dyer & B.Sloane, indigenous
- Euphorbia heterophylla L. not indigenous, naturalised
- Euphorbia hirsuta L. not indigenous, naturalised, invasive
- Euphorbia hirta L. not indigenous, naturalised
- Euphorbia hopetownensis Nel, accepted as Euphorbia crassipes Marloth, endemic
- Euphorbia horrida Boiss. accepted as Euphorbia polygona Haw. indigenous
  - Euphorbia horrida Boiss. var. major A.C.White, R.A.Dyer & B.Sloane, accepted as Euphorbia polygona Haw. endemic
  - Euphorbia horrida Boiss. var. noorsveldensis A.C.White, R.A.Dyer & B.Sloane, accepted as Euphorbia polygona Haw. endemic
  - Euphorbia horrida Boiss. var. striata A.C.White, R.A.Dyer & B.Sloane, accepted as Euphorbia polygona Haw. endemic
- Euphorbia hottentota Marloth, accepted as Euphorbia avasmontana Dinter, indigenous
- Euphorbia huttonae N.E.Br. endemic
- Euphorbia hydnorae E.Mey. ex Boiss. accepted as Euphorbia burmanni E.Mey. ex Boiss. indigenous
- Euphorbia hypericifolia L. not indigenous, naturalised
- Euphorbia hypogaea Marloth, endemic
- Euphorbia hystrix Jacq. accepted as Euphorbia loricata Lam. indigenous
- Euphorbia inaequilatera Sond. indigenous
  - Euphorbia inaequilatera Sond. var. inaequilatera, indigenous
  - Euphorbia inaequilatera Sond. var. perennis N.E.Br. accepted as Euphorbia inaequilatera Sond. indigenous
- Euphorbia indecora N.E.Br. accepted as Euphorbia spartaria N.E.Br. indigenous
- Euphorbia indica Lam. not indigenous, naturalised
- Euphorbia inelegans N.E.Br. accepted as Euphorbia crassipes Marloth, indigenous
- Euphorbia inermis Mill. endemic
  - Euphorbia inermis Mill. var. huttonae (N.E.Br.) A.C.White, R.A.Dyer & B.Sloane, accepted as Euphorbia huttonae N.E.Br. endemic
  - Euphorbia inermis Mill. var. laniglans N.E.Br. accepted as Euphorbia esculenta Marloth, indigenous
- Euphorbia ingens E.Mey. ex Boiss. indigenous
- Euphorbia inornata N.E.Br. accepted as Euphorbia crassipes Marloth, endemic
- Euphorbia involucrata E.Mey. ex Boiss. accepted as Euphorbia epicyparissias E.Mey. ex Boiss. indigenous
  - Euphorbia involucrata E.Mey. ex Boiss. var. megastegia Boiss. accepted as Euphorbia epicyparissias E.Mey. ex Boiss. indigenous
- Euphorbia jansenvillensis Nel, endemic
- Euphorbia juglans Compton, accepted as Euphorbia pseudoglobosa Marloth, endemic
- Euphorbia juttae Dinter, indigenous
- Euphorbia kalaharica Marloth, accepted as Euphorbia avasmontana Dinter, indigenous
- Euphorbia karroensis (Boiss.) N.E.Br. accepted as Euphorbia burmanni E.Mey. ex Boiss. indigenous
- Euphorbia knobelii Letty, endemic
- Euphorbia knuthii Pax, indigenous
  - Euphorbia knuthii Pax subsp. knuthii, indigenous
- Euphorbia kraussiana Bernh. ex Krauss, endemic
  - Euphorbia kraussiana Bernh. ex Krauss var. erubescens (E.Mey. ex Boiss.) N.E.Br. accepted as Euphorbia kraussiana Bernh. ex Krauss, endemic
- Euphorbia kwebensis N.E.Br. accepted as Euphorbia glanduligera Pax
- Euphorbia lathyris L. not indigenous, naturalised
- Euphorbia latimammillaris Croizat, accepted as Euphorbia mammillaris L. indigenous
- Euphorbia laxiflora Kuntze, accepted as Euphorbia bubalina Boiss. indigenous
- Euphorbia ledienii A.Berger, accepted as Euphorbia caerulescens Haw. indigenous
  - Euphorbia ledienii A.Berger var. dregei N.E.Br. accepted as Euphorbia caerulescens Haw. endemic
- Euphorbia leucocephala Lotsy, not indigenous, cultivated, naturalised, invasive
- Euphorbia limpopoana L.C.Leach ex S.Carter, indigenous
- Euphorbia livida E.Mey. ex Boiss. endemic
- Euphorbia lombardensis Nel, accepted as Euphorbia stellata Willd. indigenous
- Euphorbia longibracteata Pax, accepted as Euphorbia monteiroi Hook.f.
- Euphorbia loricata Lam. endemic
- Euphorbia louwii L.C.Leach, endemic
- Euphorbia lugardiae (N.E.Br.) Bruyns, indigenous
- Euphorbia lumbricalis L.C.Leach, accepted as Euphorbia stapelioides Boiss. endemic
- Euphorbia lydenburgensis Schweick. & Letty, endemic
- Euphorbia macella N.E.Br. accepted as Euphorbia burmanni E.Mey. ex Boiss. endemic
- Euphorbia macowani N.E.Br. accepted as Euphorbia caput-medusae L.
- Euphorbia maculata (L.) Small, not indigenous, naturalised, invasive
- Euphorbia maleolens E.Phillips, indigenous
- Euphorbia malevola L.C.Leach subsp. bechuanica L.C.Leach, accepted as Euphorbia limpopoana L.C.Leach ex S.Carter
- Euphorbia mammillaris L. endemic
  - Euphorbia mammillaris L. var. spinosior A.Berger, accepted as Euphorbia mammillaris L. indigenous
  - Euphorbia mammillaris L. var. submammillaris A.Berger, accepted as Euphorbia mammillaris L. indigenous
- Euphorbia marginata Pursh, not indigenous, naturalised
- Euphorbia marientalii Dinter, accepted as Euphorbia braunsii N.E.Br.
- Euphorbia marlothiana N.E.Br. accepted as Euphorbia caput-medusae L. endemic
  - Euphorbia mauritanica L. indigenous
  - Euphorbia mauritanica L. var. corallothamnus Dinter ex A.C.White, R.A.Dyer & B.Sloane, accepted as Euphorbia mauritanica L.
  - Euphorbia mauritanica L. var. foetens Dinter ex A.C.White, R.A.Dyer & B.Sloane, accepted as Euphorbia mauritanica L.
  - Euphorbia mauritanica L. var. lignosa A.C.White, R.A.Dyer & B.Sloane, accepted as Euphorbia mauritanica L. indigenous
  - Euphorbia mauritanica L. var. minor A.C.White, R.A.Dyer & B.Sloane, accepted as Euphorbia mauritanica L. endemic
  - Euphorbia mauritanica L. var. namaquensis N.E.Br. accepted as Euphorbia mauritanica L. indigenous
- Euphorbia medusae Thunb. accepted as Euphorbia caput-medusae L. indigenous
- Euphorbia melanohydrata Nel, indigenous
- Euphorbia melanosticta E.Mey. ex Boiss. accepted as Euphorbia mauritanica L. indigenous
  - Euphorbia meloformis Aiton, endemic
  - Euphorbia meloformis Aiton subsp. meloformis forma falsa, accepted as Euphorbia meloformis Aiton, endemic
  - Euphorbia meloformis Aiton subsp. meloformis var. magna, accepted as Euphorbia meloformis Aiton, indigenous
  - Euphorbia meloformis Aiton subsp. valida (N.E.Br.) G.D.Rowley, accepted as Euphorbia meloformis Aiton, endemic
  - Euphorbia meloformis Aiton var. pomiformis (Thunb.) Marloth, accepted as Euphorbia meloformis Aiton, indigenous
  - Euphorbia meloformis Aiton var. prolifera Frick, accepted as Euphorbia meloformis Aiton, indigenous
- Euphorbia meyeri Boiss. accepted as Euphorbia erythrina Link, indigenous
  - Euphorbia meyeri Nel, accepted as Euphorbia filiflora Marloth, indigenous
- Euphorbia micracantha Boiss. accepted as Euphorbia stellata Willd. endemic
- Euphorbia mira L.C.Leach, accepted as Euphorbia silenifolia (Haw.) Sweet, endemic
- Euphorbia miscella L.C.Leach, accepted as Euphorbia celata R.A.Dyer, indigenous
- Euphorbia mixta N.E.Br. accepted as Euphorbia tenax Burch. endemic
- Euphorbia monteiroi Hook.f. indigenous
  - Euphorbia monteiroi Hook.f. subsp. ramosa L.C.Leach, indigenous
- Euphorbia morinii A.Berger, accepted as Euphorbia heptagona L. indigenous
- Euphorbia mossambicensis (Klotzsch & Garcke) Boiss. indigenous
- Euphorbia muirii N.E.Br. accepted as Euphorbia caput-medusae L. endemic
- Euphorbia multiceps A.Berger, endemic
- Euphorbia multifida N.E.Br. endemic
- Euphorbia multifolia A.C.White, R.A.Dyer & B.Sloane, endemic
- Euphorbia multiramosa Nel, accepted as Euphorbia namaquensis N.E.Br. present
- Euphorbia mundii N.E.Br. accepted as Euphorbia rhombifolia Boiss. indigenous
- Euphorbia muraltioides N.E.Br. endemic
- Euphorbia muricata Thunb. endemic
- Euphorbia namaquensis N.E.Br. indigenous
- Euphorbia natalensis Bernh. ex Krauss, indigenous
- Euphorbia nelii A.C.White, R.A.Dyer & B.Sloane, accepted as Euphorbia filiflora Marloth, indigenous
- Euphorbia nelsii Pax, accepted as Euphorbia inaequilatera Sond.
- Euphorbia neopolycnemoides Pax & K.Hoffm. indigenous
- Euphorbia nesemannii R.A.Dyer, endemic
- Euphorbia nutans Lag. not indigenous, naturalised
- Euphorbia obesa Hook.f. endemic
  - Euphorbia obesa Hook.f. subsp. symmetrica (A.C.White, R.A.Dyer & B.Sloane) G.D.Rowley, accepted as Euphorbia obesa Hook.f. indigenous
- Euphorbia ornithopus Jacq. accepted as Euphorbia tridentata Lam. var. ornithopus (Jacq.) Van Veldh. & Lawant, endemic
- Euphorbia ovata (E.Mey. ex Klotzsch & Garcke) Boiss. accepted as Euphorbia sclerophylla Boiss. indigenous
- Euphorbia oxystegia Boiss. endemic
- Euphorbia parvifolia E.Mey. ex Boiss. accepted as Euphorbia inaequilatera Sond. indigenous
  - Euphorbia parvifolia E.Mey. ex Boiss. var. laxa Boiss. accepted as Euphorbia inaequilatera Sond.
- Euphorbia passa N.E.Br. accepted as Euphorbia flanaganii N.E.Br. indigenous
- Euphorbia patula Mill. endemic
- Euphorbia paxiana Dinter, accepted as Euphorbia mauritanica L.
- Euphorbia pedemontana L.C.Leach, endemic
- Euphorbia peltigera E.Mey. ex Boiss. accepted as Euphorbia hamata (Haw.) Sweet, indigenous
- Euphorbia pentagona Haw. endemic
- Euphorbia pentops Marloth ex A.C.White, R.A.Dyer & B.Sloane, endemic
- Euphorbia peplus L. not indigenous, naturalised
- Euphorbia perangusta R.A.Dyer, endemic
- Euphorbia perpera N.E.Br. accepted as Euphorbia rhombifolia Boiss. endemic
- Euphorbia persistens R.A.Dyer, accepted as Euphorbia clavigera N.E.Br. indigenous
- Euphorbia pfeilii Pax, accepted as Euphorbia glanduligera Pax, indigenous
- Euphorbia phylloclada Boiss. indigenous
- Euphorbia phymatoclada Boiss. accepted as Euphorbia burmanni E.Mey. ex Boiss. indigenous
- Euphorbia pillansii N.E.Br. endemic
  - Euphorbia pillansii N.E.Br. var. albovirens A.C.White, R.A.Dyer & B.Sloane, accepted as Euphorbia pillansii N.E.Br. endemic
  - Euphorbia pillansii N.E.Br. var. ramosissima A.C.White, R.A.Dyer & B.Sloane, accepted as Euphorbia pillansii N.E.Br. endemic
- Euphorbia pistiifolia Boiss. accepted as Euphorbia ecklonii (Klotzsch & Garcke) Baill. indigenous
- Euphorbia planiceps A.C.White, R.A.Dyer & B.Sloane, accepted as Euphorbia wilmaniae Marloth, endemic
- Euphorbia platymammillaris Croizat, accepted as Euphorbia mammillaris L. indigenous
- Euphorbia polycephala Marloth, endemic
- Euphorbia polygona Haw. endemic
  - Euphorbia polygona Haw. var. alba D.H.Schnabel, accepted as Euphorbia polygona Haw. endemic
  - Euphorbia polygona Haw. var. ambigua D.H.Schnabel, accepted as Euphorbia polygona Haw. endemic
  - Euphorbia polygona Haw. var. exilis Schnabel, accepted as Euphorbia polygona Haw. indigenous
  - Euphorbia polygona Haw. var. horrida (Boiss.) D.H.Schnabel forma alba, accepted as Euphorbia polygona Haw. indigenous
  - Euphorbia polygona Haw. var. minor D.H.Schnabel, accepted as Euphorbia polygona Haw. endemic
  - Euphorbia polygona Haw. var. nivea Schnabel, accepted as Euphorbia polygona Haw. indigenous
- Euphorbia pomiformis Thunb. accepted as Euphorbia meloformis Aiton, indigenous
- Euphorbia procumbens Meerb. accepted as Euphorbia stellata Willd.
  - Euphorbia procumbens Mill. endemic
- Euphorbia prostrata Aiton, not indigenous, naturalised
- Euphorbia proteifolia Boiss. accepted as Euphorbia bupleurifolia Jacq. indigenous
- Euphorbia pseudocactus A.Berger, endemic
- Euphorbia pseudoduseimata A.C.White, R.A.Dyer & B.Sloane, accepted as Euphorbia davyi N.E.Br. indigenous
- Euphorbia pseudoglobosa Marloth, endemic
- Euphorbia pseudohypogaea Dinter, accepted as Euphorbia davyi N.E.Br.
- Euphorbia pseudotuberosa Pax, indigenous
- Euphorbia pubiglans N.E.Br. accepted as Euphorbia clava Jacq. endemic
- Euphorbia pugniformis Boiss. accepted as Euphorbia procumbens Mill. endemic
- Euphorbia pulcherrima Willd. ex Klotzsch, not indigenous, naturalised
- Euphorbia pulvinata Marloth, indigenous
- Euphorbia pyriformis N.E.Br. accepted as Euphorbia meloformis Aiton, indigenous
- Euphorbia quadrata Nel, endemic
- Euphorbia racemosa E.Mey. ex Boiss. accepted as Euphorbia spartaria N.E.Br. indigenous
- Euphorbia radiata E.Mey. ex Boiss. accepted as Euphorbia restituta N.E.Br.
  - Euphorbia radiata Thunb. accepted as Euphorbia stellata Willd. indigenous
- Euphorbia radyeri Bruyns, endemic
- Euphorbia ramiglans N.E.Br. accepted as Euphorbia caput-medusae L. endemic
- Euphorbia rangeana Dinter, accepted as Euphorbia braunsii N.E.Br.
- Euphorbia rectirama N.E.Br. accepted as Euphorbia spartaria N.E.Br. indigenous
- Euphorbia restituta N.E.Br. endemic
- Euphorbia restricta R.A.Dyer, endemic
- Euphorbia rhombifolia Boiss. indigenous
  - Euphorbia rhombifolia Boiss. var. cymosa N.E.Br. accepted as Euphorbia tenax Burch. indigenous
  - Euphorbia rhombifolia Boiss. var. laxa N.E.Br. accepted as Euphorbia spartaria N.E.Br. indigenous
  - Euphorbia rhombifolia Boiss. var. triceps N.E.Br. accepted as Euphorbia spartaria N.E.Br. indigenous
- Euphorbia rowlandii R.A.Dyer, indigenous
- Euphorbia rudis N.E.Br. accepted as Euphorbia braunsii N.E.Br. indigenous
- Euphorbia rudolfii N.E.Br. accepted as Euphorbia rhombifolia Boiss. indigenous
- Euphorbia ruscifolia (Boiss.) N.E.Br. endemic
- Euphorbia sagittaria Marloth, accepted as Euphorbia avasmontana Dinter, indigenous
- Euphorbia sanguinea Hochst. & Steud. ex Boiss. var. natalensis Boiss. accepted as Euphorbia inaequilatera Sond. indigenous
  - Euphorbia sanguinea Hochst. & Steud. ex Boiss. var. setigera E.Mey. ex Boiss. accepted as Euphorbia inaequilatera Sond. indigenous
- Euphorbia sarcostemmatoides Dinter, accepted as Euphorbia mauritanica L.
- Euphorbia schinzii Pax, indigenous
- Euphorbia schoenlandii Pax, endemic
- Euphorbia sclerophylla Boiss. endemic
  - Euphorbia sclerophylla Boiss. var. myrtifolia E.Mey. ex Boiss. accepted as Euphorbia sclerophylla Boiss. indigenous
  - Euphorbia sclerophylla Boiss. var. puberula N.E.Br. accepted as Euphorbia sclerophylla Boiss. indigenous
  - Euphorbia sclerophylla Boiss. var. ruscifolia Boiss. accepted as Euphorbia ruscifolia (Boiss.) N.E.Br. indigenous
- Euphorbia scopoliana Steud. accepted as Euphorbia mammillaris L. indigenous
- Euphorbia sekukuniensis R.A.Dyer, endemic
- Euphorbia serpens Kunth, not indigenous, naturalised
- Euphorbia serpiformis Boiss. accepted as Euphorbia tenax Burch. indigenous
- Euphorbia serrata L. not indigenous, naturalised
- Euphorbia silenifolia (Haw.) Sweet, endemic
- Euphorbia siliciicola Dinter, accepted as Euphorbia juttae Dinter
- Euphorbia similis A.Berger, accepted as Euphorbia ingens E.Mey. ex Boiss. indigenous
- Euphorbia spartaria N.E.Br. indigenous
- Euphorbia spicata E.Mey. ex Boiss. accepted as Euphorbia muricata Thunb. endemic
- Euphorbia spinea N.E.Br. indigenous
- Euphorbia squarrosa Haw. accepted as Euphorbia stellata Willd. endemic
- Euphorbia stapelioides Boiss. indigenous
- Euphorbia stegmatica Nel, accepted as Euphorbia quadrata Nel, indigenous
- Euphorbia stellata Willd. endemic
  - Euphorbia stellispina Haw. endemic
  - Euphorbia stellispina Haw. var. astrispina (N.E.Br.) A.C.White, R.A.Dyer & B.Sloane, accepted as Euphorbia stellispina Haw. endemic
- Euphorbia stolonifera Marloth ex A.C.White, R.A.Dyer & B.Sloane, endemic
- Euphorbia striata Thunb. indigenous
  - Euphorbia striata Thunb. var. brachyphylla Boiss. accepted as Euphorbia sclerophylla Boiss. indigenous
  - Euphorbia striata Thunb. var. cuspidata Boiss. accepted as Euphorbia striata Thunb. endemic
- Euphorbia subfalcata Hiern, accepted as Euphorbia trichadenia Pax
- Euphorbia submammillaris (A.Berger) A.Berger, indigenous
- Euphorbia suffulta Bruyns, endemic
- Euphorbia superans Nel ex Herre, accepted as Euphorbia huttonae N.E.Br. present
- Euphorbia suppressa Marx, accepted as Euphorbia decepta N.E.Br. indigenous
- Euphorbia susannae Marloth, endemic
- Euphorbia symmetrica A.C.White, R.A.Dyer & B.Sloane, accepted as Euphorbia obesa Hook.f. indigenous
- Euphorbia tenax Burch. endemic
- Euphorbia terracina L. not indigenous, naturalised, invasive
- Euphorbia tessellata (Haw.) Sweet, accepted as Euphorbia caput-medusae L.
- Euphorbia tetragona Haw. endemic
- Euphorbia tettensis Klotzsch, indigenous
- Euphorbia tirucalli L. indigenous
- Euphorbia tithymaloides L. subsp. smallii (Millsp.) V.W.Steinm. not indigenous, naturalised
- Euphorbia tortirama R.A.Dyer, endemic
- Euphorbia transvaalensis Schltr. indigenous
- Euphorbia triangularis Desf. ex A.Berger, indigenous
  - Euphorbia trichadenia Pax, indigenous
  - Euphorbia trichadenia Pax var. gibbsiae N.E.Br. accepted as Euphorbia trichadenia Pax
- Euphorbia tridentata Lam. endemic
  - Euphorbia tridentata Lam. var. ornithopus (Jacq.) Van Veldh. & Lawant, endemic
  - Euphorbia tridentata Lam. var. tridentata, endemic
- Euphorbia truncata N.E.Br. accepted as Euphorbia clavarioides Boiss. indigenous
- Euphorbia tuberculata Jacq. accepted as Euphorbia caput-medusae L. indigenous
  - Euphorbia tuberculata Jacq. var. macowani (N.E.Br.) A.C.White, R.A.Dyer & B.Sloane, accepted as Euphorbia caput-medusae L. endemic
- Euphorbia tuberculatoides N.E.Br. accepted as Euphorbia caput-medusae L. indigenous
- Euphorbia tuberosa L. endemic
- Euphorbia tubiglans Marloth ex R.A.Dyer, accepted as Euphorbia jansenvillensis Nel, endemic
- Euphorbia tugelensis N.E.Br. endemic
- Euphorbia umfoloziensis Peckover, endemic
- Euphorbia uncinata DC. accepted as Euphorbia stellata Willd. indigenous
- Euphorbia vaalputsiana L.C.Leach, accepted as Euphorbia gentilis N.E.Br. endemic
- Euphorbia valida N.E.Br. accepted as Euphorbia meloformis Aiton, indigenous
- Euphorbia vandermerwei R.A.Dyer, endemic
- Euphorbia venenata Marloth, accepted as Euphorbia avasmontana Dinter
- Euphorbia versicolores G.Will. accepted as Euphorbia filiflora Marloth, endemic
- Euphorbia virosa Willd. indigenous
  - Euphorbia virosa Willd. subsp. virosa, indigenous
  - Euphorbia virosa Willd. var. caerulescens (Haw.) A.Berger, accepted as Euphorbia caerulescens Haw. indigenous
- Euphorbia volkmanniae Dinter, accepted as Euphorbia avasmontana Dinter
- Euphorbia wahlbergii Boiss. accepted as Euphorbia epicyparissias E.Mey. ex Boiss. indigenous
- Euphorbia waterbergensis R.A.Dyer, endemic
- Euphorbia wilmaniae Marloth, endemic
- Euphorbia woodii N.E.Br. accepted as Euphorbia flanaganii N.E.Br. endemic
- Euphorbia x bothae Lotsy & Goddijn, endemic
- Euphorbia x curvirama R.A.Dyer, endemic
- Euphorbia x inconstantia R.A.Dyer, endemic
- Euphorbia zambesiana Benth. indigenous
  - Euphorbia zambesiana Benth. var. zambesiana, indigenous
- Euphorbia zoutpansbergensis R.A.Dyer, endemic

== Excoecaria ==
Genus Excoecaria:

- Excoecaria simii (Kuntze) Pax, endemic

== Galarhoeus ==
Genus Galarhoeus:

- Galarhoeus genistoides (P.J.Bergius) Haw. accepted as Euphorbia genistoides P.J.Bergius, indigenous

== Homalanthus ==
Genus Homalanthus:

- Homalanthus populifolius Graham, not indigenous, naturalised, invasive

== Jatropha ==
Genus Jatropha:

- Jatropha capensis (L.f.) Sond. endemic
- Jatropha curcas L. not indigenous, cultivated, naturalised, invasive
- Jatropha erythropoda Pax & K.Hoffm. indigenous
- Jatropha gossypiifolia L. not indigenous, naturalised
  - Jatropha gossypiifolia L. var. elegans (Pohl) Mull.Arg. not indigenous, naturalised, invasive
- Jatropha hirsuta Hochst. indigenous
  - Jatropha hirsuta Hochst. var. glabrescens (Pax & K.Hoffm.) Prain, endemic
  - Jatropha hirsuta Hochst. var. hirsuta, endemic
  - Jatropha hirsuta Hochst. var. oblongifolia Prain, indigenous
- Jatropha lagarinthoides Sond. endemic
- Jatropha latifolia Pax, indigenous
  - Jatropha latifolia Pax var. angustata Prain, endemic
  - Jatropha latifolia Pax var. latifolia, endemic
  - Jatropha latifolia Pax var. swazica Prain, indigenous
- Jatropha multifida L. not indigenous, naturalised
- Jatropha natalensis Mull.Arg. endemic
- Jatropha orangeana Dinter ex P.G.Mey. indigenous
- Jatropha podagrica Hook. not indigenous, naturalised
- Jatropha pseudoglandulifera Pax, accepted as Jatropha spicata Pax
- Jatropha schlechteri Pax, indigenous
  - Jatropha schlechteri Pax subsp. schlechteri, indigenous
  - Jatropha schlechteri Pax subsp. setifera (Hutch.) Radcl.-Sm. indigenous
- Jatropha spicata Pax, indigenous
- Jatropha variifolia Pax, indigenous
- Jatropha woodii Kuntze, endemic
- Jatropha zeyheri Sond. indigenous
  - Jatropha zeyheri Sond. var. platyphylla Pax, accepted as Jatropha zeyheri Sond. present
  - Jatropha zeyheri Sond. var. subsimplex Prain, accepted as Jatropha zeyheri Sond. present

== Leidesia ==
Genus Leidesia:

- Leidesia procumbens (L.) Prain, indigenous

== Macaranga ==
Genus Macaranga:

- Macaranga capensis (Baill.) Benth. ex Sim, indigenous
  - Macaranga capensis (Baill.) Benth. ex Sim var. capensis, indigenous

== Manihot ==
Genus Manihot:

- Manihot dichotoma Ule, not indigenous, naturalised
- Manihot dulcis (J.F.Gmel.) Pax, accepted as Manihot esculenta Crantz, not indigenous, naturalised
- Manihot esculenta Crantz, not indigenous, cultivated, naturalised
- Manihot glaziovii Mull.Arg. not indigenous, naturalised

== Medusea ==
Genus Medusea:

- Medusea fructus-pini (Mill.) Haw. accepted as Euphorbia caput-medusae L.
- Medusea globosa (Haw.) Klotzsch & Garcke, accepted as Euphorbia globosa (Haw.) Sims, indigenous
- Medusea hamata (Haw.) Klotzsch & Garcke, accepted as Euphorbia hamata (Haw.) Sweet, indigenous
- Medusea major Haw. accepted as Euphorbia caput-medusae L.
- Medusea patula (Mill.) Klotzsch & Garcke, accepted as Euphorbia patula Mill. indigenous
- Medusea procumbens (Mill.) Haw. accepted as Euphorbia procumbens Mill. indigenous
- Medusea tessellata Haw. accepted as Euphorbia caput-medusae L.
- Medusea tridentata (Lam.) Klotzsch & Garcke, accepted as Euphorbia tridentata Lam. indigenous
- Medusea tuberculata (Jacq.) Klotzsch & Garcke, accepted as Euphorbia caput-medusae L.

== Mercurialis ==
Genus Mercurialis:

- Mercurialis annua L. not indigenous, naturalised, invasive

== Micrococca ==
Genus Micrococca:

- Micrococca capensis (Baill.) Prain, indigenous

== Monadenium ==
Genus Monadenium:

- Monadenium lugardiae N.E.Br. accepted as Euphorbia lugardiae (N.E.Br.) Bruyns, indigenous

== Pedilanthus ==
Genus Pedilanthus:

- Pedilanthus smallii Millsp. accepted as Euphorbia tithymaloides L. subsp. smallii (Millsp.) V.W.Steinm. not indigenous, naturalised
- Pedilanthus tithymaloides (L.) A.Poit. subsp. smallii (Millsp.) Dressler, accepted as Euphorbia tithymaloides L. subsp. smallii (Millsp.) V.W.Steinm. not indigenous, naturalised

== Pterococcus ==
Genus Pterococcus:

- Pterococcus africanus (Sond.) Pax & K.Hoffm. accepted as Plukenetia africana Sond. present

== Ricinus ==
Genus Ricinus:

- Ricinus communis L. accepted as Ricinus communis L. var. communis, not indigenous, naturalised, invasive
  - Ricinus communis L. var. communis, not indigenous, cultivated, naturalised, invasive

== Sapium ==
Genus Sapium:

- Sapium ellipticum (Hochst.) Pax, accepted as Shirakiopsis elliptica (Hochst.) Esser, present
- Sapium integerrimum (Hochst.) J.Leonard, accepted as Sclerocroton integerrimus Hochst. present

== Schinziophyton ==
Genus Schinziophyton:

- Schinziophyton rautanenii (Schinz) Radcl.-Sm. indigenous

== Sclerocroton ==
Genus Sclerocroton:

- Sclerocroton integerrimus Hochst. indigenous

== Seidelia ==
Genus Seidelia:

- Seidelia pumila (Sond.) Baill. endemic
- Seidelia triandra (E.Mey.) Pax, indigenous

== Shirakiopsis ==
Genus Shirakiopsis:

- Shirakiopsis elliptica (Hochst.) Esser, indigenous

== Spirostachys ==
Genus Spirostachys:

- Spirostachys africana Sond. indigenous

== Suregada ==
Genus Suregada:

- Suregada africana (Sond.) Kuntze, indigenous
- Suregada procera (Prain) Croizat, indigenous
- Suregada zanzibariensis Baill. indigenous

== Synadenium ==
Genus Synadenium:

- Synadenium cupulare (Boiss.) L.C.Wheeler ex A.C.White, R.A.Dyer & B.Sloane, accepted as Euphorbia cupularis Boiss. indigenous

== Tithymalus ==
Genus Tithymalus:

- Tithymalus apiculatus Klotzsch & Garcke, accepted as Euphorbia erythrina Link, indigenous
- Tithymalus attenuatus Klotzsch & Garcke, accepted as Euphorbia silenifolia (Haw.) Sweet, indigenous
- Tithymalus bergii Klotzsch & Garcke, accepted as Euphorbia silenifolia (Haw.) Sweet, indigenous
- Tithymalus brachypus Klotzsch & Garcke, accepted as Euphorbia mauritanica L. indigenous
- Tithymalus capensis Klotzsch & Garcke, accepted as Euphorbia natalensis Bernh. ex Krauss, indigenous
- Tithymalus confertus Klotzsch & Garcke, accepted as Euphorbia erythrina Link
- Tithymalus crispus Haw. accepted as Euphorbia tuberosa L. indigenous
- Tithymalus ecklonii Klotzsch & Garcke, accepted as Euphorbia ecklonii (Klotzsch & Garcke) Baill. indigenous
- Tithymalus ellipticus (Thunb.) Klotzsch & Garcke, accepted as Euphorbia silenifolia (Haw.) Sweet, indigenous
- Tithymalus epicyparissias E.Mey. ex Klotzsch & Garcke, accepted as Euphorbia epicyparissias E.Mey. ex Boiss. indigenous
- Tithymalus erythrinus (Link) Klotzsch & Garcke, accepted as Euphorbia erythrina Link, indigenous
- Tithymalus foliosus Klotzsch & Garcke, accepted as Euphorbia foliosa N.E.Br. indigenous
- Tithymalus genistoides (P.J.Bergius) Klotzsch & Garcke, accepted as Euphorbia genistoides P.J.Bergius, indigenous
- Tithymalus involucratus Klotzsch & Garcke, accepted as Euphorbia epicyparissias E.Mey. ex Boiss. indigenous
- Tithymalus longipetiolatus Klotzsch & Garcke, accepted as Euphorbia silenifolia (Haw.) Sweet, indigenous
- Tithymalus mauritanicus (L.) Haw. accepted as Euphorbia mauritanica L. indigenous
- Tithymalus meyeri Klotzsch & Garcke, accepted as Euphorbia kraussiana Bernh. ex Krauss, indigenous
- Tithymalus multicaulis Klotzsch & Garcke, accepted as Euphorbia sclerophylla Boiss. indigenous
- Tithymalus ovatus E.Mey. ex Klotzsch & Garcke, accepted as Euphorbia sclerophylla Boiss. indigenous
- Tithymalus revolutus Klotzsch & Garcke, accepted as Euphorbia genistoides P.J.Bergius, indigenous
- Tithymalus straitus (Thunb.) Klotzsch & Garcke, accepted as Euphorbia striata Thunb. indigenous
- Tithymalus truncatus Klotzsch & Garcke, accepted as Euphorbia kraussiana Bernh. ex Krauss, indigenous
- Tithymalus tuberosus (L.) Hill, accepted as Euphorbia tuberosa L. indigenous
- Tithymalus zeyheri Klotzsch & Garcke, accepted as Euphorbia mauritanica L. indigenous

== Tragia ==
Genus Tragia:

- Tragia capensis Thunb. indigenous
- Tragia collina Prain, endemic
- Tragia cordata (Harv.) Burtt Davy, accepted as Tragia capensis Thunb. indigenous
- Tragia dioica Sond. indigenous
- Tragia glabrata (Mull.Arg.) Pax & K.Hoffm. indigenous
  - Tragia glabrata (Mull.Arg.) Pax & K.Hoffm. var. glabrata, indigenous
- Tragia incisifolia Prain, indigenous
- Tragia kirkiana Mull.Arg. indigenous
- Tragia meyeriana Mull.Arg. indigenous
- Tragia minor Sond. indigenous
- Tragia okanyua Pax, indigenous
- Tragia physocarpa Prain, indigenous
- Tragia prionoides Radcl.-Sm. indigenous
- Tragia rogersii Prain, endemic
- Tragia rupestris Sond. indigenous
- Tragia sonderi Prain, indigenous
- Tragia wahlbergiana Prain, endemic

== Tragiella ==
Genus Tragiella:

- Tragiella natalensis (Sond.) Pax & K.Hoffm. indigenous

== Treisia ==
Genus Treisia:

- Treisia hystrix (Jacq.) Haw. accepted as Euphorbia loricata Lam. indigenous
- Treisia tuberculata Haw. accepted as Euphorbia clava Jacq.

== Vernicia ==
Genus Vernicia:

- Vernicia fordii (Hemsl.) Airy Shaw, not indigenous, naturalised
- Vernicia montana Lour. not indigenous, naturalised
