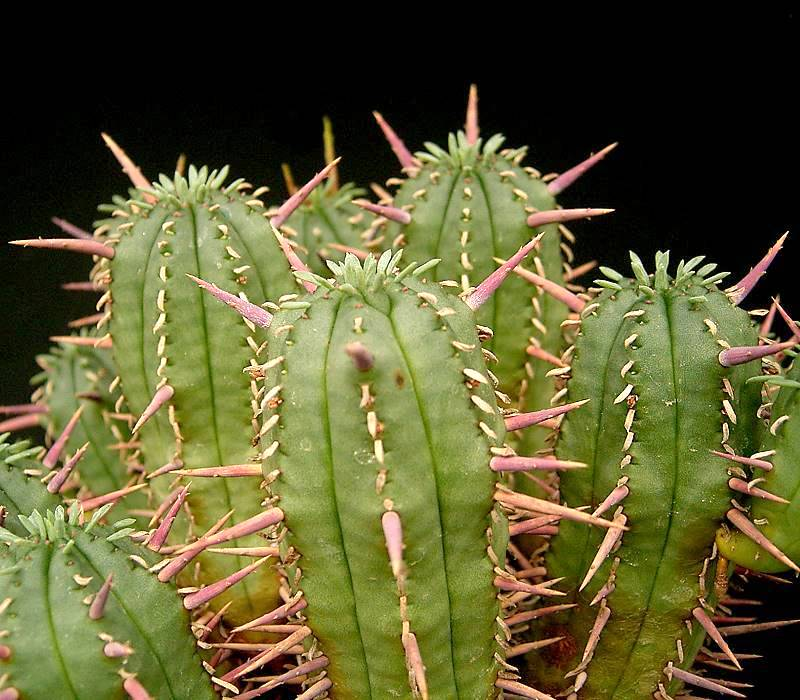
- Close-up of leaves and spines
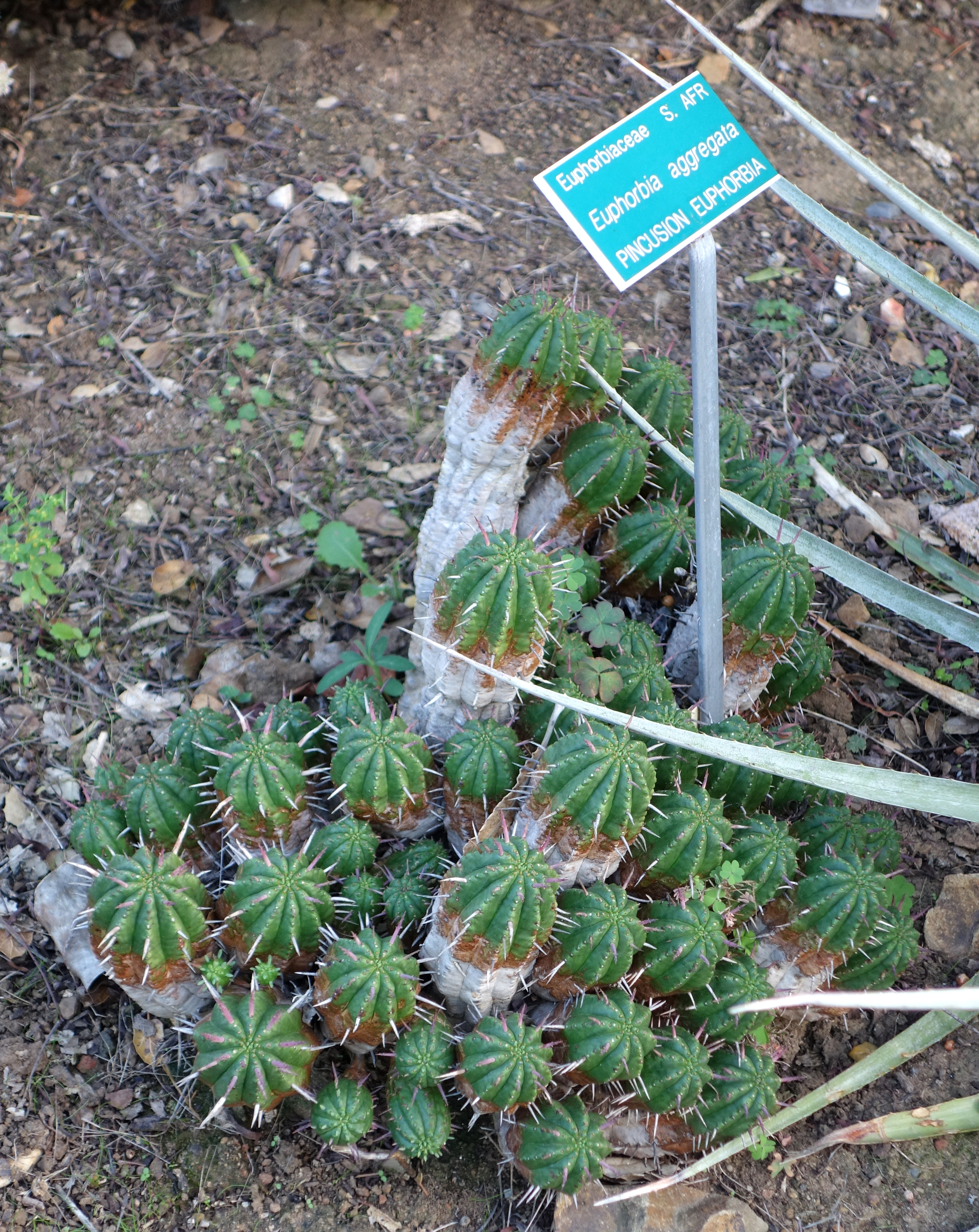
- At the San Luis Obispo Botanical Garden

Scientific classification
- Kingdom: Plantae
- Clade: Embryophytes
- Clade: Tracheophytes
- Clade: Angiosperms
- Clade: Eudicots
- Clade: Rosids
- Order: Malpighiales
- Family: Euphorbiaceae
- Genus: Euphorbia
- Species: E. aggregata

Binomial name
- Euphorbia aggregata A.Berger

= Euphorbia aggregata =

Species of flowering plant

Euphorbia aggregata, the pincushion, is a species of flowering plant in the family Euphorbiaceae. It is native to the Eastern Cape province of South Africa. A succulent subshrub, very variable in color and form, it is typically found in deserts and dry scrublands. It is a close relative of Euphorbia ferox and E. pulvinata. Kept as an ornamental by succulent enthusiasts, it eventually forms cushions, with the oldest wild individuals exceeding 1 m (3 ft) in diameter and sporting up to 40,000 heads.
