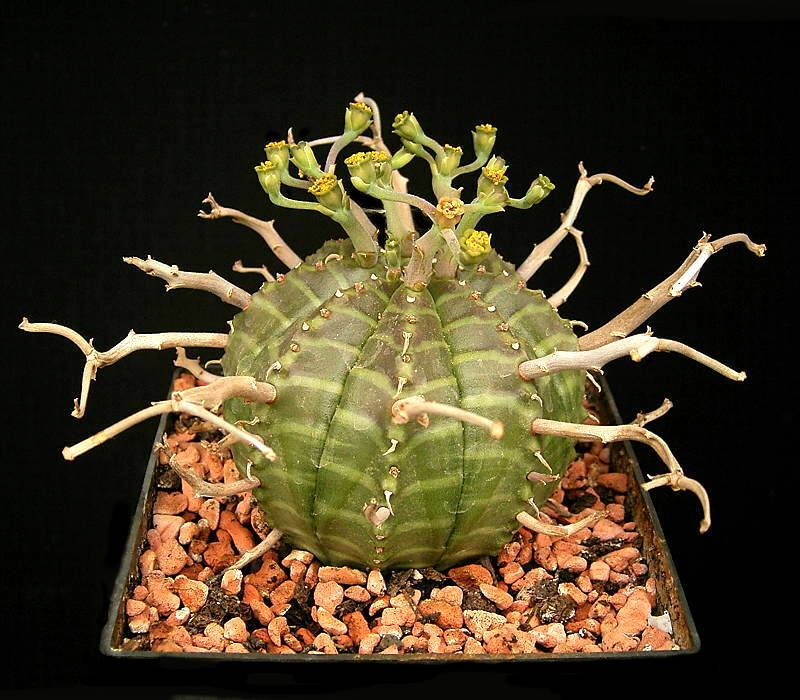
- In bloom
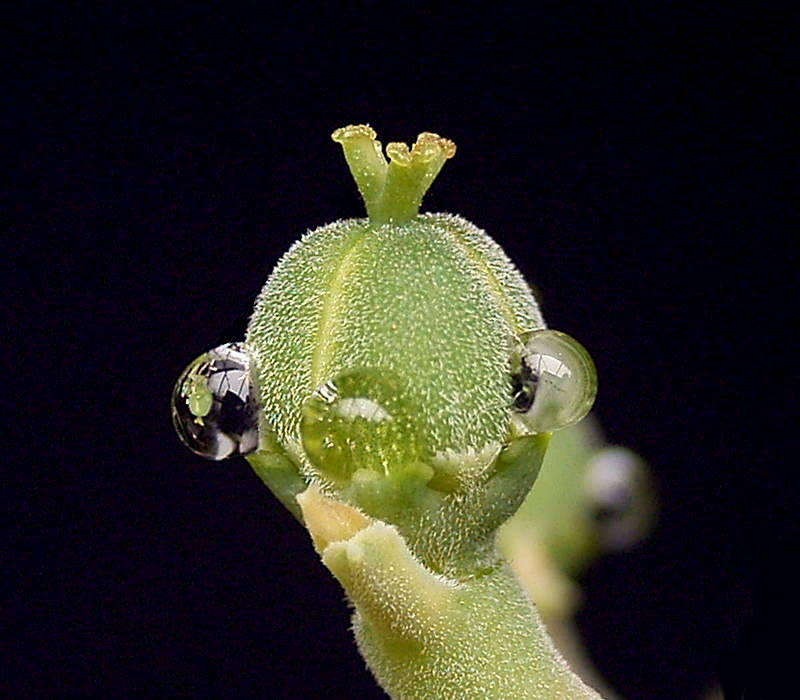
- Close-up showing nectar
- CITES Appendix II

Scientific classification
- Kingdom: Plantae
- Clade: Embryophytes
- Clade: Tracheophytes
- Clade: Spermatophytes
- Clade: Angiosperms
- Clade: Eudicots
- Clade: Rosids
- Order: Malpighiales
- Family: Euphorbiaceae
- Genus: Euphorbia
- Species: E. meloformis

Binomial name
- Euphorbia meloformis Aiton

Synonyms
- List: Euphorbia meloformis f. falsa (N.E.Br.) Marx; Euphorbia meloformis f. magna R.A.Dyer ex Marx; Euphorbia meloformis subsp. valida (N.E.Br.) G.D.Rowley; Euphorbia meloniformis Lem.; Euphorbia pomiformis Thunb.; Euphorbia pyriformis N.E.Br.; Euphorbia valida N.E.Br.

= Euphorbia meloformis =

Species of flowering plant

Euphorbia meloformis the melon spurge, is a species of flowering plant in the genus Euphorbia, native to the Cape Provinces of South Africa. A succulent, it has gained the Royal Horticultural Society's Award of Garden Merit.
