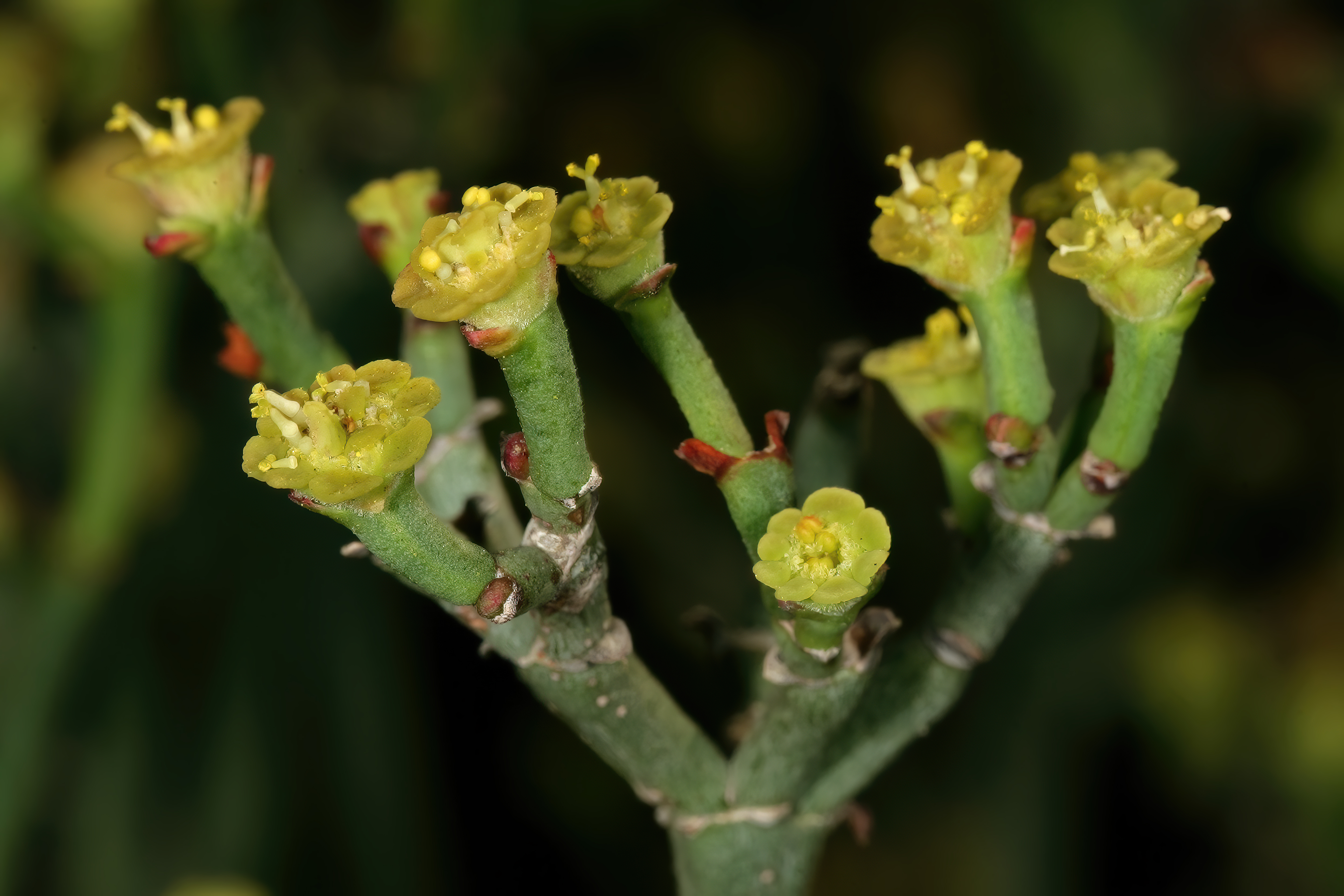

Scientific classification
- Kingdom: Plantae
- Clade: Tracheophytes
- Clade: Angiosperms
- Clade: Eudicots
- Clade: Rosids
- Order: Malpighiales
- Family: Euphorbiaceae
- Genus: Euphorbia
- Species: E. tenax

Binomial name
- Euphorbia tenax W.J.Burchell

= Euphorbia tenax =

Species of flowering plant

Euphorbia tenax is a species of Euphorbia endemic to South Africa, where it occurs in the Northern Cape and Western Cape provinces, around Kotzesrus and southwards as far as Nieuwoudtville and Cape Town. Its preferred habitat is sand Fynbos and Succulent Karoo on shale-derived slopes.

This species is one of several closely related "stick euphorbias", including Euphorbia burmanii, Euphorbia rhombifolia and Euphorbia stolonifera, which are widespread in southern Africa.
