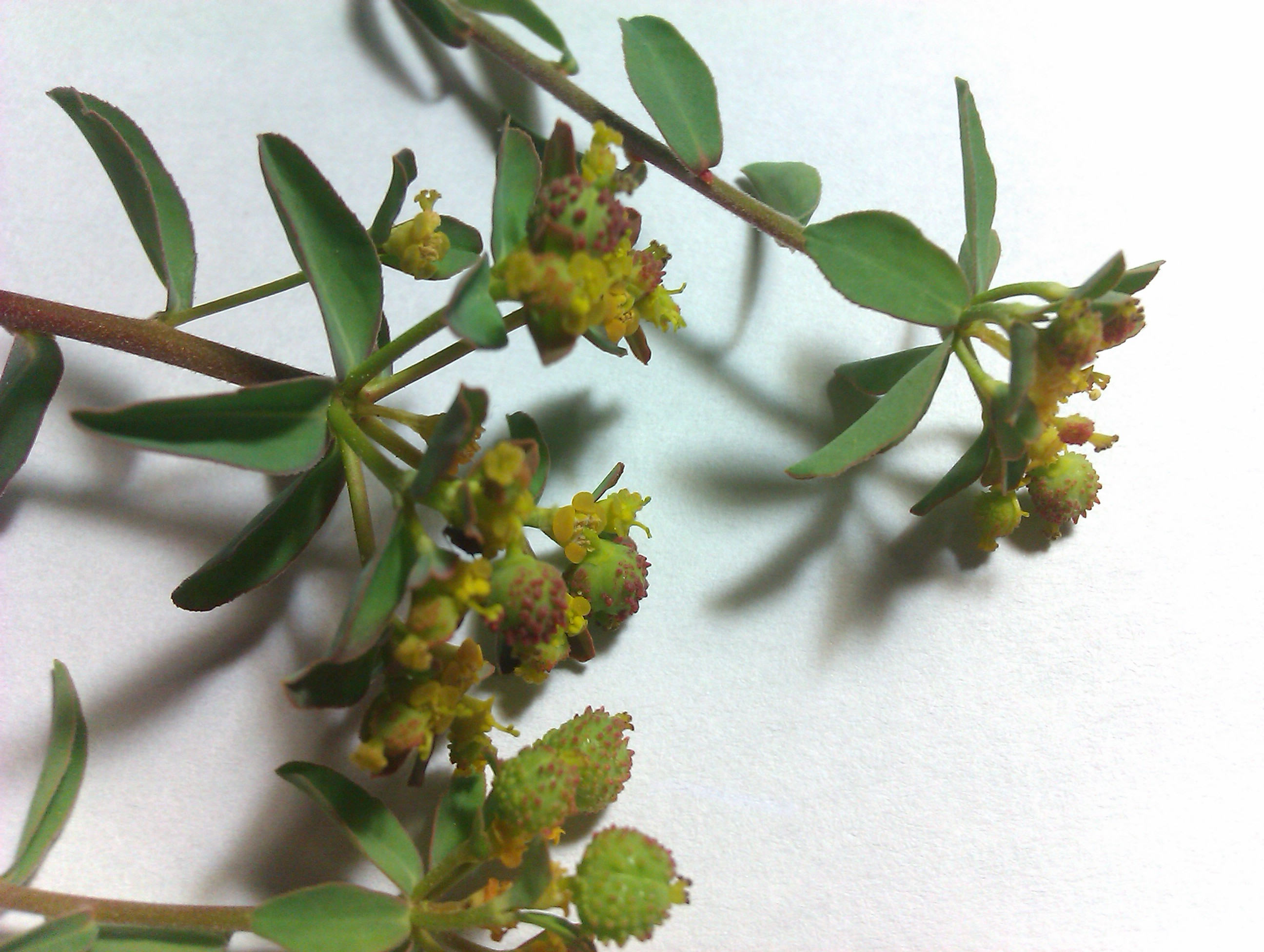

Scientific classification
- Kingdom: Plantae
- Clade: Tracheophytes
- Clade: Angiosperms
- Clade: Eudicots
- Clade: Rosids
- Order: Malpighiales
- Family: Euphorbiaceae
- Genus: Euphorbia
- Species: E. hirsuta

Binomial name
- Euphorbia hirsuta L.

Synonyms
- Euphorbia pubescens

= Euphorbia hirsuta =

Species of plant

Euphorbia hirsuta is a species of herb in the family Euphorbiaceae.

== Sources ==
This article incorporates text from a free content work. Licensed under CC0 (license statement/permission). Text taken from Euphorbia hirsuta. Encyclopedia of Life.
