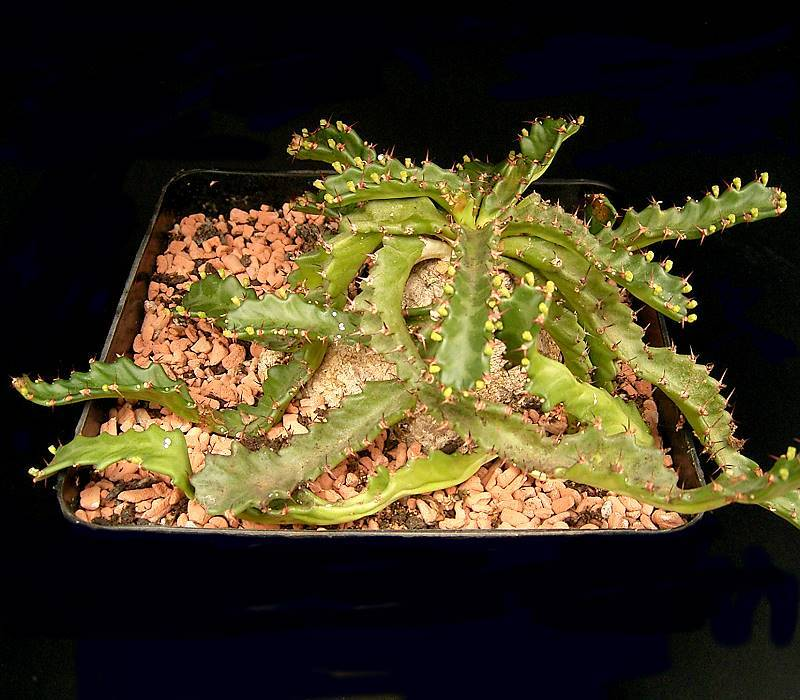
- In cultivation

Scientific classification
- Kingdom: Plantae
- Clade: Tracheophytes
- Clade: Angiosperms
- Clade: Eudicots
- Clade: Rosids
- Order: Malpighiales
- Family: Euphorbiaceae
- Genus: Euphorbia
- Species: E. stellata

Binomial name
- Euphorbia stellata Willd.

Synonyms
- Euphorbia radiata Thunb.; Euphorbia scolopendrea Haw.; Euphorbia uncinata DC.

= Euphorbia stellata =

Species of plant

Euphorbia stellata is a species of flowering plant in the spurge family (Euphorbiaceae) endemic to the Eastern Cape of South Africa.

The specific epithet stellata refers to the star-shaped arrangement of the stems around the caudex.
