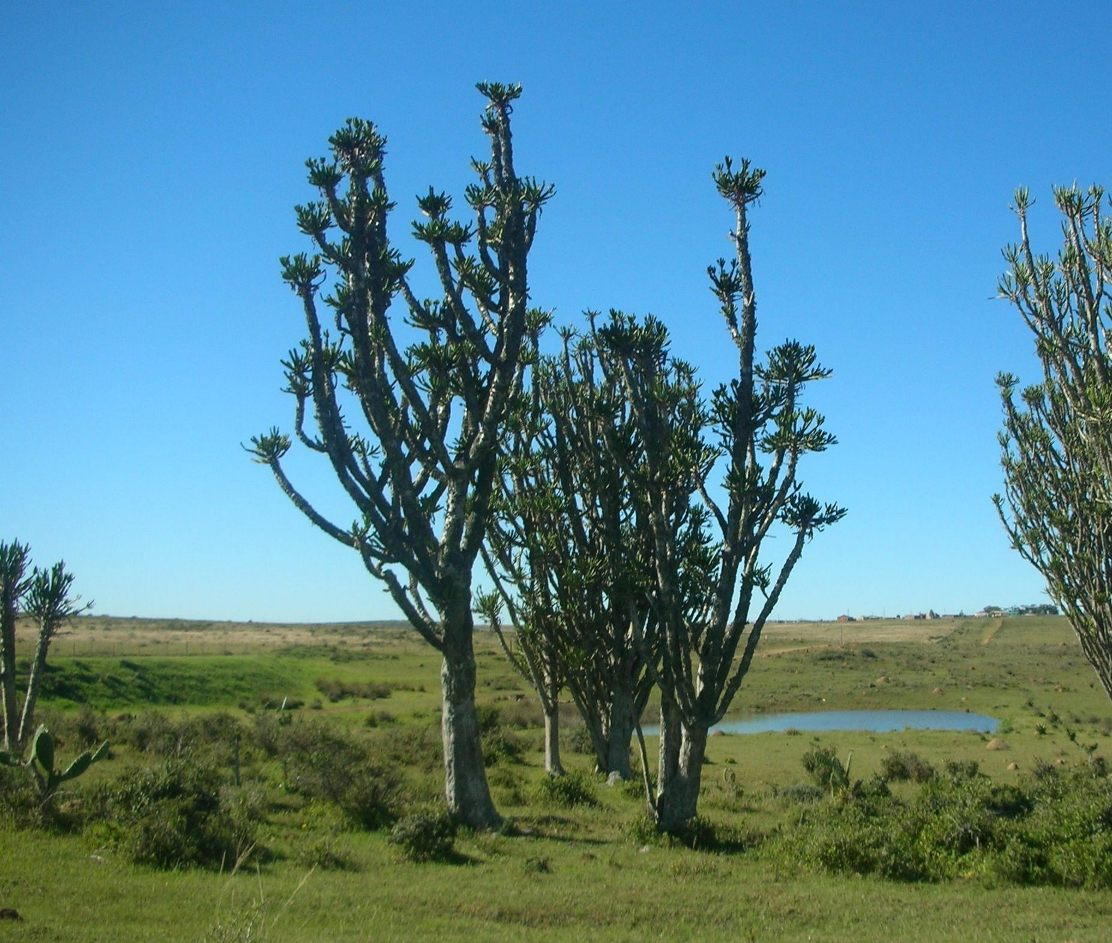

Scientific classification
- Kingdom: Plantae
- Clade: Tracheophytes
- Clade: Angiosperms
- Clade: Eudicots
- Clade: Rosids
- Order: Malpighiales
- Family: Euphorbiaceae
- Genus: Euphorbia
- Species: E. grandidens

Binomial name
- Euphorbia grandidens Haw.

= Euphorbia grandidens =

Species of succulent plant found in southern Africa

Euphorbia grandidens, commonly known as valleybush euphorbia or large-toothed euphorbia, is a species of plant in the family Euphorbiaceae native to southern Africa. While sometimes shrubby, it can also be a pachycaulous tree up to 15 metres (49 ft) tall, with the short horizontal branches in a rosette at the top of the main trunk and reiterations. These horizontal branches are succulent and triangular in cross-section.
