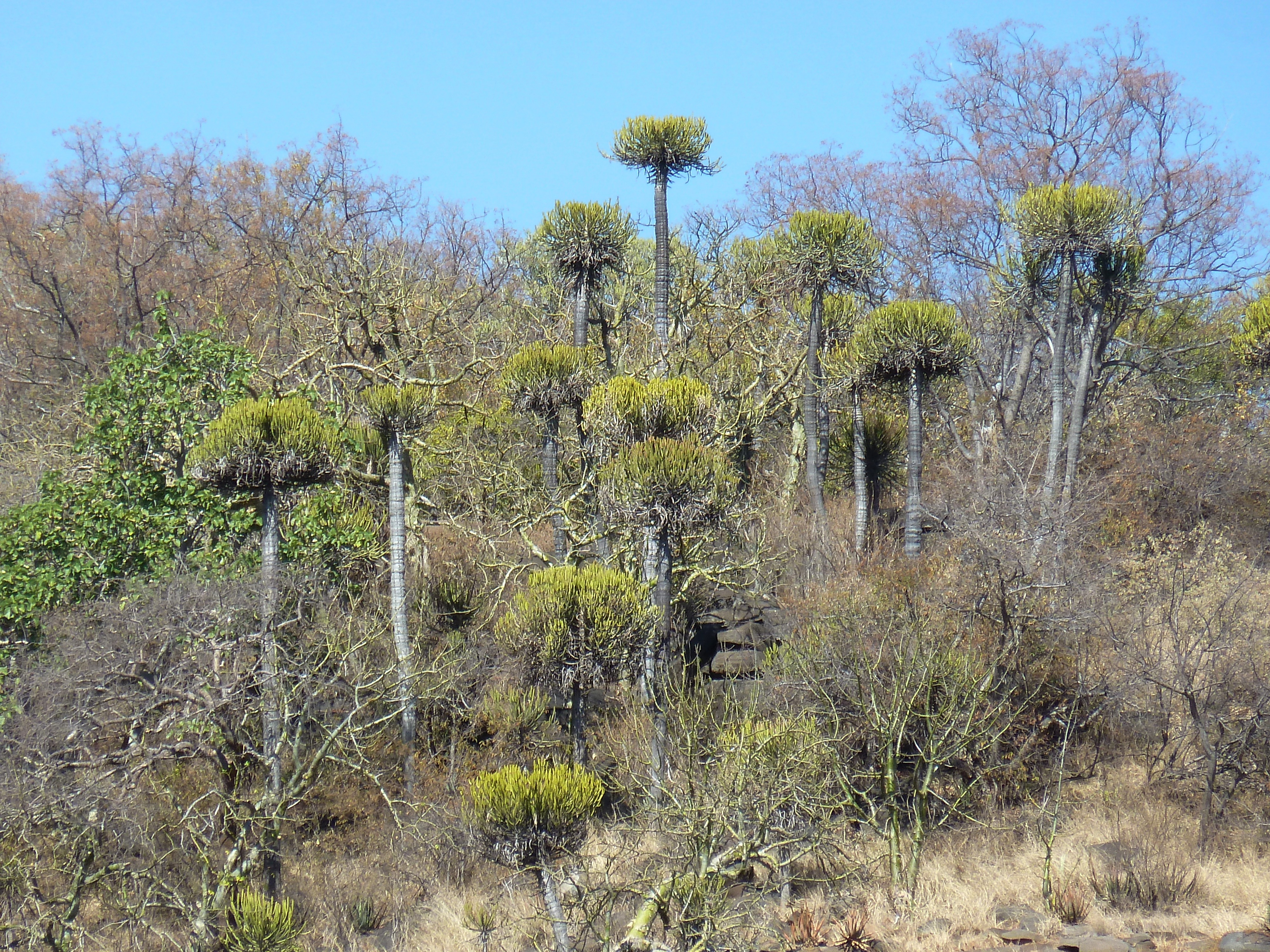
- In the Spekboom hills near Burgersfort

Conservation status
- Near Threatened (IUCN 2.3)

Scientific classification
- Kingdom: Plantae
- Clade: Tracheophytes
- Clade: Angiosperms
- Clade: Eudicots
- Clade: Rosids
- Order: Malpighiales
- Family: Euphorbiaceae
- Genus: Euphorbia
- Species: E. sekukuniensis

Binomial name
- Euphorbia sekukuniensis R.A.Dyer

= Euphorbia sekukuniensis =

Species of flowering plant

Euphorbia sekukuniensis is a species of plant in the family Euphorbiaceae. It a succulent shrub or tree endemic to south-central and southern Limpopo Province in South Africa.
