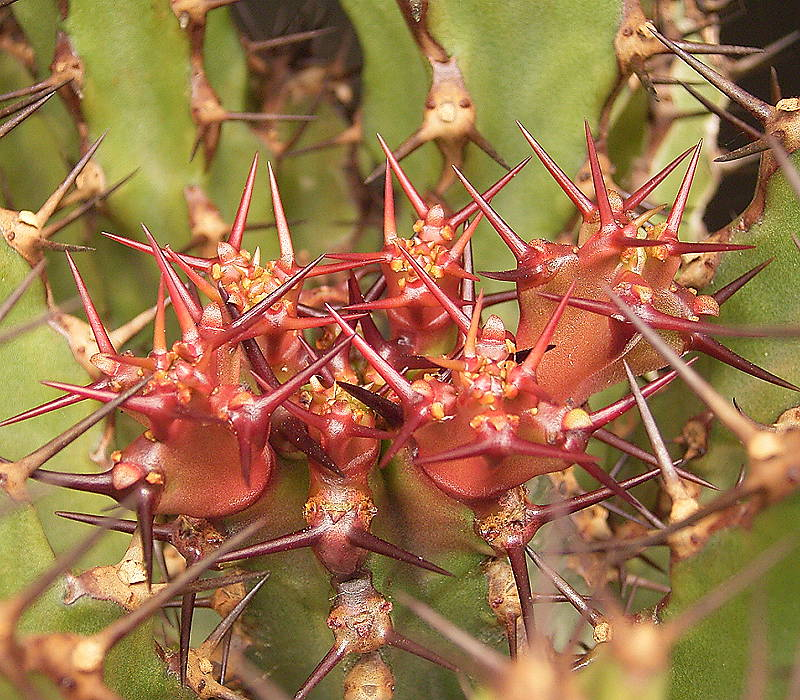

Conservation status
- Near Threatened (IUCN 2.3)

Scientific classification
- Kingdom: Plantae
- Clade: Tracheophytes
- Clade: Angiosperms
- Clade: Eudicots
- Clade: Rosids
- Order: Malpighiales
- Family: Euphorbiaceae
- Genus: Euphorbia
- Species: E. zoutpansbergensis

Binomial name
- Euphorbia zoutpansbergensis R.A.Dyer

= Euphorbia zoutpansbergensis =

Species of flowering plant

Euphorbia zoutpansbergensis is a species of plant in the family Euphorbiaceae. It is a succulent shrub or tree endemic to north-central Limpopo Province of South Africa.
