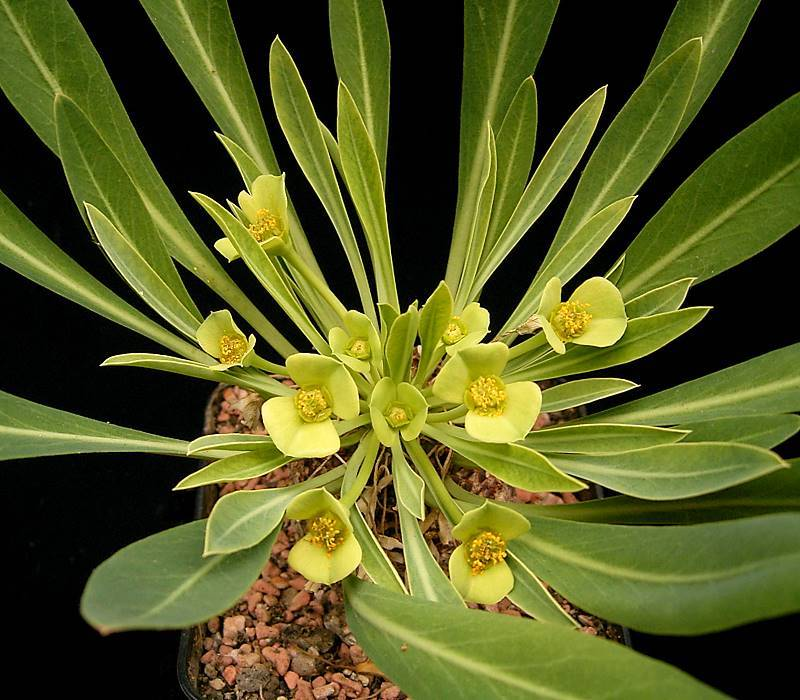

Scientific classification
- Kingdom: Plantae
- Clade: Tracheophytes
- Clade: Angiosperms
- Clade: Eudicots
- Clade: Rosids
- Order: Malpighiales
- Family: Euphorbiaceae
- Genus: Euphorbia
- Species: E. bupleurifolia

Binomial name
- Euphorbia bupleurifolia Jacq.

Synonyms
- Euphorbia proteifolia Boiss.; Tithymalus bupleurifolius (Jacq.) Haw.

= Euphorbia bupleurifolia =

Species of succulent plant found in southern Africa

Euphorbia bupleurifolia, commonly known as cycad spurge or pine cone plant, is a species of plant in the family Euphorbiaceae.

It is native to southern Africa. It is found in the South African regions of Cape Provinces and KwaZulu-Natal.

The Latin specific epithet of bupleurifolia refers to means ‘with leaves like those of the genus Bupleurum’, a large genus in the Apiaceae (carrot family), commonly called Hare's Ear. The genus name Bupleurum is also an ancient Greek word for ‘umbelliferous plant’. It was first described and published in Pl. Hort. Schoenbr. Vol.1 on page 55 in 1797.
