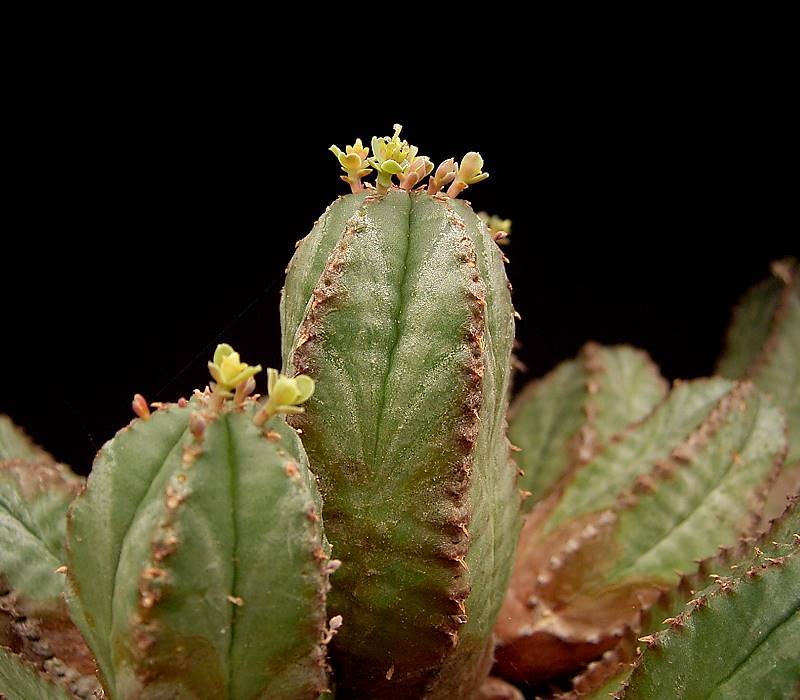

Scientific classification
- Kingdom: Plantae
- Clade: Tracheophytes
- Clade: Angiosperms
- Clade: Eudicots
- Clade: Rosids
- Order: Malpighiales
- Family: Euphorbiaceae
- Genus: Euphorbia
- Species: E. nesemannii

Binomial name
- Euphorbia nesemannii R.A.Dyer

= Euphorbia nesemannii =

Species of succulent plant found in southern Africa

Euphorbia nesemannii, commonly known as Nesemann's euphorbia, is a species of plant in the family Euphorbiaceae native to the Western Cape province in South Africa.

Banker and naturalist Alfred Nesemann discovered this species in 1930, near Robertson. Robert Allen Dyer named it after Nesemann.
