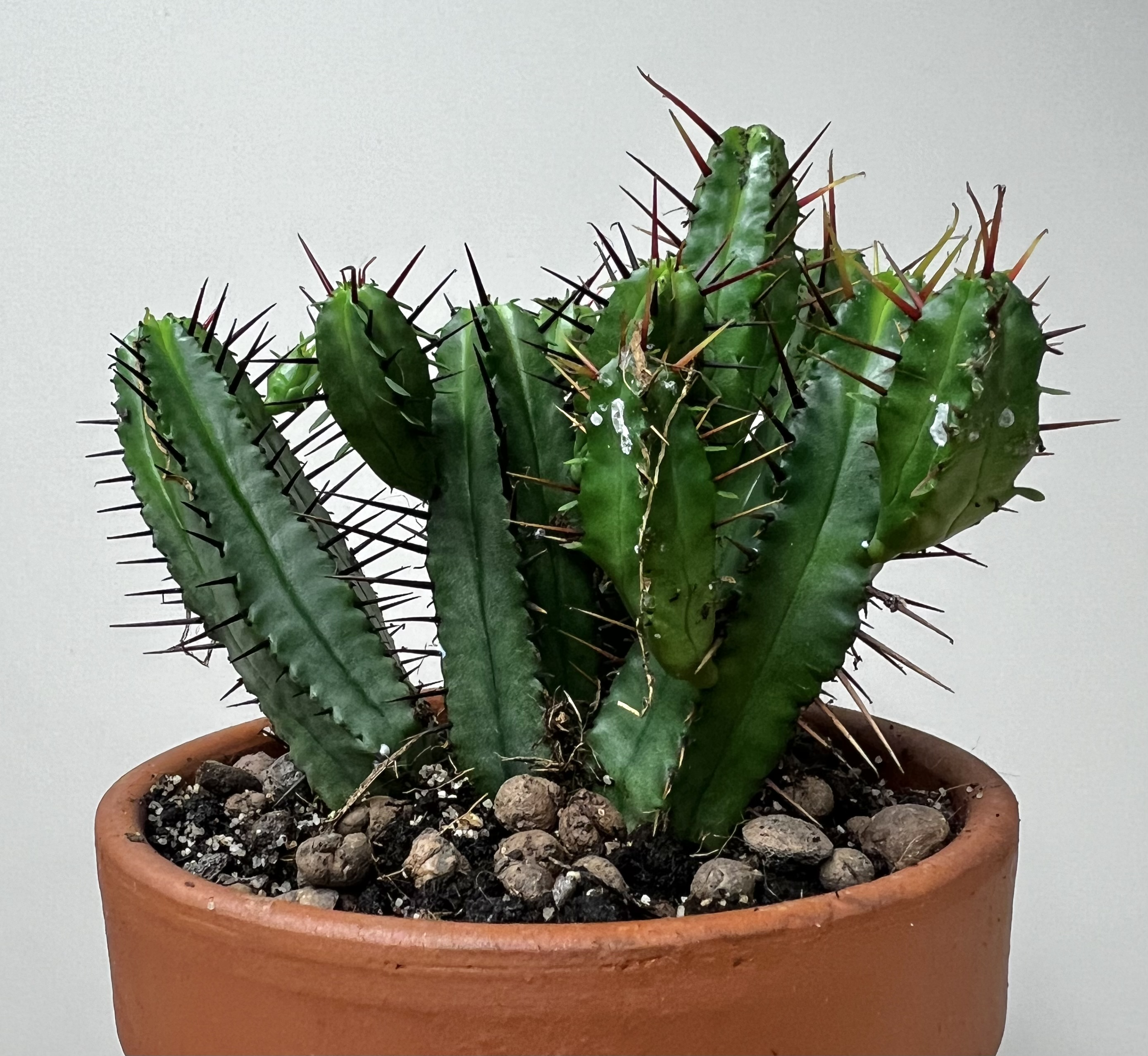

Scientific classification
- Kingdom: Plantae
- Clade: Embryophytes
- Clade: Tracheophytes
- Clade: Spermatophytes
- Clade: Angiosperms
- Clade: Eudicots
- Clade: Rosids
- Order: Malpighiales
- Family: Euphorbiaceae
- Genus: Euphorbia
- Species: E. heptagona

Binomial name
- Euphorbia heptagona L.

= Euphorbia heptagona =

Species of succulent flowering plant in the spurge family

Euphorbia heptagona, sometimes referred to as the milk barrel or pincushion euphorbia, is a subtropical succulent species of flowering plant in the genus Euphorbia native to South Africa. The species is also grown as a houseplant.

== Description ==
Euphorbia heptagona forms dense clusters of small succulent branches. Each branch typically has four ridges, each with a line of long spines. Young spines are often red or yellow, darkening to black as they mature. Like all Euphorbia species, Euphorbia heptagona exudes toxic white latex when damaged.

Euphorbia heptagona closely resembles many cacti, but this resemblance is due to convergent evolution. Euphorbias are not closely related to cacti.

Tests on the plant have identified the presence of flavonoids, alkaloids, tannins, glycosides, anthraquinones, triterpenoids, and phytosterols.

== Taxonomy ==
The species was named Euphorbia heptagona in 1753 by Carl Linnaeus. It is classified in the genus Euphorbia as part of the Euphorbiaceae family. It has twelve heterotypic synonyms several varieties, but no accepted varieties.

Table of Synonyms
Name	Year	Rank
Anthacantha desmetiana Lem.	1858	species
Euphorbia atrispina N.E.Br.	1915	species
Euphorbia atrispina var. viridis A.C.White, R.A.Dyer & B.Sloane	1941	variety
Euphorbia enopla Boiss.	1860	species
Euphorbia enopla var. dentata A.Berger	1906	variety
Euphorbia enopla var. viridis A.C.White, R.A.Dyer & B.Sloane	1941	variety
Euphorbia heptagona var. dentata (A.Berger) N.E.Br.	1915	variety
Euphorbia heptagona var. fulvispina A.Berger	1902	variety
Euphorbia heptagona var. ramosa A.C.White, R.A.Dyer & B.Sloane	1941	variety
Euphorbia heptagona var. subsessilis A.C.White, R.A.Dyer & B.Sloane	1941	variety
Euphorbia heptagona var. viridis A.C.White, R.A.Dyer & B.Sloane	1941	variety
Euphorbia morinii A.Berger	1907	species

== Names ==
Euphorbia heptagona is known by the common name milk barrel.

== Habitat ==
Native to South Africa, Euphorbia heptagona commonly grows in the Eastern Cape and Karoo regions.

It grows best in well-drained soil and with direct sunlight.
