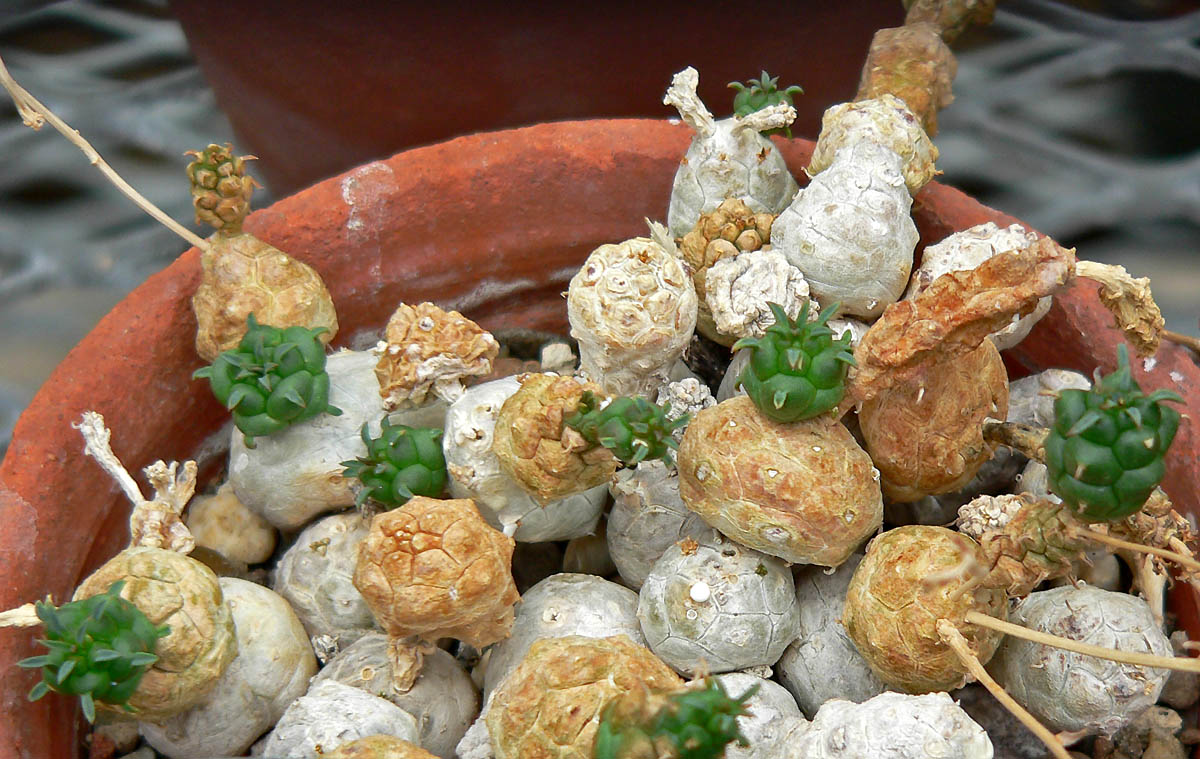

Scientific classification
- Kingdom: Plantae
- Clade: Tracheophytes
- Clade: Angiosperms
- Clade: Eudicots
- Clade: Rosids
- Order: Malpighiales
- Family: Euphorbiaceae
- Genus: Euphorbia
- Species: E. globosa

Binomial name
- Euphorbia globosa (Haw.) Sims

= Euphorbia globosa =

Species of succulent plant found in southern Africa

Euphorbia globosa, commonly known as globose euphorbia or globose spurge, is a species of plant in the family Euphorbiaceae native to southern Africa.
