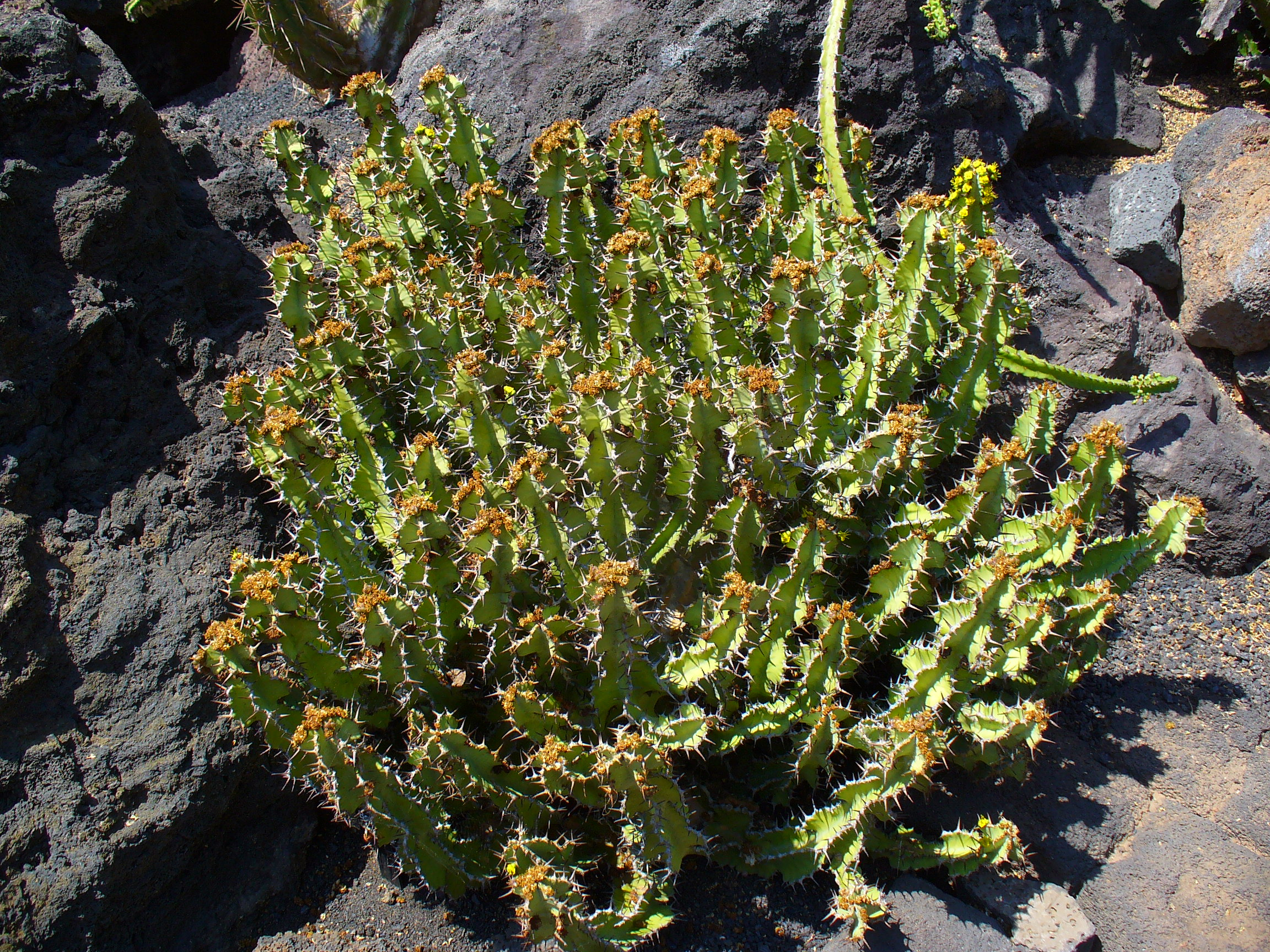

Scientific classification
- Kingdom: Plantae
- Clade: Tracheophytes
- Clade: Angiosperms
- Clade: Eudicots
- Clade: Rosids
- Order: Malpighiales
- Family: Euphorbiaceae
- Genus: Euphorbia
- Species: E. barnardii

Binomial name
- Euphorbia barnardii A.C.White, R.A.Dyer & B.Sloane

= Euphorbia barnardii =

Species of succulent plant found in southern Africa

Euphorbia barnardii, commonly known as mokgwakgwatha, is a species of plant in the family Euphorbiaceae native to southern Africa.
