= Euphorbia tetragona =

- Developing fruit
- Habit

Conservation status
- Least Concern (IUCN 3.1)

Scientific classification
- Kingdom: Plantae
- Clade: Tracheophytes
- Clade: Angiosperms
- Clade: Eudicots
- Clade: Rosids
- Order: Malpighiales
- Family: Euphorbiaceae
- Genus: Euphorbia
- Species: E. tetragona

Binomial name
- Euphorbia tetragona Haw.

Species of plant

Euphorbia tetragona, variously called the naboom, honey euphorbia, map tree, and square-stemmed euphorbia, is a species of flowering plant in the family Euphorbiaceae. It is native to the eastern Cape Provinces and southern KwaZulu-Natal. A succulent tree reaching 12 m (39 ft), it is relatively frost-hardy for a tree euphorbia. It has been assessed as Least Concern, with an unusual threat of attacks from Diceros bicornis, black rhinoceros.
