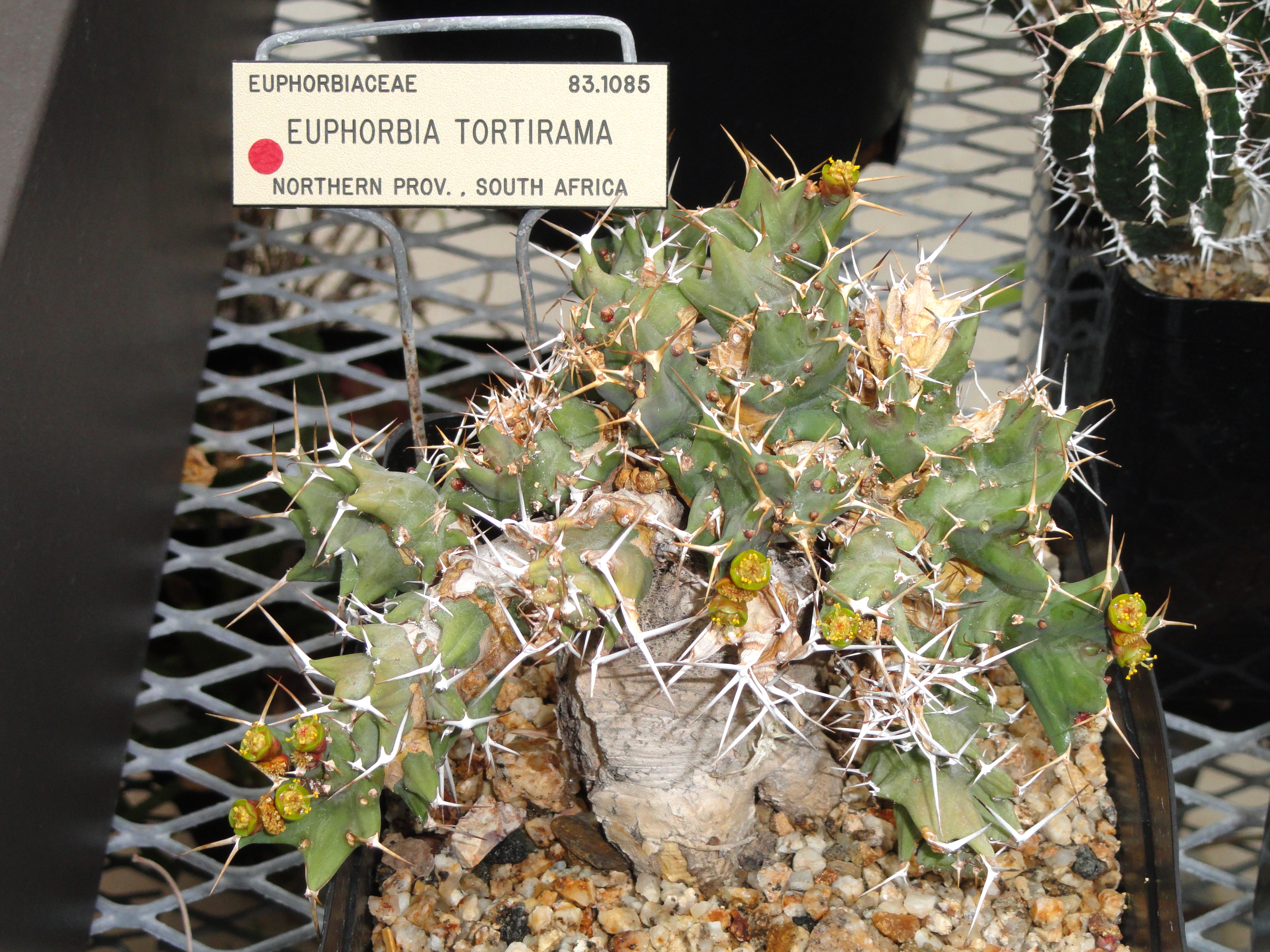
- Specimen with part of the root exposed, University of California Botanical Garden

Scientific classification
- Kingdom: Plantae
- Clade: Embryophytes
- Clade: Tracheophytes
- Clade: Spermatophytes
- Clade: Angiosperms
- Clade: Eudicots
- Clade: Rosids
- Order: Malpighiales
- Family: Euphorbiaceae
- Genus: Euphorbia
- Species: E. tortirama

Binomial name
- Euphorbia tortirama R.A.Dyer

Synonyms
- Euphorbia groenewaldii

= Euphorbia tortirama =

Plant species in the spurge family

Euphorbia tortirama is a succulent euphorbia that comes from northwestern South Africa.

== Description ==
The species has a tuberous taproot 30 cm long and as much as 15 cm thick topped by a caudex. From this sprout as many as 50 stems. The green photosynthetic stems with a length of 6 to 30 cm and a thickness of as much as 4.5 cm, though older branches will be brown at the base. The branches twist about their axis distinctively, but is somewhat similar to the four angled stems of Euphorbia clavigera. The branches have raised points with two leather-brown spines growing from them. The cyathia are found at the branch ends in groups of three. The latex of Euphorbia tortirama is quite toxic, like that of Euphorbia virosa, and can produce chemical skin burns.

== Taxonomy ==
In 1937 Robert Allen Dyer described a new species in the genus Euphorbia giving it the name Euphorbia tortirama. It is classified in the Euphorbiaceae family and has one heterotypic synonym, Euphorbia groenewaldii, also described by Dyer but in 1938.

== Range and conservation ==
Euphorbia tortirama is endemic to Limpopo, the northwestern province of South Africa. Though widespread, its populations are scattered and not large, with concerns being expressed about the large numbers being collected for sale by the 1980s.

== Cultivation ==
Plants grown from branch cuttings grow, but seldom develop the large fleshy root.
