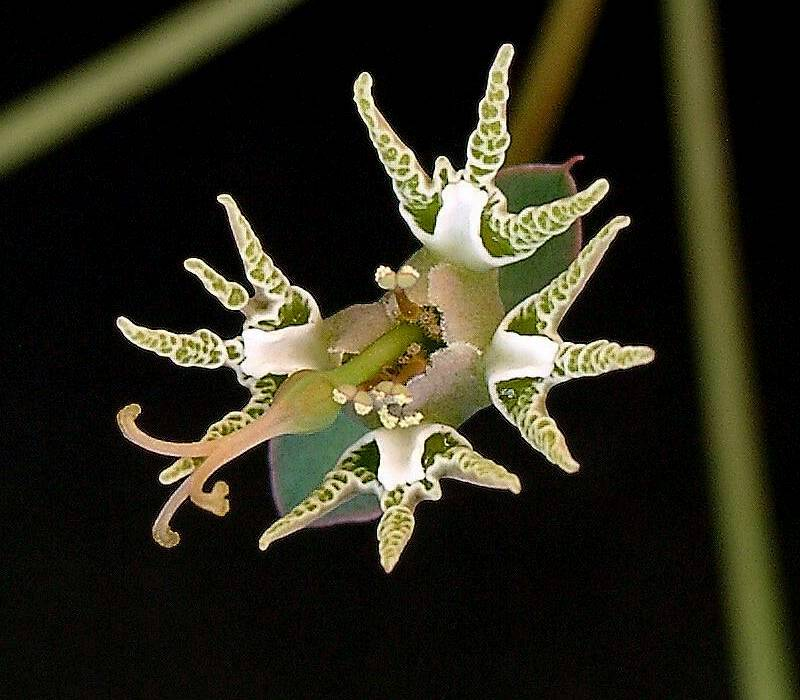

Scientific classification
- Kingdom: Plantae
- Clade: Tracheophytes
- Clade: Angiosperms
- Clade: Eudicots
- Clade: Rosids
- Order: Malpighiales
- Family: Euphorbiaceae
- Genus: Euphorbia
- Species: E. tridentata

Binomial name
- Euphorbia tridentata Lam.

= Euphorbia tridentata =

Species of flowering plant

Euphorbia tridentata is a species of succulent spurge native to the southern Cape, South Africa.

== Description ==
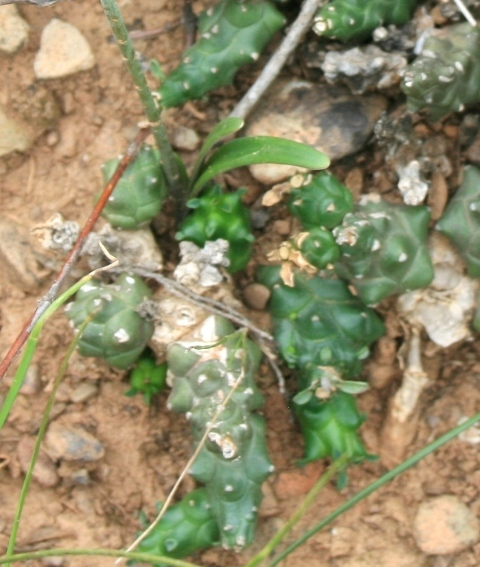
Euphorbia tridentata stems, Heidelberg, Western Cape.

A small, low, spreading, semi-geophytic stem-succulent, with tuberous roots and rhizomes. During the dry seasons, the stems can die back above ground. The stems are somewhat segmented. Each branch is rounded-to-cylindrical, but at its point of growth it is constricted.

The solitary cyathia are carried on short peduncles. Their five involucral glands each carry 3 or 4 distinctive finger-like outgrowths.

== Distribution and habitat ==
Euphorbia tridentata is endemic to South Africa.

In the Western Cape Province, it occurs around the town of Riversdale, westwards to Heidelberg and eastwards to Mossel Bay and Hartenbos.
