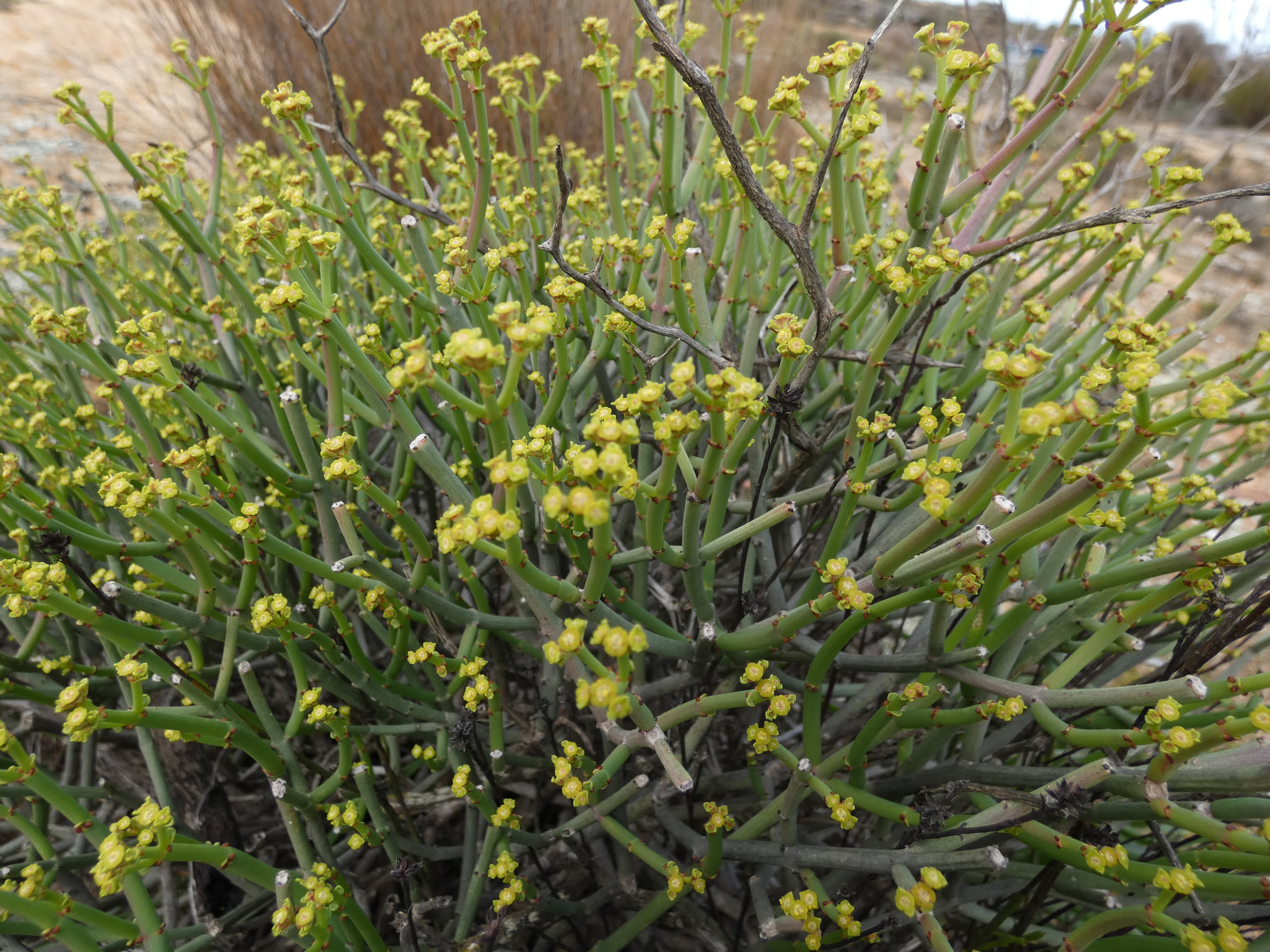

Scientific classification
- Kingdom: Plantae
- Clade: Embryophytes
- Clade: Tracheophytes
- Clade: Spermatophytes
- Clade: Angiosperms
- Clade: Eudicots
- Clade: Rosids
- Order: Malpighiales
- Family: Euphorbiaceae
- Genus: Euphorbia
- Species: E. rhombifolia

Binomial name
- Euphorbia rhombifolia Boiss.

Synonyms
- List: *Arthrothamnus brachiatus E.Mey. ex Klotzsch & Garcke; *Arthrothamnus densiflorus Klotzsch & Garcke; *Euphorbia amarifontana N.E.Br.; *Euphorbia bayeri L.C.Leach; *Euphorbia caterviflora N.E.Br.; *Euphorbia chersina N.E.Br.; *Euphorbia hastisquama N.E.Br.; *Euphorbia mundii N.E.Br.; *Euphorbia perpera N.E.Br.; *Euphorbia rudolfii N.E.Br.; *Tirucalia amarifontana (N.E.Br.) P.V.Heath; *Tirucalia brachiata (E.Mey. ex Klotzsch & Garcke) P.V.Heath; *Tirucalia caterviflora (N.E.Br.) P.V.Heath; *Tirucalia chersina (N.E.Br.) P.V.Heath; *Tirucalia densiflora (Klotzsch & Garcke) P.V.Heath; *Tirucalia perpera (N.E.Br.) P.V.Heath; *Tirucalia rhombifolia (Boiss.) P.V.Heath; *Tirucalia rudolfii (N.E.Br.) P.V.Heath

= Euphorbia rhombifolia =

Species of flowering plant

Euphorbia rhombifolia is a species of flowering plant in the Euphorbiaceae family. It is native to Namibia and South Africa, where it is widespread in clay-rich soils, extending as far east as Kwazulu-Natal.

As most other succulent members of the genus Euphorbia, its trade is regulated under Appendix II of CITES.

== Description ==
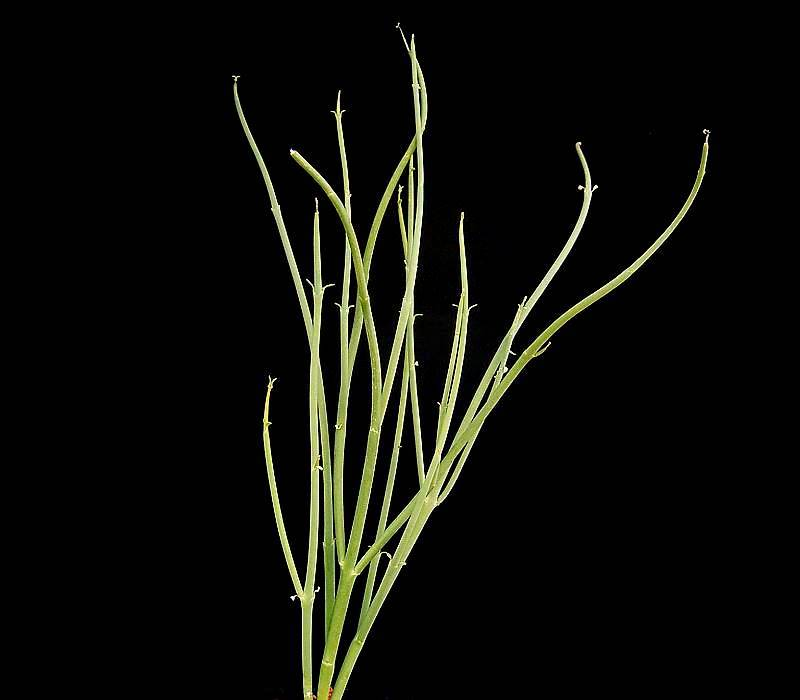
Euphorbia rhombifolia in cultivation

It grows to 60 or 70 cm (24 or 28 in) in height, with a tuberous root-system that is often eaten by porcupines, and with thin (3–5 mm), erect, grey, branching stems. The branches are dichotomous and taper to soft points.

The plants in the south-western Cape (E. caterviflora) are smaller, reaching only 30 cm (12 in) in height.

The leaves are small (1–3 mm), dark, triangular and deciduous. The flowerheads are also small (3 mm) and appear from winter into spring.

=== Related species ===
This species is part of a group of closely related "stick euphorbias" including Euphorbia burmanni and Euphorbia tenax, which are widespread across southern Africa.
