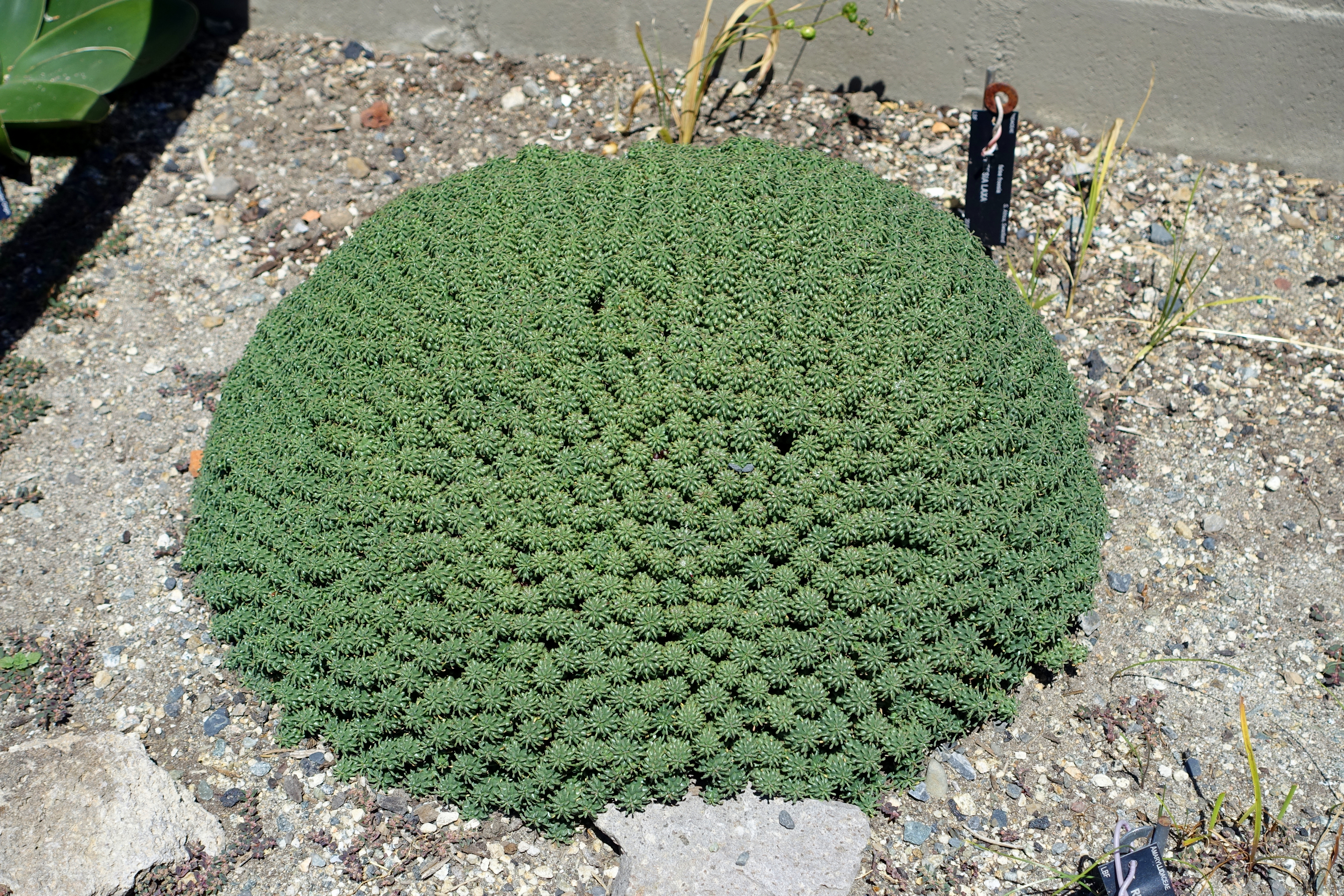

Scientific classification
- Kingdom: Plantae
- Clade: Embryophytes
- Clade: Tracheophytes
- Clade: Spermatophytes
- Clade: Angiosperms
- Clade: Eudicots
- Clade: Rosids
- Order: Malpighiales
- Family: Euphorbiaceae
- Genus: Euphorbia
- Species: E. clavarioides

Binomial name
- Euphorbia clavarioides Boiss.

Synonyms
- Euphorbia basutica Marloth; Euphorbia clavarioides var. clavarioides Euphorbia clavarioides var. truncata A.C.White, R.A.Dyer & B.Sloane; Euphorbia truncata N.E.Br.

= Euphorbia clavarioides =

Species of flowering plant

Euphorbia clavarioides, lion's spoor, anthill euphorbia, is a species of herbaceous plant in the family Euphorbiaceae. It is native to Botswana, Lesotho, and South Africa. It may grow to 18 cm (7.1 in) in diameter, with a height of 30 cm (12 in). Its flowers are yellow.

== Sources ==
- Cent. Euphorb. 25 1860.
- The Plant List
- Birhmann's Caudiciforms
