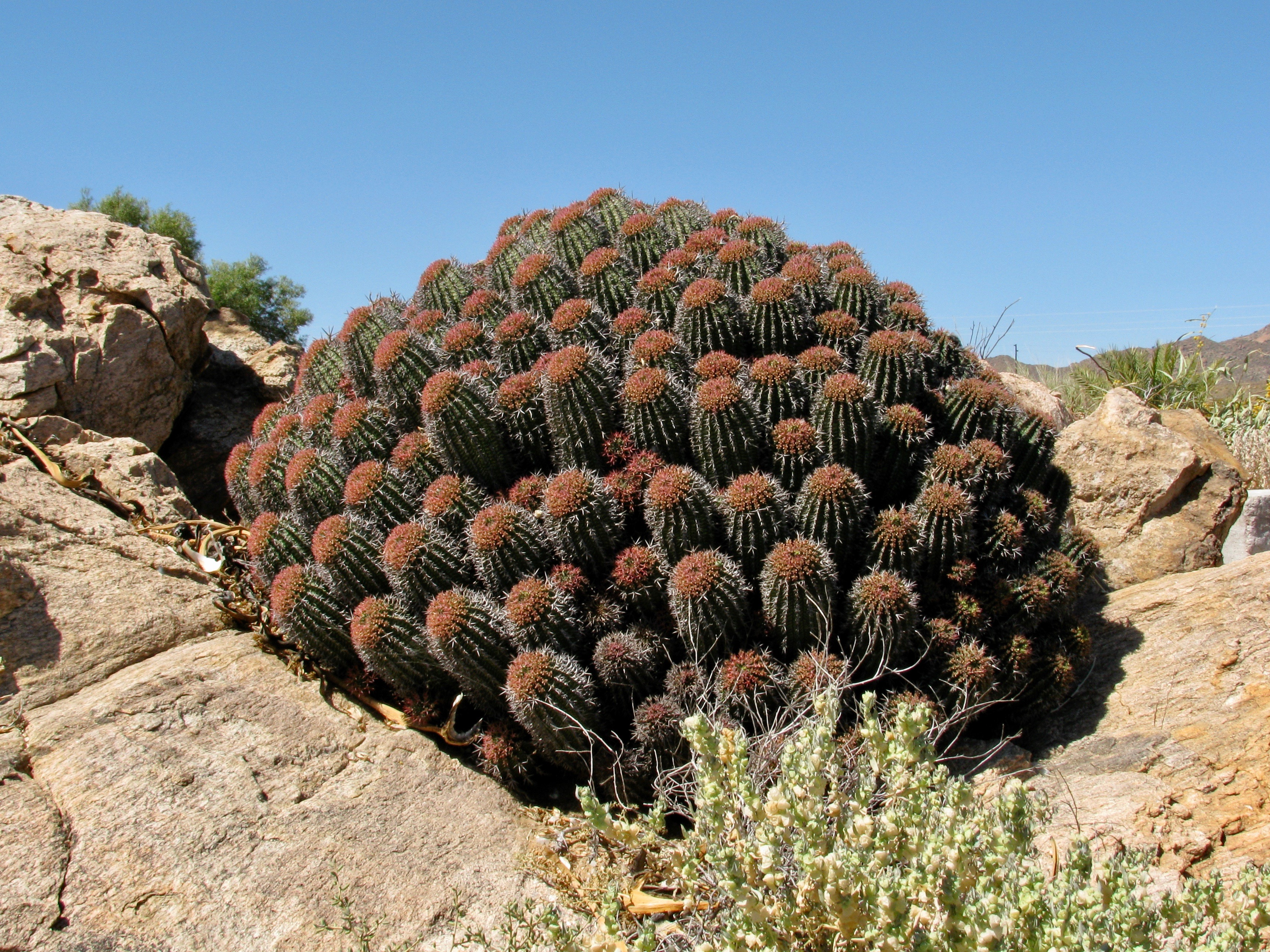

Scientific classification
- Kingdom: Plantae
- Clade: Tracheophytes
- Clade: Angiosperms
- Clade: Eudicots
- Clade: Rosids
- Order: Malpighiales
- Family: Euphorbiaceae
- Genus: Euphorbia
- Species: E. stellispina

Binomial name
- Euphorbia stellispina Haw.

Synonyms
- Euphorbia astrispin N.E.Br.

= Euphorbia stellispina =

Species of succulent plant found in southern Africa

Euphorbia stellispina is a species of flowering plant in the family Euphorbiaceae endemic to southern Africa. It is locally known in Afrikaans as skaapnoors, sterretjie-noors, or Karoo noorsdoring. Euphorbia stellispina grows in rocky areas of karroid shrublands.
