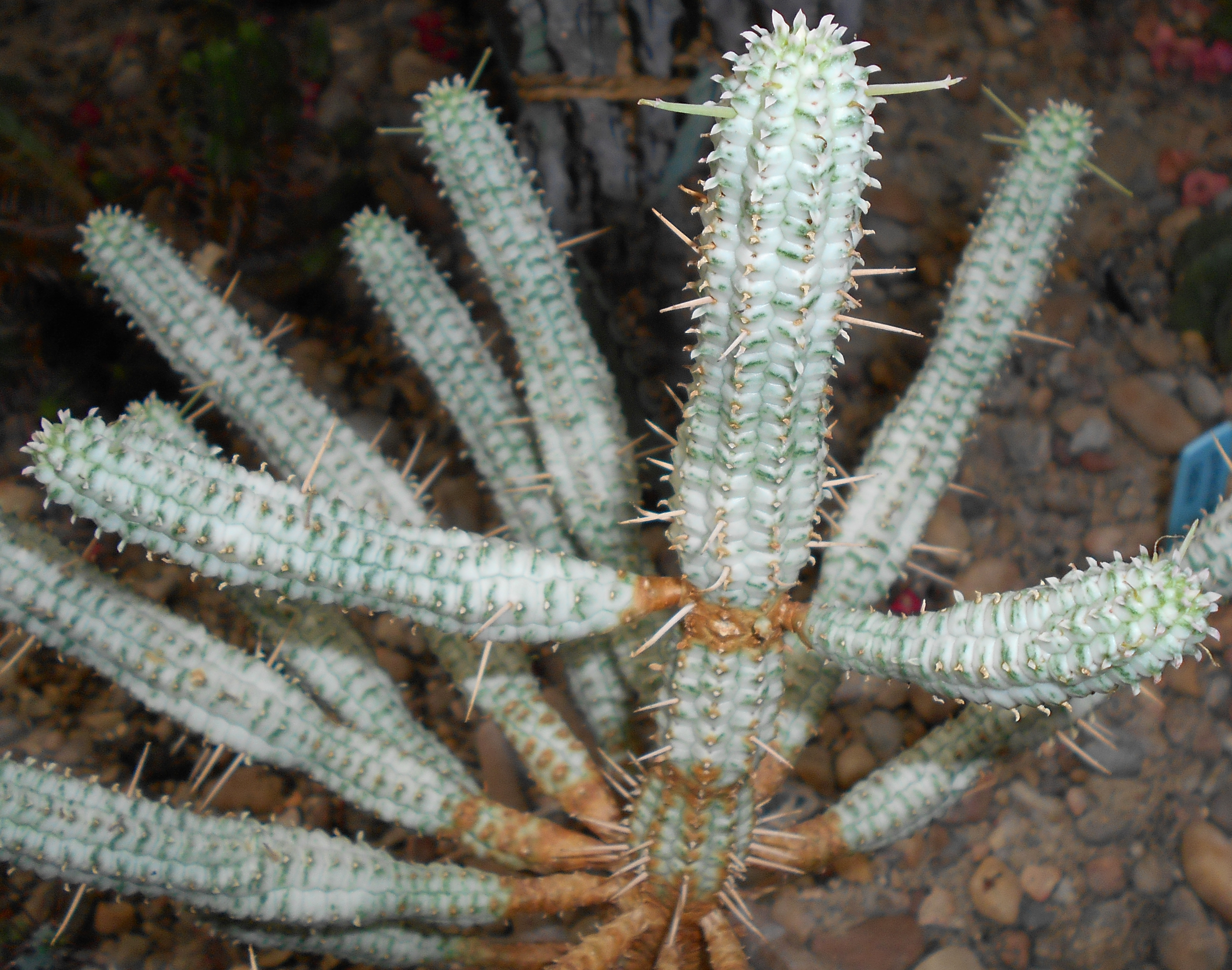
- CITES Appendix II

Scientific classification
- Kingdom: Plantae
- Clade: Tracheophytes
- Clade: Angiosperms
- Clade: Eudicots
- Clade: Rosids
- Order: Malpighiales
- Family: Euphorbiaceae
- Genus: Euphorbia
- Species: E. mammillaris

Binomial name
- Euphorbia mammillaris L.

= Euphorbia mammillaris =

Species of flowering plant

Euphorbia mammillaris (often mis-spelled Euphorbia mamillaris) is a plant species endemic to Cape Province of South Africa. Euphorbia mammillaris, also known as African or Indian corn-cob, is a fast-growing shrublet, with thick stems that are chalky green, erect and ribbed.

The variegated form, E. mammillaris variegata, is normally a beige-white colour when protected under shade cover, trees, other plants, or rocks; its white stems will become tinged with magenta, fuchsia, and tones of rosy-pink in areas of more sun exposure, times of drought, or in colder weather. Nearing maturity, the plant can reach a foot to two feet tall. Each stem can have from seven to seventeen ribs of thick, hexagonal tubercles growing next to each other vertically, which resembles the look of a corn-cob. The pseudo-spines are pinkish white, thick and pointy, almost like blunt toothpicks, only up to 0.4 inches (1 cm) long and scattered around the top of the plants. From late winter to early summer, this succulent produces small red and orange flowers from each stem.

The scientific name E. mammillaris gives credence to the plant’s superficial resemblance to American cactus; in this case, the Mammillaria cacti. Ironically, most Mammillaria cacti are globular, low-growing plants, while Euphorbia mammillaris is rather vertical and columnar in shape and growth habit. However, this is outward appearance-specific, as this succulent is not a true cactus. Additionally, Euphorbia plants are all fairly toxic, and poisonous if ingested. They contain caustic latex sap, which drips profusely when the plant is damaged. Care must be taken and gloves worn when handling; if this liquid gets into an open wound on the skin, or into the eyes, mouth, ears, nose (or any mucous membrane), burning pain and allergic reaction is likely to occur. In certain extreme instances (especially if oral contact is made), swelling of the throat can develop, with anaphylactic shock and suffocation leading to possible death.
