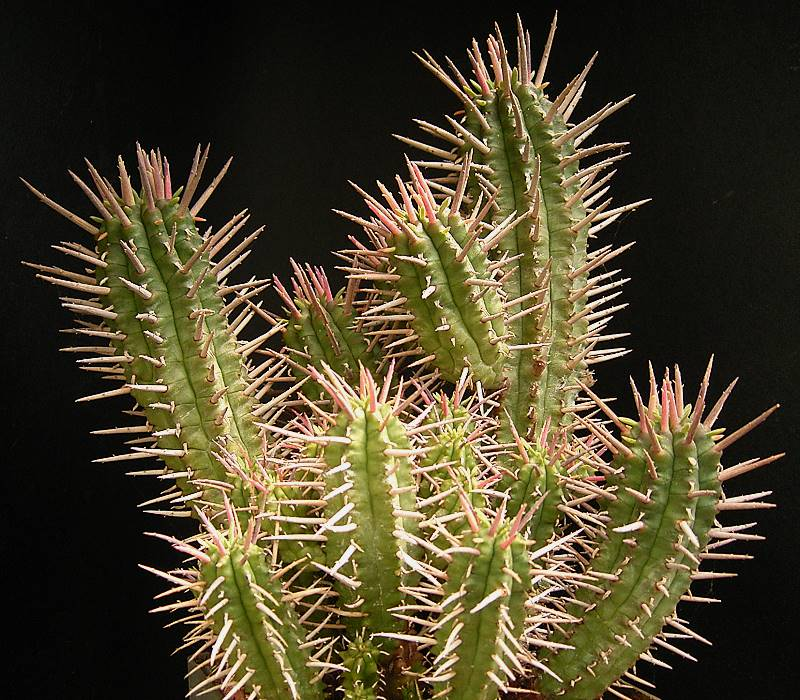
- CITES Appendix II

Scientific classification
- Kingdom: Plantae
- Clade: Tracheophytes
- Clade: Angiosperms
- Clade: Eudicots
- Clade: Rosids
- Order: Malpighiales
- Family: Euphorbiaceae
- Genus: Euphorbia
- Species: E. ferox

Binomial name
- Euphorbia ferox Marloth

= Euphorbia ferox =

Species of flowering plant

Euphorbia ferox is a species of flowering plant in the family Euphorbiaceae.
