= List of Euphorbia species (P–Z) =

Euphorbia is a highly diverse plant genus, comprising some 5,000 currently accepted taxa.

This is an alphabetical list of the Euphorbia species and notable intraspecific taxa.

The list includes the former (and never generally accepted) genus Chamaesyce, as well as the related genera Elaeophorbia, Endadenium, Monadenium, Synadenium and Pedilanthus which according to recent DNA sequence-based phylogenetic studies are all nested within Euphorbia

Noticeably succulent plants are marked by (s).

== P ==
- Euphorbia pachyclada S.Carter (s)
- Euphorbia pachypoda Urb.
- Euphorbia pachypodioides Boiteau (s)
- Euphorbia pachyrrhiza Kar. & Kir.
- Euphorbia pachysantha Baill. (s)
- Euphorbia paganorum A.Chev. (s)
- Euphorbia palmeri Engelm. ex S.Watson - Wood spurge, woodland spurge
- Euphorbia paludicola McVaugh
- Euphorbia palustris L. - Marsh spurge
- Euphorbia pamirica (Prokh.) Prokh.
- Euphorbia pampeana Speg. (s)
- Euphorbia pancheri Baillon (s)
- Euphorbia panchganiensis Blatt. & McCann ex Blatt. (s)
- Euphorbia pancicii G.Beck
- Euphorbia paniculata Desf.
- Euphorbia panjutinii Grossh.
- Euphorbia pantomalaca Standl. & Steyerm. (s)
- Euphorbia papilionum S.Carter (s)
- Euphorbia papillaris (Jan ex Boiss.) Raffaelli & Ricceri (s)
- Euphorbia papillosa A.St.-Hil. (s)
  - Euphorbia papillosa var. erythrorrhiza (Boiss.) Subils (s)
  - Euphorbia papillosa var. papillosa (s)
- Euphorbia papillosicapsa L.C.Leach (s)
- Euphorbia paradoxa (Schur) Simonk.
- Euphorbia paraikalli B.De Jong, Malpure & Mahalingam
- Euphorbia paralias L. - Sea spurge
- Euphorbia paranensis Dusén
- Euphorbia parciflora Urb.
- Euphorbia parciramulosa Schweinf. (s)
- Euphorbia paredonensis (Millsp.) Oudejans
- Euphorbia parifolia N.E.Br.
- Euphorbia parishii Greene
- Euphorbia parodii Oudejans
- Euphorbia parryi Engelm.
- Euphorbia parva N.E.Br.
- Euphorbia parvicaruncula D.C.Hassall (s)
- Euphorbia parviceps L.C.Leach (s)
- Euphorbia parvicyathophora Rauh (s)
- Euphorbia parviflora L.
- Euphorbia parvula Delile
- Euphorbia patula P.Miller
- Euphorbia patentispina S.Carter (s)
- Euphorbia paucipila Urb.
- Euphorbia pauciradiata Blatt.
- Euphorbia paulianii Ursch & Leandri (s)
- Euphorbia paxiana Dinter
- Euphorbia pedemontana L.C.Leach (s)
- Euphorbia pedersenii Subils
- Euphorbia pediculifera Engelm.
- Euphorbia pedilanthoides Denis (s)
- Euphorbia pedroi Molero & Rovira (s)
- Euphorbia peganoides Boiss.
- Euphorbia peisonis Rech.
- Euphorbia pekinensis Rupr.
  - Euphorbia pekinensis subsp. asoensis Kurosawa & H.Ohashi
  - Euphorbia pekinensis subsp. fauriei Kurosawa & H.Ohashi
  - Euphorbia pekinensis subsp. lasiocaula Boiss. & Oudejans
  - Euphorbia pekinensis subsp. pekinensis
  - Euphorbia pekinensis subsp. pseudolucorum Hurus. & Oudejans
  - Euphorbia pekinensis subsp. sinanensis Hurus. & Oudejans
  - Euphorbia pekinensis subsp. subulatifolius Hurus. & T.B.Lee
  - Euphorbia pekinensis subsp. watanabei Makino & Oudejans
- Euphorbia pellegrinii Leandri
- Euphorbia peltata Roxb.
- Euphorbia peninsularis I.M.Johnst.
- Euphorbia pentadactyla Griseb
- Euphorbia pentagona Haw. (s)
- Euphorbia pentlandii Boiss.
- Euphorbia pentops A.C.White, R.A.Dyer & B.Sloane (s)
- Euphorbia peperomioides Boiss.
- Euphorbia peplidion Engelm. - Low spurge
- Euphorbia peplis L. - Purple spurge
- Euphorbia peplus L. - Petty spurge
- Euphorbia perangusta R.A.Dyer (s)
- Euphorbia perangustifolia S.Carter
- Euphorbia perarmata S.Carter1992 (s)
- Euphorbia perbracteata Gage
- Euphorbia perennans (Shinners) Warnock & I.M.Johnst.
- Euphorbia pereskiifolia Baill. (s) (= Synadenium pereskiifolium)
- Euphorbia perfoliata Scheutz
- Euphorbia pergracilis P.G.Mey.
- Euphorbia peritropoides (Millsp.) V.W.Steinm. (= Pedilanthus peritropoides)
- Euphorbia perlignea McVaugh
- Euphorbia perpera N.E.Br. (s)
- Euphorbia perplexa L.C.Leach (s)
  - Euphorbia perplexa var. kasamana L.C.Leach (s)
  - Euphorbia perplexa var. perplexa (s)
- Euphorbia perrieri Drake (s)
  - Euphorbia perrieri var. elongata Denis (s)
  - Euphorbia perrieri var. perrieri (s)
- Euphorbia persistentifolia L.C.Leach (s)
- Euphorbia personata Croizat & V.W.Steinm. (s) (= Pedilanthus personatus)
- Euphorbia peruviana L.C.Wheeler
- Euphorbia pervilleana Baillon (s)
- Euphorbia pestalozzae Boiss.
- Euphorbia petala Ewart & L.R.Kerr
- Euphorbia pervittata S.Carter (s)
- Euphorbia petiolaris Sims (s) - Manchineel berry
- Euphorbia petiolata Banks & Sol.
- Euphorbia petitiana A.Rich.
- Euphorbia petraea S.Carter (s)
- Euphorbia petricola P.R.O.Bally & S.Carter (s)
- Euphorbia petrina S.Watson
- Euphorbia petrophila C.A.Mey.
- Euphorbia pettersonii Svent.
- Euphorbia pfeilii Pax
- Euphorbia philippiana (Klotzsch & Garcke ex Klotzsch) Boiss.
- Euphorbia phillipsiae N.E.Br. (s)
- Euphorbia phillipsioides S.Carter (s)
- Euphorbia phosphorea Mart. (s)
- Euphorbia phylloclada Boiss. (s)
- Euphorbia phymatosperma Boiss. & Gaill. ex Boiss.
  - Euphorbia phymatosperma subsp. cernua (Coss. & Durieu) Vindt
  - Euphorbia phymatosperma subsp. phymatosperma
- Euphorbia physalifolia Boiss.
- Euphorbia phosocaulos Mouterde
- Euphorbia physoclada Boiss. (s)
- Euphorbia picachensis Brandegee
- Euphorbia pillansii N.E.Br. (s)
  - Euphorbia pillansii var. albovirens A.C.White, R.A.Dyer & B.Sloane (s)
  - Euphorbia pillansii var. pillansii (s)
  - Euphorbia pillansii var. ramosissima A.C.White, R.A.Dyer & B.Sloane (s)
- Euphorbia pilosa L.
  - Euphorbia pilosa subsp. ojensis Stepanov
  - Euphorbia pilosa subsp. pilosa
- Euphorbia pilosissima S.Carter
- Euphorbia pinariona Urb.
- Euphorbia pinetorum (Small) G.L.Webster - Pineland spurge
- Euphorbia pinkavana I.M.Johnst.
- Euphorbia pionosperma V.W.Steinm. & Felger
- Euphorbia pirottae A.Terracc. (s)
- Euphorbia piscatoria Aiton (s)
- Euphorbia piscidermis M.G.Gilbert (s)
- Euphorbia piscida Hub.-Mor. & M.S.Khan ex M.S.Khan
- Euphorbia pitcairnensis N.E.Br.
- Euphorbia pithyusa L.
  - Euphorbia pithyusa subsp. cupanii (Guss. ex Bertol.) Radcl.-Sm.
  - Euphorbia pithyusa subsp. dianthifolia (Lojac.) Oudejans
  - Euphorbia pithyusa subsp. pithyusa
- Euphorbia plagiantha Drake (s) - Fish skin euphorb
- Euphorbia planiceps A.C.White, R.A.Dyer & B.Sloane (s)
- Euphorbia planiticola D.C.Hassall (s)
- Euphorbia platycephala Pax (s)
- Euphorbia platyclada Rauh (s)
  - Euphorbia platyclada var. hardyi Rauh (s)
  - Euphorbia platyclada var. platyclada (s)
- Euphorbia platyphyllos L. - Broad-leaved spurge
- Euphorbia platypoda Pax
- Euphorbia platyrrhiza L.C.Leach (s)
- Euphorbia platysperma Engelm. ex S.Watson
- Euphorbia plebeia Boiss.
- Euphorbia plenispina S.Carter (s)
- Euphorbia plicata S.Watson
- Euphorbia plumerioides Teijsm. ex Hassk. (s)
- Euphorbia plummeriae S.Watson
- Euphorbia podadenia Boiss.
- Euphorbia podocarpifolia Urb. (s)
- Euphorbia poecilophylla (Prokh.) Prokh.
- Euphorbia poeppigii (Klotzsch & Garcke ex Klotzsch) Boiss.
- Euphorbia poissonii Pax (s)
- Euphorbia polyacantha Boiss. (s)
- Euphorbia polyantha Pax (s)
- Euphorbia polycarpa Benth.
- Euphorbia polycephala Marloth (s)
- Euphorbia polychroma Anton Josef Kerner - Cushion spurge; Cushion euphorbia (see also Euphorbia epithymoides)
- Euphorbia polycnemoides Hochst. ex Boiss.
- Euphorbia polygalifolia Boiss. & Reut. ex Boiss.
- Euphorbia polygona Haw. (s)
- Euphorbia polygonifolia L.
- Euphorbia polyphylla Engelm. ex Holz. - Lesser Florida spurge
- Euphorbia polytimetica (Prokh.) Prokh.
- Euphorbia ponderosa S.Carter (s)
- Euphorbia pondii Millsp.
- Euphorbia popayanensis Prokh.
- Euphorbia porphyrantha Phil. (s)
- Euphorbia porphyrastra Hand.-Mazz.
- Euphorbia porteriana (Small) Oudejans
  - Euphorbia porteriana var. keyensis (Small) Oudejans
  - Euphorbia porteriana var. porteriana
  - Euphorbia porteriana var. scoparia (Small) Oudejans
- Euphorbia portlandica L. - Portland spurge
- Euphorbia portucasadiana (Croizat) Subils
- Euphorbia portulacoides L. (s)
  - Euphorbia portulacoides subsp. collina (Phil.) Croizat (s)
  - Euphorbia portulacoides subsp. major (Müll.Arg.) Croizat (s)
  - Euphorbia portulacoides subsp. portulacoides (s)
- Euphorbia postii Boiss.
- Euphorbia potanii Prokh.
- Euphorbia potentilloides Boiss.
- Euphorbia potosina Fernald
- Euphorbia prieuriana Baillon
- Euphorbia primulifolia Baker (s)
  - Euphorbia primulifolia var. begardii Cremers (s)
  - Euphorbia primulifolia var. primulifolia (s)
- Euphorbia proballyana L.C.Leach (s)
  - Euphorbia proballyana var. multangula S.Carter (s)
  - Euphorbia proballyana var. proballyana (s)
- Euphorbia proctorii (D.G.Burch) Correll
- Euphorbia prolifera Buch.-Ham. ex D.Don
- Euphorbia promeocarpa P.H.Davis
- Euphorbia prona S.Carter (s)
- Euphorbia propingua N.E.Br.
- Euphorbia prostrata Aiton
  - Euphorbia prostrata subsp. caudirhiza Fosberg
  - Euphorbia prostrata subsp. prostrata
- Euphorbia przewalskii Prokh.
- Euphorbia psammophila Ule (s)
- Euphorbia pseudagraria P.A.Smirn.
- Euphorbia pseudoapios Maire & Weiller (s)
- Euphorbia pseudoburuana P.R.O.Bally & S.Carter (s)
- Euphorbia pseudocactus A.Berger (s)
- Euphorbia pseudodendroides H.Lindb.
- Euphorbia pseudoduseimata R.A.Dyer (s)
- Euphorbia pseudofalcata Chiov.
- Euphorbia pseudofulva Miranda
- Euphorbia pseudoglareosa Klokov
- Euphorbia pseudoglobosa Marloth (s)
- Euphorbia pseudograntii Pax (s)
- "Euphorbia pseudograntii" Bruyns 2006 (non Pax: preoccupied) (s) (= Synadenium grantii)
- Euphorbia pseudohirsuta Bruyns (s) (= Monadenium hirsutum)
- Euphorbia pseudohypogaea Dinter (s)
- Euphorbia pseudolaevis Bruyns (s) (= Monadenium laeve)
- Euphorbia pseudolucida Schur
- Euphorbia pseudomollis Bruyns (s) (= Synadenium molle)
- Euphorbia pseudonervosa Bruyns (s) (= Monadenium nervosum)
- Euphorbia pseudonudicaulis Bruyns (s) (= Monadenium nudicaule)
- Euphorbia pseudopetiolata Bruyns (s) (= Monadenium petiolatum)
- Euphorbia pseudoracemosa (P.R.O.Bally) Bruyns (s) (= Monadenium pseudoracemosum)
  - Euphorbia pseudoracemosa var. lorifolia (P.R.O.Bally) Bruyns (s) (= Monadenium pseudoracemosum var. lorifolium)
  - Euphorbia pseudoracemosa var. pseudoracemosa (s) (= Monadenium pseudoracemosum var. pseudoracemosum)
- Euphorbia pseudosikkimensis (Hurus. & Tanaka) Radcl.-Sm.
- Euphorbia pseudosimplex Bruyns (s) (= Monadenium simplex)
- Euphorbia pseudostellata Bruyns (s) (= Monadenium stellatum)
- Euphorbia pseudotrinervis Bruyns (s) (= Monadenium trinerve)
- Euphorbia pseudotuberosa Pax (s)
- Euphorbia pseudovolkensii Bruyns (s) (= Synadenium volkensii)
- Euphorbia pteroclada L.C.Leach (s)
- Euphorbia pterococca Brot.
- Euphorbia pteroneura A.Berger (s)
- Euphorbia pubentissima Michx. - False flowering spurge
- Euphorbia puberula Fernald
- Euphorbia pubicaulis S.Moore
- Euphorbia pubiglans N.E.Br. (s)
- Euphorbia pudibunda (P.R.O.Bally) Bruyns (s) (= Monadenium pudibundum)
- Euphorbia pudibunda var. lanata (S.Carter) Bruyns (s) (= Monadenium pudibundum var. lanatum)
- Euphorbia pudibunda var. rotundifolia (Malaysse & Lecron) Bruyns (s) (= Monadenium pudibundum var. rotundifolium)
- Euphorbia pudibunda var. pudibunda (s) (= Monadenium pudibundum var. pudibundum)
- Euphorbia pueblensis Brandegee
- Euphorbia pugniformis Boiss. (s)
- Euphorbia pulcherrima Willd. ex Klotzsch (s) - Poinsettia
- Euphorbia pulvinata Marloth (s) - Pincushion euphorbia
- Euphorbia pumicicola Huft
- Euphorbia punctata Delile
- Euphorbia punctulata Andersson
- Euphorbia punicea Sw. (s)
- Euphorbia purpurea (Raf.) Fernald - Darlington's glade spurge
- Euphorbia pusilla Lag.
- Euphorbia pycnostegia Boiss.
- Euphorbia pygmaea Ledeb.
- Euphorbia pyrenaica Jord.
- Euphorbia pyrifolia Lam. (s)
  - Euphorbia pyrifolia var. coriacea Radcl.-Sm. (s)
  - Euphorbia pyrifolia var. pyrifolia (s)

== Q ==
- Euphorbia qarad Deflers (s)
- Euphorbia quadrangularis Pax (s)
- Euphorbia quadrata Nel (s)
- Euphorbia quadrialata Pax (s)
- Euphorbia quadrilatera L.C.Leach (s)
- Euphorbia quadrispina S.Carter (s)
- Euphorbia quaitensis S.Carter (s)
- Euphorbia quartziticola Leandri (s)
- Euphorbia quinquecostata Volkens (s)
- Euphorbia quintasii Jord.
- Euphorbia quitensis Boiss.

== R ==
- Euphorbia radians Benth. (s) - Sun spurge
  - Euphorbia radians var. radians (s)
  - Euphorbia radians var. stormiae (Croizat) Rzed. & S.Calderón (s)
- Euphorbia radiifera L.C.Leach
- Euphorbia radioloides Boiss.
- Euphorbia ramiglans N.E.Br. (s)
- Euphorbia ramofraga Denis & Humbert ex Leandri (s)
- Euphorbia ramosa Seaton
- Euphorbia ramipressa Croizat
- Euphorbia ramulosa L.C.Leach (s)
- Euphorbia randrianjohanyi Haev. & Labat
- Euphorbia rangovalensis Leandri (s)
- Euphorbia raphanorrhiza (Millsp.) J.F.Macbr.
- Euphorbia raphilippii Oudejans
- Euphorbia rapulum Kar. & Kir. (s)
- Euphorbia rauhii Haev. & Labat
- Euphorbia razafindratsirae Lavranos (s)
- Euphorbia razafinjohanyi Ursch & Leandri (s)
- Euphorbia reboudiana Coss. ex Batt. & Trab.
- Euphorbia reclinata P.R.O.Bally & S.Carter (s)
- Euphorbia reconciliationis Radcl.-Sm.
- Euphorbia rectirama N.E.Br. (s)
- Euphorbia recurva Hook.f.
- Euphorbia refugii Croizat
- Euphorbia reghinii (Chiov.) Vollesen
- Euphorbia regis-jubae Webb & Berthel. (s)
- Euphorbia reineckei Pax ex Reinecke
- Euphorbia remyi A.Gray ex Boiss.
- Euphorbia reniformis Blume
- Euphorbia renneyi (S.Carter) Bruyns (s) (= Monadenium renneyi)
- Euphorbia repanda (Haw.) Sweet
- Euphorbia repens K.Koch
- Euphorbia repetita Hochst. ex A.Rich.
- Euphorbia reptans P.R.O.Bally & S.Carter (s)
- Euphorbia resinifera Berg (s) - Resin spurge
- Euphorbia restiacea Benth. (s)
- Euphorbia restituta N.E.Br. (s)
- Euphorbia restricta R.A.Dyer (s)
- Euphorbia retusa Forssk.
- Euphorbia retrospina Rauh & Gérold (s)
- Euphorbia reuteriana Boiss.
- Euphorbia revoluta Engelm.
- Euphorbia rhabdodes Boiss. (s)
- Euphorbia rhabdotosperma Radcl.-Sm.
- Euphorbia rhizophora (P.R.O.Bally) Bruyns (s) (= Monadenium rhizophorum)
- Euphorbia rhombifolia Boiss. (s)
- Euphorbia rhytidosperma Boiss. & Balansa ex Boiss.
- Euphorbia rhytisperma (Klotzsch & Garcke) Engelm. ex Boiss.
- Euphorbia richardsiae L.C.Leach (s)
  - Euphorbia richardsiae subsp. richardsiae (s)
  - Euphorbia richardsiae subsp. robusta L.C.Leach (s)
- Euphorbia riebeckii Pax (s)
- Euphorbia rigida M.Bieb. (s)
- Euphorbia rimarum Coss. & Balansa ex Coss.
- Euphorbia ritchiei (P.R.O.Bally) Bruyns (s) (= Monadenium ritchiei)
  - Euphorbia ritchiei subsp. marsabitensis (S.Carter) Bruyns (s) (= Monadenium ritchiei subsp. marsabitense)
  - Euphorbia ritchiei subsp. nyambensis (S.Carter) Bruyns (s) (= Monadenium ritchiei subsp. nyambense)
  - Euphorbia ritchiei subsp. ritchiei (s) (= Monadenium ritchiei subsp. ritchiei)
- Euphorbia rivae Pax (s)
- Euphorbia robecchii Pax (s)
- Euphorbia robivelonae Rauh (s)
- Euphorbia rochaensis (Croizat) Alonso Paz & Marchesi
- Euphorbia rockii C.N.Forbes
- Euphorbia rockii var. rockii C.N.Forbes
  - Euphorbia rockii var. grandiflora (Hillebrand) Oudejans
  - Euphorbia rockii var. rockii
- Euphorbia roemeriana Scheele - Roemer's spurge
- Euphorbia rohlenae Velen.
- Euphorbia roschanica (Ikonn.) Czerep.
- Euphorbia rosea Retz.
- Euphorbia roseana (Marn.-Lap. ex Demoly) J.-P.Castillon & J.-B.Castillon (s)
- Euphorbia rosescens E.L.Bridges & Orzell
- Euphorbia rossiana Pax (s)
- Euphorbia rossii Rauh & Buchloh (s)
- Euphorbia rosularis Al.Fed.
- Euphorbia rothiana Spreng.
- Euphorbia rothrockii (Millsp.) Oudejans
- Euphorbia rowlandii R.A.Dyer (s)
- Euphorbia royleana Boiss. (s) - Churee
- Euphorbia rubella Pax (s)
- Euphorbia rubriflora N.E.Br.
- Euphorbia rubromarginata L.E.Newton (s)
- Euphorbia rubriseminalis S.Carter (s)
- Euphorbia rubrispinosa S.Carter (s)
- Euphorbia rubrostriata Drake
- Euphorbia rudis N.E.Br. (s)
- Euphorbia rudolfii N.E.Br. (s)
- Euphorbia ruficeps S.Carter (s)
- Euphorbia rugosiflora L.C.Leach (s)
- Euphorbia ruizlealii Subils
- Euphorbia rupestris C.A.Mey. ex Ledeb.
- Euphorbia ruscifolia Boiss.
- Euphorbia ruscinonensis Boiss.
- Euphorbia rutilis (Millsp.) Standl. & Steyerm.
- Euphorbia rzedowskii McVaugh

== S ==
- Euphorbia sabulicola Boiss.
- Euphorbia saccharata Boiss.
- Euphorbia sachetiana (J.Florence) Govaerts
- Euphorbia sahendi Bornm.
- Euphorbia sajanensis (Boiss.) Baikov
- Euphorbia sakarahaensis Rauh (s)
- Euphorbia salicifolia Host
- Euphorbia salsicola S.Carter
- Euphorbia salota Leandri (s)
- Euphorbia salsuginosa (McVaugh) Radcl.-Sm. & Govaerts
- Euphorbia samburuensis P.R.O.Bally & S.Carter (s)
- Euphorbia sampsonii Hance
- Euphorbia sanasunitensis Hand.-Mazz.
- Euphorbia sancta Pax
- Euphorbia sanctaecatharinae A.A.Fayad
- Euphorbia sanmartensis Rusby
- Euphorbia santapaui A.N.Henry (s)
- Euphorbia sapiifolia Baillon
- Euphorbia sapinii De Wild. (s)
- Euphorbia sarawschanica Regel
- Euphorbia sarcodes Boiss. (s)
- Euphorbia sarcostemmatoides Dinter
- Euphorbia sarcostemmoides J.H.Willis (s)
- Euphorbia sareptana A.Becker
- Euphorbia sarmentosa Welw. ex Pax
- Euphorbia saurica Baikov
- Euphorbia saxatilis Jacq.
- Euphorbia saxicola Radcl.-Sm.
- Euphorbia saxorum P.R.O.Bally & S.Carter (s)
- Euphorbia scabrifolia S.Kurz
- Euphorbia scandens Kunth
- Euphorbia scarlatina S.Carter (s)
- Euphorbia scatorrhiza S.Carter (s)
- Euphorbia schaijesii (Malaisse) Bruyns (s) (= Monadenium schaijesii)
- Euphorbia scheffleri Pax (s)
- Euphorbia schickendantzii Hieron.
- Euphorbia schillingii Radcl.-Sm.
- Euphorbia schimperi C.Presl (s)
- Euphorbia schimperiana Scheele
  - Euphorbia schimperiana var. pubescens (N.E.Br.) S.Carter
  - Euphorbia schimperiana var. schimperiana
  - Euphorbia schimperiana var. velutina N.E.Br.
- Euphorbia schinzii Pax (s)
- Euphorbia schizacantha Pax (s)
- Euphorbia schizolepis F.Muell. ex Boiss.
- Euphorbia schizoloba Engelm.
- Euphorbia schlechtendalii Boiss. (s)
  - Euphorbia schlechtendalii var. pacifica McVaugh
  - Euphorbia schlechtendalii var. schlechtendalii
  - Euphorbia schlechtendalii var. websteri McVaugh
- Euphorbia schlechteri Pax
- Euphorbia schmitzii L.C.Leach (s)
- Euphorbia schoenlandii Pax (s)
- Euphorbia schottiana Boiss.
- Euphorbia schubei Pax (s) (= Monadenium schubei)
- Euphorbia schugnanica B.Fedtsch. ex O.Fedtsch. & B.Fedtsch. (s)
- Euphorbia schultzii Benth.
- Euphorbia schumannii Radcl.-Sm.
- Euphorbia schweinfurthii Balf.f. (s)
- Euphorbia sciadophila Boiss.
- Euphorbia scitula L.C.Leach (s)
- Euphorbia sclerocyathium Korovin & Popov
- Euphorbia sclerophylla Boiss.
- Euphorbia scopulorum Brandegee
- Euphorbia scordiifolia Jacq.
- Euphorbia scotanum Schltdl. (s)
- Euphorbia scripta Sommier & Levier
- Euphorbia scyphadena S.Carter (s)
- Euphorbia seclusa N.E.Br.
- Euphorbia sebsebei M.G.Gilbert (s)
- Euphorbia segetalis L. – Grainfield spurge
- Euphorbia segoviensis (Klotzsch & Garcke ex Klotzsch) Boiss.
- Euphorbia seguieriana Neck.
  - Euphorbia seguieriana subsp. loiseleurii (Rouy) Greuter & Burdet
  - Euphorbia seguieriana subsp. niciciana (Borbás ex J. Novák) Rech.f.
  - Euphorbia seguieriana subsp. seguieriana
    - Euphorbia seguieriana subsp. seguieriana var. arenivaga (Martin-Donos) Oudejans
    - Euphorbia seguieriana subsp. seguieriana var. dentata (Chabert) Oudejans
    - Euphorbia seguieriana subsp. seguieriana var. intermedia (S?vul.) Oudejans
    - Euphorbia seguieriana subsp. seguieriana var. lanceolata (Cariot) Oudejans
    - Euphorbia seguieriana subsp. seguieriana var. latifolia (J.J.Schmitz & Regel) Oudejans
    - Euphorbia seguieriana subsp. seguieriana var. seguieriana
    - Euphorbia seguieriana subsp. seguieriana var. sturii (Holuby) Oudejans
- Euphorbia seibanica Lavranos & A.N.Al-Gifri (s)
- Euphorbia sekukuniensis R.A.Dyer (s)
- Euphorbia seleri Donn.Sm.
- Euphorbia selloi (Klotzsch & Garcke ex Klotzsch) Boiss.
- Euphorbia selousiana S.Carter (s)
- Euphorbia semperflorens L.C.Leach (s)
- Euphorbia sendaica Makino
- Euphorbia senguptae Balakr. & Subram.
- Euphorbia senilis Standl. & Steyerm.
- Euphorbia sennenii Pau
- Euphorbia sennii Chiov. (s)
- Euphorbia septemsulcata Vierh. (s)
- Euphorbia septentrionalis P.R.O.Bally & S.Carter (s)
  - Euphorbia septentrionalis subsp. gamugofana M.G.Gilbert
  - Euphorbia septentrionalis subsp. septentrionalis
- Euphorbia sepulta P.R.O.Bally & S.Carter (s)
- Euphorbia seracomans Bubani
- Euphorbia serendipita L.E.Newton (s)
- Euphorbia seretii De Wild. (s)
  - Euphorbia seretii subsp. seretii
  - Euphorbia seretii subsp. variantissima L.C.Leach
- Euphorbia seriocarpa Hand.-Mazz.
- Euphorbia serpens Kunth
- Euphorbia serpentini Novak
- Euphorbia serpyllifolia Pers.
  - Euphorbia serpyllifolia subsp. hirtula (S.Watson) Oudejans
  - Euphorbia serpyllifolia subsp. serpyllifolia
- Euphorbia serrata L. – Serrated spurge, saw-toothed spurge
- Euphorbia serratifolia S.Carter
- Euphorbia serrula Engelm.
- Euphorbia sessei Oudejans
- Euphorbia sessiliflora Roxb. (s)
- Euphorbia sessilifolia Klotzsch ex Boiss.
- Euphorbia setiloba Engelm. ex Torr.
- Euphorbia setispina S.Carter (s)
- Euphorbia sewerzowii (Herd. ex Prokh.) N.V.Pavlov
- Euphorbia shaferi (Millsp.) L.G.Gonzáles & Bisse
- Euphorbia sharkoensis Baillon
- Euphorbia sharmae U.C.Battach.
- Euphorbia shebeliensis (M.G. Gilbert) Bruyns (s) (= Monadenium shebeliense)
- Euphorbia shouanensis H.Keng
- Euphorbia sieboldiana Morr. & Decne.
  - Euphorbia sieboldiana var. grandifolia (Franch. & Sav. ex Hurus.) Oudejans
  - Euphorbia sieboldiana var. idzuensis (Hurus.) Oudejans
  - Euphorbia sieboldiana var. ohsumiensis (Hurus.) Hatus.
  - Euphorbia sieboldiana var. peninsularis (Hurus.) M.Kitagawa
  - Euphorbia sieboldiana var. sieboldiana
  - Euphorbia sieboldiana var. sylvatica (Hurus.) Oudejans
- Euphorbia sikkimensis Boiss.
- Euphorbia silenifolia (Haw.) Sweet (s)
- Euphorbia similiramea S.Carter (s)
- Euphorbia sinclairiana Benth. (s) (= Euphorbia elata)
- Euphorbia sintenisii Boiss. ex J.Freyn
- Euphorbia sipolisii N.E.Br. (s)
- Euphorbia skottsbergii Sherff
- Euphorbia smallii Oudejans
- Euphorbia smirnovii Geltman
- Euphorbia smithii S.Carter (s)
- Euphorbia socotrana Balf.f. (s)
- Euphorbia sogdiana Popov
- Euphorbia sojakii (Chrtek & Křísa) Dubovik ex Dubovik et al.
- Euphorbia somalensis Pax (s)
- Euphorbia songweana S.Carter (s)
- Euphorbia sonorae Rose
- Euphorbia soobyi McVaugh
- Euphorbia soongarica Boiss.
- Euphorbia sororia Schrenk
- Euphorbia sparrmanii Boiss. (= Euphorbia ramosissima Hook. & Arn. non Loiseleur (nom. illeg.), Chamaesyce sparrmanii (Boissier) Hurusawa)
- Euphorbia sparsiflora A.Heller
- Euphorbia sparsiglandulosa J.Ponert
- Euphorbia spartaria N.E.Br. (s)
- Euphorbia spartiformis Mobayen
- Euphorbia spathulata Lam. – Roughpod spurge, warty spurge
  - Euphorbia spathulata var. mexicana (Engelm.) Oudejans
  - Euphorbia spathulata var. spathulata
- Euphorbia spathulifolia (Haw.) Steud.
- Euphorbia speciosa L.C.Leach (s)
- Euphorbia specksii Rauh (s)
- Euphorbia spectabilis (S.Carter) Bruyns (s) (= Monadenium spectabile)
- Euphorbia sphaerorrhiza Benth. (s)
- Euphorbia spicata E.Mey. ex Boiss. (s)
- Euphorbia spinea N.E.Br. (s)
- Euphorbia spinidens (Bornm. ex Prokh.) Prokh.
- Euphorbia spinosa L. (s)
  - Euphorbia spinosa subsp. ligustica (Fiori) Pignatti
  - Euphorbia spinosa subsp. spinosa
- Euphorbia spinulosa (S.Carter) Bruyns (s) (= Monadenium spinulosum)
- Euphorbia spiralis Balf.f. (s)
- Euphorbia spissiflora S.Carter
- Euphorbia spruceana Boiss.
- Euphorbia squamigera Loisel. (s)
- Euphorbia squamosa Willd.
  - Euphorbia squamosa var. serrata (Boiss.) Oudejans
  - Euphorbia squamosa var. squamosa
  - Euphorbia squamosa var. talyschensis (Boiss. & Buhse) Oudejans
  - Euphorbia squamosa var. wilhelmsiana (K.Koch) Oudejans
- Euphorbia squarrosa Haw.
- Euphorbia standleyi (Millsp.) Oudejans
- Euphorbia stapelioides Boiss. (s)
- Euphorbia stapfii A.Berger (s)
- Euphorbia stellata Willd. (s)
- Euphorbia stellispina (Haw.) (s)
  - Euphorbia stellispina var. astrispina (N.E.Br.) A.C.White, R.A.Dyer & B.Sloane
  - Euphorbia stellispina var. stellispina
- Euphorbia stenocaulis Bruyns (s)
- Euphorbia stenoclada Baillon (s)
  - Euphorbia stenoclada subsp. ambatofinandranae (Leandri) Cremers
  - Euphorbia stenoclada subsp. stenoclada
- Euphorbia stenophylla (Klotzsch & Garcke ex Klotzsch) Boiss.
- Euphorbia stepposa Zoz ex Prokh.
- Euphorbia stevenii F.M.Bailey (s)
- Euphorbia steyermarkii Standl. ex Standl. & Steyerm.
- Euphorbia strictospora Engelm.
- Euphorbia stoddartii Frosberg
- Euphorbia stolonifera Marloth ex A.C.White, R.A.Dyer & B.Sloane (s)
- Euphorbia stracheyi Boiss.
- Euphorbia strangulata N.E.Br. (s)
  - Euphorbia strangulata subsp. deminuens L.C.Leach
  - Euphorbia strangulata subsp. strangulata
- Euphorbia striata Thunb. (s)
- Euphorbia stricta L.
- Euphorbia strictior Holz. – Panhandle spurge
- Euphorbia strigosa Hook. & Arn. (s)
- Euphorbia stygiana H.C.Watson (s)
  - Euphorbia stygiana subsp. santamariae H.Schäf.
  - Euphorbia stygiana subsp. stygiana
- Euphorbia subcordata C.A.Mey. ex Ledeb.
- Euphorbia subhastifolia Klokov ex Dubovik & Klokov
- Euphorbia submammillaris (A.Berger) A.Berger (s)
- Euphorbia subpeltata S.Watson
- Euphorbia subpeltatophylla Rauh (s)
- Euphorbia subreniformis S.Watson
- Euphorbia subsalsa Hiern (s)
  - Euphorbia subsalsa subsp. fluvialis L.C.Leach
  - Euphorbia subsalsa subsp. subsalsa
- Euphorbia subscandens P.R.O.Bally & S.Carter (s)
- Euphorbia subterminalis N.E.Br.
- Euphorbia subtrifoliata Rusby
- Euphorbia subulatifolia Hurus.
- Euphorbia succedanea L.C.Wheeler
- Euphorbia sudanica A.Chev. (s)
- Euphorbia suffulta P.Bruyns (s)
- Euphorbia sulcata De Lens ex Loisel.
  - Euphorbia sulcata subsp. maroccana Molero, Rovira & J.Vicens.
  - Euphorbia sulcata subsp. sulcata
- Euphorbia sultan-hassei Strid, B.Bentzer, R.von Bothmer, L.Engstrand & M.Gustafsson (s)
- Euphorbia sumati S.Carter (s)
- Euphorbia sumbawensis Boiss.
- Euphorbia superans Nel (s)
- Euphorbia suppressa Marx (s)
- Euphorbia surinamensis Lanj.
- Euphorbia susanholmesiae Binojk. & Gopalan (s)
- Euphorbia susannae Marloth (s) – Suzanne's spurge
- Euphorbia suzannaemarnierae Rauh & Pétignat (s)
- Euphorbia synadenium Ridl. (s)
- Euphorbia syncalycina Bruyns (s) (= Synadenium calycinum)
- Euphorbia syncameronii Bruyns (s) (= Synadenium cameronii)
- Euphorbia systyla Edgew.
- Euphorbia systyloides Pax
  - Euphorbia systyloides subsp. porcaticapsa S.Carter
  - Euphorbia systyloides subsp. systyloides
- Euphorbia szechuanica Pax & K.Hoffmann
- Euphorbia szovitsii Fisch. & C.A.Mey.

== T ==
- Euphorbia taboraensis A.Hässl. (s)
- Euphorbia tacnensis Phil.
- Euphorbia taihsiensis (Chaw & Koutnik) Oudejans
- Euphorbia taitensis Boiss.
- Euphorbia taiwaniana S.S.Ying
- Euphorbia talaina Radcl.-Sm.
- Euphorbia talastavica (Prokh.) Prokh.
- Euphorbia taluticola Wiggins
- Euphorbia tamanduana Boiss.
- Euphorbia tamaulipasana (Millsp.) Oudejans
- Euphorbia tanaensis (s)
- Euphorbia tanaitica Paczoski
- Euphorbia tannensis Spreng. (s)
  - Euphorbia tannensis subsp. eremophila (A.Cunn.) D.C.Hassall
  - Euphorbia tannensis subsp. tannensis
- Euphorbia tanquahuete Sessé & Moc. (s)
- Euphorbia tarapacana Phil.
- Euphorbia tardieuana (s)
- Euphorbia tarokoensis Hayata
- Euphorbia taruensis S.Carter (s)
- Euphorbia tashiroi Hayata
- Euphorbia tauricola Prokh.
- Euphorbia taurinensis All.
  - Euphorbia taurinensis var. brachyceras (P.Candargy) Oudejans
  - Euphorbia taurinensis var. isophylla (K.Malý) Oudejans
  - Euphorbia taurinensis var. taurinensis
- Euphorbia taxifolia Burm.f.
- Euphorbia tchenngoi (Soják) Radcl.-Sm.
- Euphorbia teheranica Boiss.
- Euphorbia tehuacana (Millsp.) & V.W.Steinm. (= Pedilanthus tehuacanus) (s)
- Euphorbia teixeirae L.C.Leach (s)
- Euphorbia teke Pax (s)
- Euphorbia telephioides Chapm. – Telephus spurge
- Euphorbia tenax W.J.Burchell (s)
- Euphorbia tenera S.Watson
- Euphorbia tenuirama Schweinf. ex A.Berger (s)
- Euphorbia tenuispinosa Gilli (s)
  - Euphorbia tenuispinosa var. robusta P.R.O.Bally & S.Carter
  - Euphorbia tenuispinosa var. tenuispinosa
- Euphorbia terracina L. – Geraldton carnation weed
  - Euphorbia terracina var. alexandrina (Delile) Z.El-Karemy
  - Euphorbia terracina var. terracina
- Euphorbia tescorum S.Carter (s)
- Euphorbia teskensuensis A.O.Orazova
- Euphorbia tessmannii Mansf.
- Euphorbia tetracantha Rendle (s)
- Euphorbia tetracanthoides Pax (s)
- Euphorbia tetragona Haw. (s)
- Euphorbia tetrapora Engelm. – Weak spurge
- Euphorbia tetraptera
- Euphorbia tettensis Klotzsch
- Euphorbia tetuanensis Pau
- Euphorbia texana Boiss. – Texas spurge
- Euphorbia therica L.C.Wheeler
- Euphorbia thinophila Phil. (s)
- Euphorbia tholicola L.C.Leach (s)
- Euphorbia thompsonii Holmboe
- Euphorbia thomsoniana Boiss.
- Euphorbia thouarsiana (s)
- Euphorbia thulinii (s)
- Euphorbia thymifolia L. (= Chamaesyce thymifolia)
- Euphorbia thyrsoidea Boiss.
- Euphorbia tianshanica Prokh. & Popov
- Euphorbia tibetica Boiss.
- Euphorbia tinianensis Hosok.
- Euphorbia tirucalli – Indian tree spurge, milk bush, pencil tree (s)
- Euphorbia tisserantii A.Chev. R.Sillans ex A.Chev.
- Euphorbia tithymaloides L. (= Pedilanthus tithymaloides) – "Devil's backbone", "redbird cactus", cimora misha (Peru) (s)
  - Euphorbia tithymaloides subsp. angustifolia (Poit.) V.W.Steinm. (= Pedilanthus tithymaloides subsp. angustifolius)
  - Euphorbia tithymaloides subsp. bahamensis (Millsp.) V.W.Steinm. (= Pedilanthus tithymaloides subsp. bahamensis)
  - Euphorbia tithymaloides subsp. jamaicensis (Millsp. & Britton) V.W.Steinm. (= Pedilanthus tithymaloides subsp. jamaicensis)
  - Euphorbia tithymaloides subsp. padifolia (L.) V.W.Steinm. (= Pedilanthus tithymaloides subsp. padifolius)
  - Euphorbia tithymaloides subsp. parasitica (Klotzsch. & Garcke) V.W.Steinm. (= Pedilanthus tithymaloides subsp. parasiticus)
  - Euphorbia tithymaloides subsp. retusa (Benth.) V.W.Steinm. (= Pedilanthus tithymaloides subsp. retusus)
  - Euphorbia tithymaloides subsp. smallii (Millsp.) V.W.Steinm. (= Pedilanthus tithymaloides subsp. smallii)
  - Euphorbia tithymaloides subsp. tithymaloides (= Pedilanthus tithymaloides subsp. tithymaloides)
- Euphorbia tlapanensis Hargreaves
- Euphorbia togakusensis Hayata
- Euphorbia tomentella Engelm. ex Boiss.
- Euphorbia tomentulosa S.Watson (s)
- Euphorbia torralbasii Urb.
- Euphorbia torrei (L.C.Leach) Bruyns (= Monadenium torrei) (s)
- Euphorbia torta Pax & K.Hoffmann (s)
- Euphorbia tortilis Rottler ex W.Ainslie (s)
- Euphorbia tortirama R.A.Dyer (s)
- Euphorbia tortistyla N.E.Br. (s)
- Euphorbia tozzii Chiov.
- Euphorbia trachysperma Engelm.
- Euphorbia trancapatae (Croizat) J.F.Macbr.
- Euphorbia transoxana (Prokh.) Prokh.
- Euphorbia transtagana Boiss.
- Euphorbia transvaalensis Schltr. (s)
- Euphorbia tranzschelii (Prokh.) Prokh.
- Euphorbia triangolensis Bruyns (= Synadenium angolense) (s)
- Euphorbia triaculeata Forssk. (s)
- Euphorbia trialata (Huft) V.W.Steinm.
- Euphorbia triangularis Desf. ex A.Berger (s)
- Euphorbia trichadenia Pax (s)
  - Euphorbia trichadenia var. gibbsiae N.E.Br.
  - Euphorbia trichadenia var. trichadenia
- Euphorbia trichiocyma S.Carter
- Euphorbia trichocardia L.B.Sm.
- Euphorbia trichophylla Baker
- Euphorbia trichotoma Kunth – Sanddune spurge
- Euphorbia tricolor Greenm.
- Euphorbia tridentata Lam. (s)
- Euphorbia triflora Schott, Nyman & Kotschy
- Euphorbia trigona Mill. – African milk tree (s)
- Euphorbia triloba Sessé & Moc.
- Euphorbia trinervia Schumach.
- Euphorbia triodonta (Prokh.) Prokh.
- Euphorbia tripartita S.Carter (s)
- Euphorbia triphylla (Klotzsch & Garcke ex Klotzsch) Oudejans
- Euphorbia troyana Urb.
- Euphorbia tshuiensis (Prokh.) Sergievsk. ex Krylov
- Euphorbia tsimbazazae Leandri
- Euphorbia tuberculata Jacq. (s)
  - Euphorbia tuberculata var. macowanii A.C.White, R.A.Dyer & B.Sloane
  - Euphorbia tuberculata var. tuberculata
- Euphorbia tuberculatoides N.E.Br. (s)
- Euphorbia tuberifera N.E.Br. (s)
- Euphorbia tuberosa L. (s)
- Euphorbia tubiglans Marloth ex. R.A.Dyer (s)
- Euphorbia tuckeyana Steud. ex P.B.Webb (s)
- Euphorbia tuerckheimii Urb.
- Euphorbia tugelensis N.E.Br. (s)
- Euphorbia tulearensis (s)
- Euphorbia tumbaensis De Wild.
- Euphorbia tumistyla (D.G.Burch) Radcl.-Sm.
- Euphorbia tunetana (Murbeck) Vierh. ex F.Buxbaum
- Euphorbia turbiniformis Chiov. (s)
- Euphorbia turczaninowii Kar. & Kir.
- Euphorbia turkanensis S.Carter (s)
- Euphorbia turkestanica Regel
- Euphorbia turpinii Boiss.
- Euphorbia tyraica Klokov & Artemcz. ex Klokov

== U ==
- Euphorbia ugandensis Pax & K.Hoffmann ex Pax
- Euphorbia uhligiana Pax (s)
- Euphorbia uliginosa Welw. ex Boiss.;
- Euphorbia umbellulata Engelm. ex Boiss.
- Euphorbia umbonata S.Carter (s)
- Euphorbia umbraculiformis Rauh (s)
- Euphorbia umbrosa Bert. ex Spreng.
- Euphorbia umfoloziensis R.G.Peckover (s)
- Euphorbia undulata M.Bieb.
- Euphorbia undulatifolia Janse (s)
- Euphorbia unicornis R.A.Dyer (s)
- Euphorbia uniglandulosa S.Watson
- Euphorbia uniglans M.G.Gilbert (s)
- Euphorbia unispina N.E.Br. (s)
- Euphorbia uralensis Fisch. ex Link
- Euphorbia urbanii (Millsp.) Oudejans
- Euphorbia urceolophora Parodi
- Euphorbia usambarica Pax (s)
  - Euphorbia usambarica subsp. elliptica Pax (s)
  - Euphorbia usambarica subsp. usambarica (s)
- Euphorbia uzmuk S.Carter & J.R.I.Wood (s)

== V ==
- Euphorbia vaalputsiana L.C.Leach (s)
- Euphorbia vachellii Hook. & Arn.
- Euphorbia vaginulata Griseb (s)
- Euphorbia vajravelui Binojk. & N.P.Balakr. (s)
- Euphorbia valerianifolia Lam.
- Euphorbia valerii Standl.
- Euphorbia vallaris L.C.Leach (s)
- Euphorbia valliniana Belli
- Euphorbia vallismortuae (Millsp.) Howell
- Euphorbia vandermerwei R.A.Dyer (s)
- Euphorbia variabilis Ces.
- Euphorbia vauthieriana Boiss.
- Euphorbia vedica S.Ter-Chatschat.
- Euphorbia velleriflora (Klotzsch & Garcke ex Klotzsch) Boiss.
- Euphorbia velligera S.Schauer ex Nees & S.Schauer
- Euphorbia venenata Marloth (s)
- Euphorbia venenifica Kotschy ex Boiss. (s)
- Euphorbia veneris M.S.Khan
- Euphorbia veneta Willd.
- Euphorbia venteri L.C.Leach ex R.H.Archer & S.Carter (s)
- Euphorbia verapazensis Standl. & Steyerm. (s)
- Euphorbia vermiculata Raf.
- Euphorbia verrucosa L.
- Euphorbia verruculosa N.E.Br. (s)
- Euphorbia versicolores G.Will. (s)
- Euphorbia vervoorstii Subils
- Euphorbia vestita Boiss.
- Euphorbia vezorum Leandri
- Euphorbia viatilis Ule
- Euphorbia viduiflora L.C.Leach (s)
- Euphorbia viguieri Denis (s)
  - Euphorbia viguieri var. ankarafantsiensis Ursch & Leandri
  - Euphorbia viguieri var. capuroniana Ursch & Leandri
  - Euphorbia viguieri var. tsimbazazae Ursch & Leandri
  - Euphorbia viguieri var. viguieri
  - Euphorbia viguieri var. vilanandrensis Ursch & Leandri
- Euphorbia villifera Scheele
- Euphorbia villosa Waldst. & Kit. ex Willd.
  - Euphorbia villosa subsp. semivillosa (Prokh.) Oudejans
  - Euphorbia villosa subsp. valdevillosocarpa (Arvat. & Nyar.) R.Turner
  - Euphorbia villosa subsp. villosa
- Euphorbia viminea Hook.f.
- Euphorbia violacea Greenm.
- Euphorbia virgata Waldst. & Kit.
- Euphorbia viridis (Klotzsch & Garcke ex Klotzsch) Boiss.
- Euphorbia viridula Cordemoy ex Radcl.-Sm.
- Euphorbia virosa Willd. (s)
  - Euphorbia virosa subsp. arenicola L.C.Leach
  - Euphorbia virosa subsp. virosa
- Euphorbia viscoides Boiss.
- Euphorbia vittata S.Carter (s)
- Euphorbia volgensis Kryshtof.
- Euphorbia volhynica Besser ex M.Raciborski
- Euphorbia volkii Rech.f.
- Euphorbia volkmanniae Dinter (s)
- Euphorbia vulcanorum S.Carter (s)

== W ==
- Euphorbia wakefieldii N.E.Br. (s)
- Euphorbia waldsteinii (Soják) Radcl.-Sm.
  - Euphorbia waldsteinii var. jaxartica (Prokh.) Oudejans
  - Euphorbia waldsteinii var. orientalis (Boiss.) Oudejans
  - Euphorbia waldsteinii var. saratoi (Ardoino) Oudejans
  - Euphorbia waldsteinii var. waldsteinii
- Euphorbia wallichii Hook.f.
- Euphorbia wangii Oudejans
- Euphorbia waringiae Rauh & R.Gerold (s)
- Euphorbia waterbergensis R.A.Dyer (s)
- Euphorbia weberbaueri R.Mansfeld (s)
- Euphorbia wellbyi N.E.Br.
- Euphorbia wellbyi var. wellbyi
- Euphorbia wellbyi var. glabra S.Carter
- Euphorbia welwitschii Boiss. & Reut.
- Euphorbia wheeleri Baillon
- Euphorbia whellanii L.C.Leach (s)
- Euphorbia whyteana Baker f.
- Euphorbia wildii L.C.Leach (s)
- Euphorbia williamsonii L.C.Leach (s)
- Euphorbia wilmaniae Marloth (s)
- Euphorbia wilsonii (Millsp.) Correll
- Euphorbia wittmannii Boiss.
- Euphorbia woodii N.E.Br. (s)
- Euphorbia wootonii Oudejans
- Euphorbia woronowii Grossh.
- Euphorbia wrightii Torr. & A.Gray (s) - Wright's spurge

== X ==
- Euphorbia xalapensis Kunth
- Euphorbia xanthadenia Denis (s)
- Euphorbia xanti Engelm. ex Boiss. (s)
- Euphorbia xbacensis Millsp.
- Euphorbia xeropoda Brandegee
- Euphorbia xylacantha Pax (s)
- Euphorbia xylopoda Greenm.

== Y ==
- Euphorbia yadgirensis Sarojin & Raja Kullayisw
- Euphorbia yamashitae Kitam.
- Euphorbia yajinensis W.T.Wang
- Euphorbia yaroslavii P.P.Poljakov
- Euphorbia yattana (P.R.O.Bally) Bruyns (s) (= Monadenium yattanum)
- Euphorbia yayalesia Urb.
- Euphorbia yemenica Boiss.
- Euphorbia yinshanica S.Q.Zhou
- Euphorbia yucatanensis (Millsp.) Standl.

== Z ==
- Euphorbia zakamenae Leandri (s)
- Euphorbia zambesiana Benth. (s)
  - Euphorbia zambesiana var. benguelensis (Pax) N.E.Br. (s)
  - Euphorbia zambesiana var. zambesiana (s)
- Euphorbia zeylana N.E.Br.
- Euphorbia zierioides Boiss.
- Euphorbia zornioides Boiss.
- Euphorbia zoutpansbergensis R.A.Dyer (s)
