= Euphorbia trichophylla =

Conservation status
- Vulnerable (IUCN 3.1)

Scientific classification
- Kingdom: Plantae
- Clade: Tracheophytes
- Clade: Angiosperms
- Clade: Eudicots
- Clade: Rosids
- Order: Malpighiales
- Family: Euphorbiaceae
- Genus: Euphorbia
- Species: E. trichophylla

Binomial name
- Euphorbia trichophylla Baker

Synonyms
- Euphorbia anagalloides Baker

Species of plant

Euphorbia trichophylla is a species of plant in the family Euphorbiaceae. It is endemic to Madagascar. Its natural habitats are subtropical or tropical high-altitude grassland and rocky areas. It is threatened by habitat loss.
