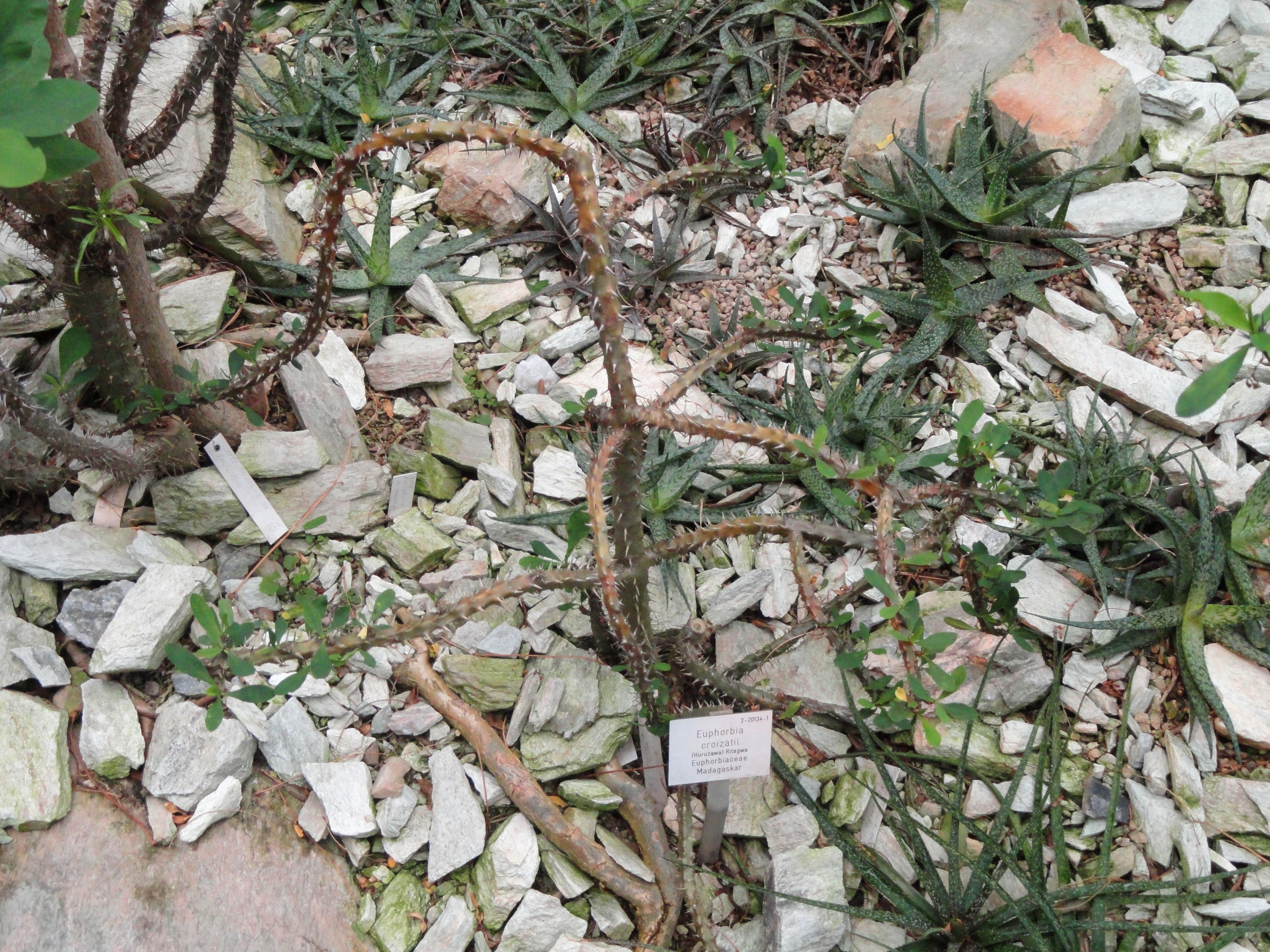

Conservation status
- Vulnerable (IUCN 3.1)

Scientific classification
- Kingdom: Plantae
- Clade: Tracheophytes
- Clade: Angiosperms
- Clade: Eudicots
- Clade: Rosids
- Order: Malpighiales
- Family: Euphorbiaceae
- Genus: Euphorbia
- Species: E. xanthadenia

Binomial name
- Euphorbia xanthadenia Denis

Synonyms
- Euphorbia croizatii; Euphorbia ebeloensis; Euphorbia emiliennae; Euphorbia emilienneae; Euphorbia helenae

= Euphorbia xanthadenia =

Plant species in the spurge family

Euphorbia xanthadenia is a rare, disputed species from southern Madagascar.

== Description ==
Euphorbia xanthadenia is a mound shaped plant usually growing 70–100 centimeters tall, though on occasion growing as tall as 150 cm, with a width of about 100 cm. It is a succulent species with an appearance somewhat like a small tree with the main stalk and branches covered in 0.5 to 1.5 centimeter long thorns. The narrow leaves are only found near the ends of the stems and branches. The inflorescences are also found at the tips of the plant's branches.

== Taxonomy ==
Euphorbia xanthadenia was named and scientifically described in 1921 by Marcel Denis. It is classified in the genus Euphorbia within the Euphorbiaceae family. In many sources it is described as variety of Euphorbia mahafalensis following the 1946 description by Jacques Désiré Leandri, but in 2021 Haevermans and Hetterscheid supported the original description of it as a species by Denis. It is listed as an accepted species by Plants of the World Online (POWO) and the entry in the IUCN Red List is also for a species. E. mahafalensis has round branches while the branches of E. xanthadenia are angular when examined in cross section. The species has no accepted varieties, but it has six synonyms in POWO.

Table of synonyms
Name	Year	Rank	Notes
Euphorbia croizatii Leandri	1946	species	= het.
Euphorbia ebeloensis Rebmann	2017	species	= het.
Euphorbia emiliennae Rebmann	2017	species	= het., not validly publ.
Euphorbia emilienneae Rebmann	2017	species	= het., without page number.
Euphorbia helenae Rebmann	2016	species	= het., nom. illeg., homonym. post.
Euphorbia mahafalensis var. xanthadenia (Denis) Leandri	1946	variety	≡ hom.
Notes: ≡ homotypic synonym; = heterotypic synonym

== Range and habitat ==
It is endemic to southern Madagascar in rocky areas of the inland mountains and cliffs.
