= Euphorbia salota =

Conservation status
- Vulnerable (IUCN 3.1)

Scientific classification
- Kingdom: Plantae
- Clade: Tracheophytes
- Clade: Angiosperms
- Clade: Eudicots
- Clade: Rosids
- Order: Malpighiales
- Family: Euphorbiaceae
- Genus: Euphorbia
- Species: E. salota

Binomial name
- Euphorbia salota Leandri

Species of flowering plant

Euphorbia salota is a species of flowering plant in the family Euphorbiaceae. It is endemic to Madagascar. It is threatened by habitat loss. It is a semi-succulent shrub that grows mostly in the desert or arid shrubland environment.
