= Euphorbia subpeltata =

Scientific classification
- Kingdom: Plantae
- Clade: Tracheophytes
- Clade: Angiosperms
- Clade: Eudicots
- Clade: Rosids
- Order: Malpighiales
- Family: Euphorbiaceae
- Genus: Euphorbia
- Species: E. subpeltata

Binomial name
- Euphorbia subpeltata S.Watson

Synonyms
- Eumecanthus digitatus (S.Watson) Millsp.; Eumecanthus subpeltatus (S.Watson) Millsp.; Euphorbia digitata S.Watson

Species of plant

Euphorbia subpeltata is a species of plant in the family Euphorbiaceae. It is endemic to Mexico.
