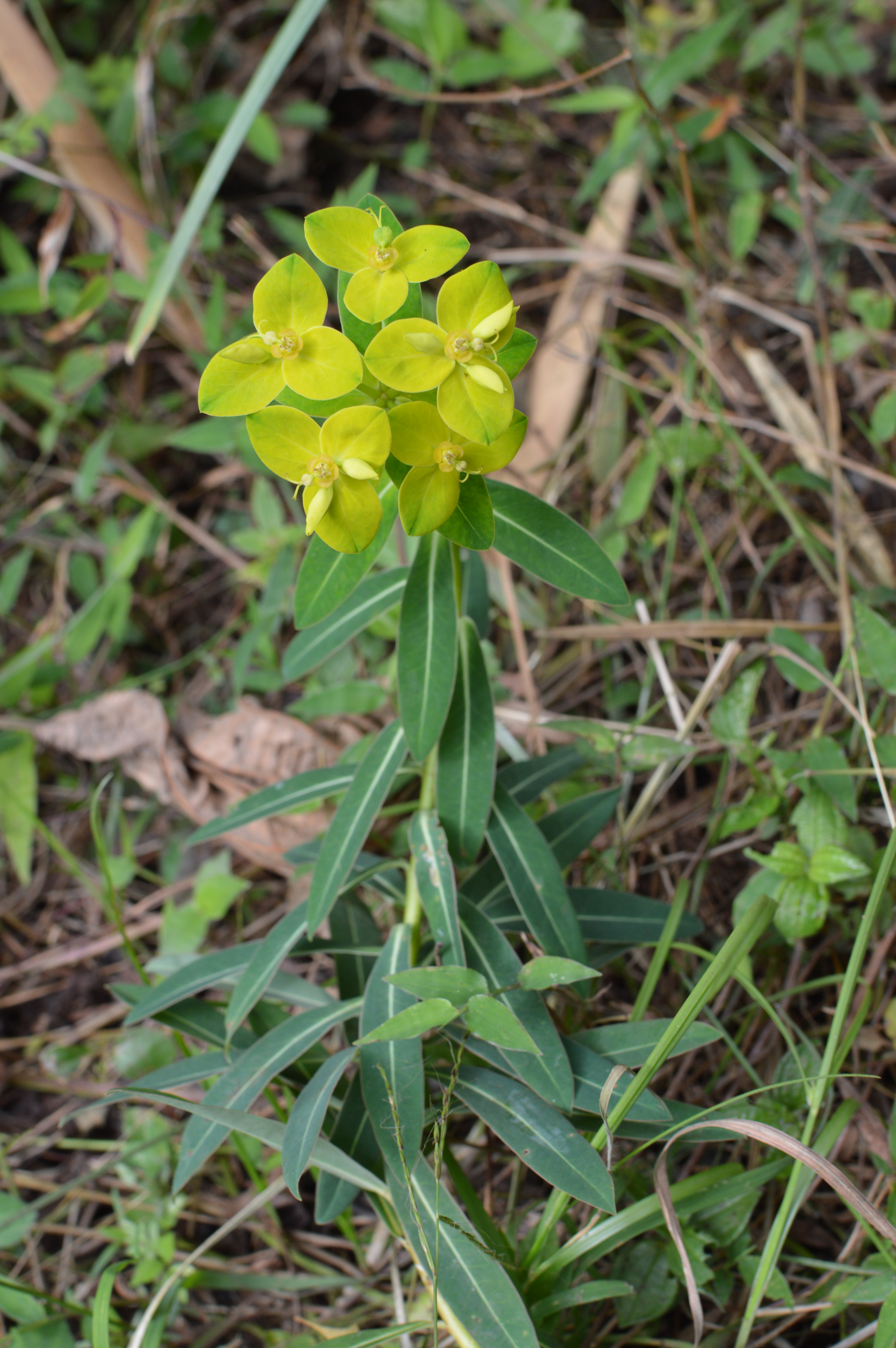
- Flowering individual, Kanchenjunga Conservation Area, Nepal

Scientific classification
- Kingdom: Plantae
- Clade: Tracheophytes
- Clade: Angiosperms
- Clade: Eudicots
- Clade: Rosids
- Order: Malpighiales
- Family: Euphorbiaceae
- Genus: Euphorbia
- Species: E. wallichii

Binomial name
- Euphorbia wallichii Hook.f.

= Euphorbia wallichii =

Species of flowering plant

Euphorbia wallichii, the Wallich spurge (Nepali: डुक), is a species of plant in the family Euphorbiaceae indigenous to the Himalaya, growing from Pakistan to Yunnan at elevations between 2300–3700 m.
