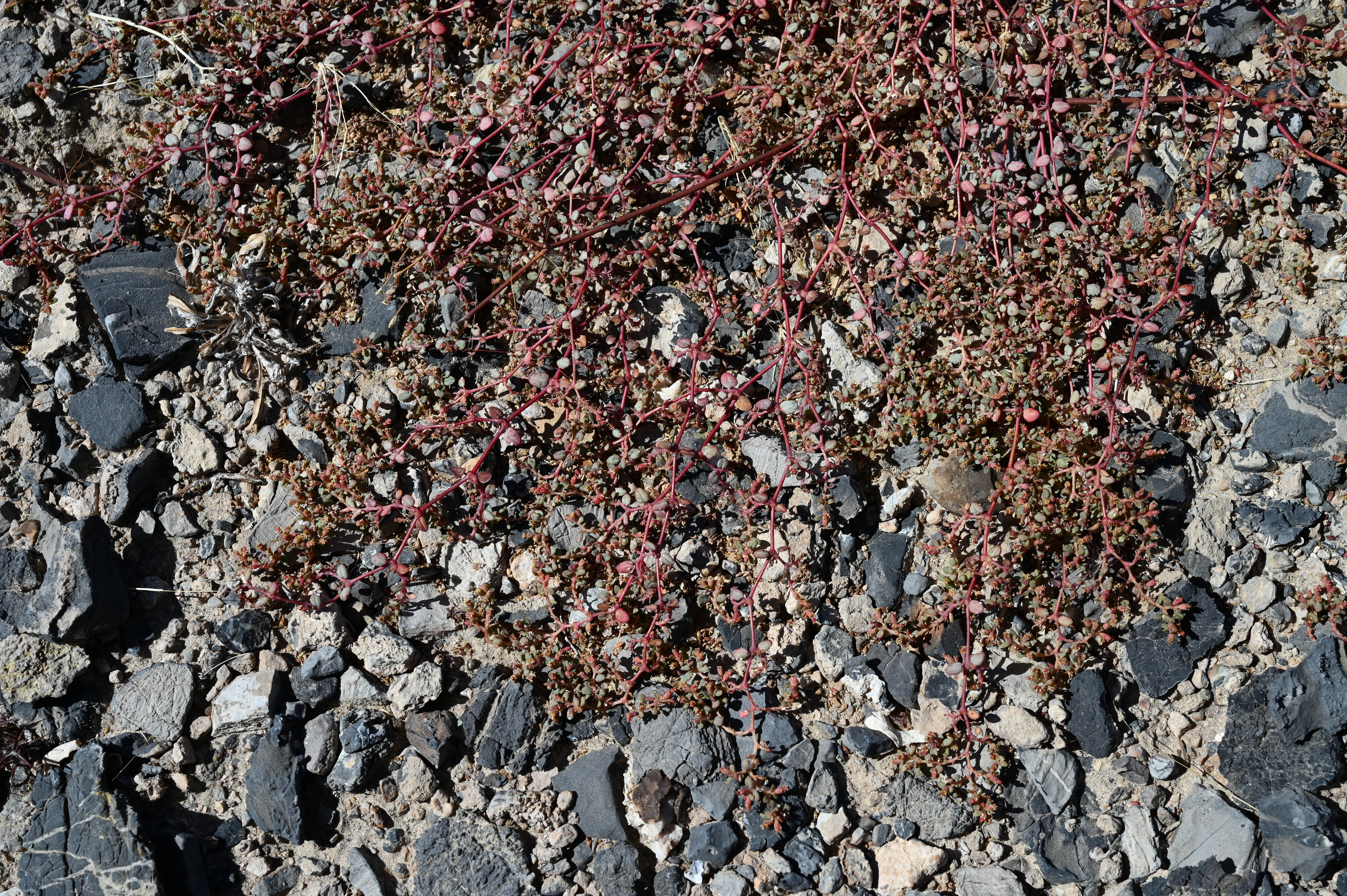

Scientific classification
- Kingdom: Plantae
- Clade: Tracheophytes
- Clade: Angiosperms
- Clade: Eudicots
- Clade: Rosids
- Order: Malpighiales
- Family: Euphorbiaceae
- Genus: Euphorbia
- Species: E. parishii

Binomial name
- Euphorbia parishii Greene

Synonyms
- Chamaesyce parishii

= Euphorbia parishii =

Species of flowering plant

Euphorbia parishii, known by the common name Parish's sandmat, is a species of euphorb. It is native to the sandy soils of the deserts in California and Nevada. It is a perennial herb forming a small patch on the ground. The slender, hairless, tangling stems have pairs of tiny, pointed oval leaves, each leaf just a few millimeters long. The minute inflorescence is a cyathium one millimeter wide. It is made up of several rounded nectar glands in shades of yellow to deep red surrounding many tiny male flowers and one female flower. The latter develops into a spherical fruit two millimeters wide.
