= Euphorbia rangovalensis =

Conservation status
- Least Concern (IUCN 3.1)

Scientific classification
- Kingdom: Plantae
- Clade: Tracheophytes
- Clade: Angiosperms
- Clade: Eudicots
- Clade: Rosids
- Order: Malpighiales
- Family: Euphorbiaceae
- Genus: Euphorbia
- Species: E. rangovalensis

Binomial name
- Euphorbia rangovalensis Leandri

Synonyms
- Euphorbia castillonii Lavranos

Species of flowering plant

Euphorbia rangovalensis is a species of flowering plant in the family Euphorbiaceae. It is endemic to Madagascar. Its natural habitats are subtropical or tropical moist lowland forests and subtropical or tropical moist montane forests. It is threatened by habitat loss.
