= Euphorbia quitensis =

Conservation status
- Critically Endangered (IUCN 3.1)

Scientific classification
- Kingdom: Plantae
- Clade: Embryophytes
- Clade: Tracheophytes
- Clade: Spermatophytes
- Clade: Angiosperms
- Clade: Eudicots
- Clade: Rosids
- Order: Malpighiales
- Family: Euphorbiaceae
- Genus: Euphorbia
- Species: E. quitensis

Binomial name
- Euphorbia quitensis Boiss. in A.P.de Candolle

Synonyms
- Chamaesyce quitensis (Boiss.) G.L.Webster

Species of flowering plant

Euphorbia quitensis is a species of plant in the family Euphorbiaceae. It is endemic to Ecuador. Its natural habitat is subtropical or tropical moist montane forests.
