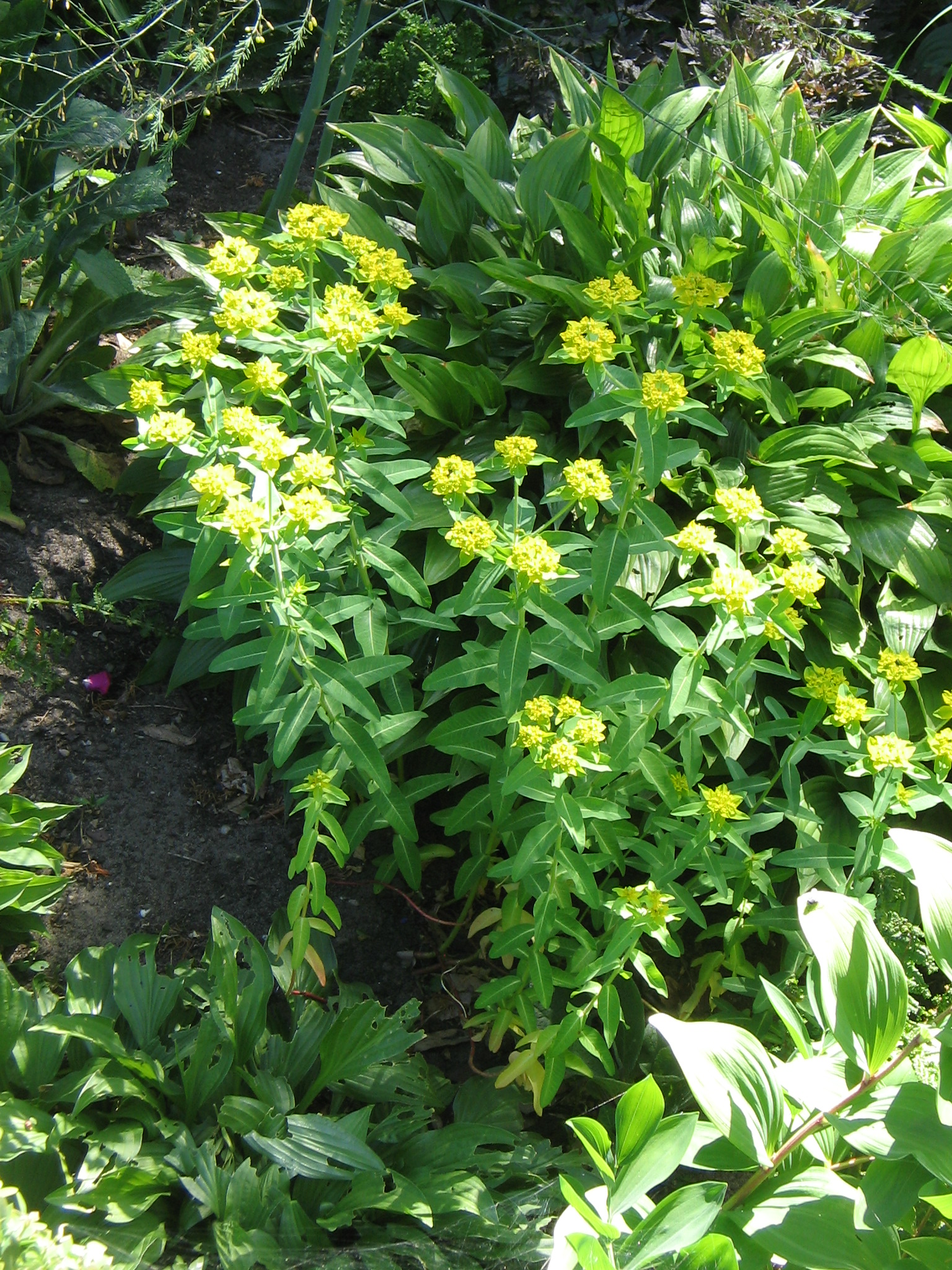

Scientific classification
- Kingdom: Plantae
- Clade: Tracheophytes
- Clade: Angiosperms
- Clade: Eudicots
- Clade: Rosids
- Order: Malpighiales
- Family: Euphorbiaceae
- Genus: Euphorbia
- Species: E. schillingii

Binomial name
- Euphorbia schillingii Radcl. -Sm.

= Euphorbia schillingii =

Species of flowering plant

Euphorbia schillingii, or Schilling spurge, is a species of flowering plant in the spurge family Euphorbiaceae, native to Nepal. Growing to 1 m (3.3 ft) tall by 0.5 m (1.6 ft) broad, it is an herbaceous perennial bearing long, narrow leaves with a prominent white midrib, and clusters of long-lasting lime-green flowers throughout summer into autumn. The flowers are useful in flower arranging.

The Latin specific epithet schillingii honours its finder, the plant hunter Tony Schilling (born 1935).

In cultivation it grows best in rich, moist soil in a partially-shaded location. It is hardy down to −15 °C (5 °F) (surviving even harsh winters in the UK) reflecting its origin in the Himalayas. It has gained the Royal Horticultural Society's Award of Garden Merit.

All euphorbias are toxic if ingested, and produce an irritant milky sap when cut or broken.
