= Murbeck =

Murbeck is a Swedish surname. Notable people with the surname include:

- Andreas Murbeck (born 1998), Swedish footballer
- Peter Murbeck (1708–1766), Swedish priest, pietist, and famous preacher
- Svante Samuel Murbeck (1859–1946), Swedish professor, botanist, pteridologist, and explorer
