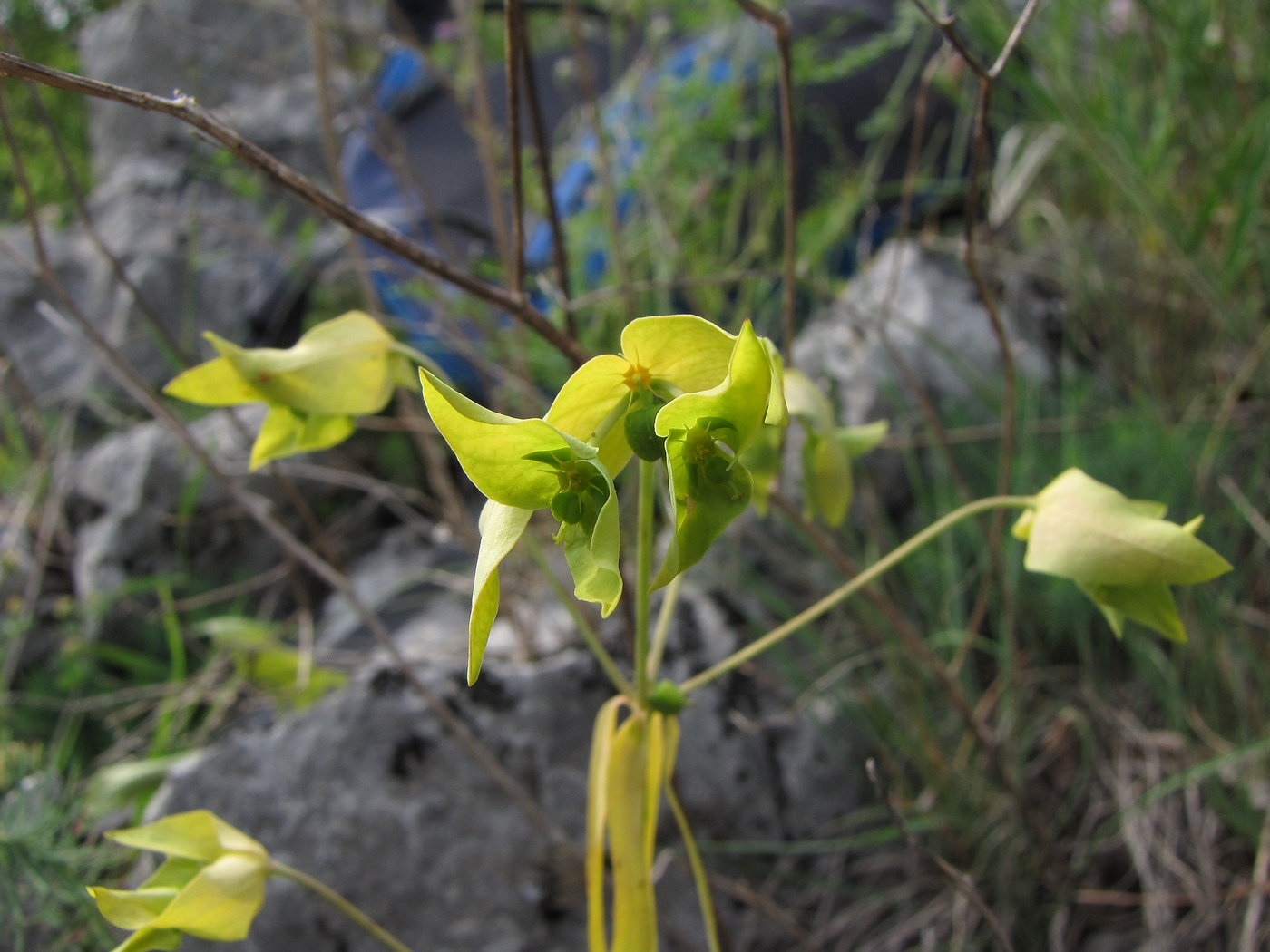

Scientific classification
- Kingdom: Plantae
- Clade: Tracheophytes
- Clade: Angiosperms
- Clade: Eudicots
- Clade: Rosids
- Order: Malpighiales
- Family: Euphorbiaceae
- Genus: Euphorbia
- Species: E. taurinensis

Binomial name
- Euphorbia taurinensis All.

= Euphorbia taurinensis =

Species of plant

Euphorbia taurinensis, the Torino spurge, is a species of flowering plant in the family Euphorbiaceae.

== Description ==
Small hairless annual (to 20(30) cm) with 2-horned flower glands, the horns notably long relative to the gland (occ. not), fruits 2.5-3.5 mm with 3 rounded lobes, the lobe humps grainy, leaves untoothed, stem leaves well-spaced and narrow (leaf ends pointed or indented, often broadening), raylet leaves (near the flowers) broad to slim (sometimes quite narrow but with some breadth); seeds 2 mm ovoid irregularly pitted or net-like (reticulate) but not furrowed, pale grey but darker in the pits and seed appendage (caruncle) prominent white c. hemispherical. (See illustrations Iconographia florae italicae and #3 at Flora of the USSR and iNaturalist Photos)

Confusable species would generally display some opposite features : gland horns short(ish) or none, fruits angular-lobed unlobed or ungrainy, stem-leaves rather dense (e.g. E. exigua, E. aleppica), raylet (flower-) leaves very narrow (E. ledebourii, which usually has longer leaves), seeds furrowed or differing in some way.

== Range ==
Europe except the north, Turkey and N. Caucasus (Albania, Baleares, Bulgaria, Corse, Cyprus, Czechia, Slovakia, East Aegean Is., France, Germany, Greece, Hungary, Italy, Kriti, Krym, North Caucasus, Portugal, Romania, Spain, Switzerland, Turkey, Turkey-in-Europe, Ukraine, Yugoslavia) (PoWo map).

== Habitat ==
Europe: Disturbed ground.

Turkey: Woodland (Quercus/Phillyrea or Pinus brutia), macchie, phrygana, stony places, marshy meadows and fallow fields, 0-1500m.
