= Euphorbia uniglans =

Conservation status
- Endangered (IUCN 3.1)

Scientific classification
- Kingdom: Plantae
- Clade: Tracheophytes
- Clade: Angiosperms
- Clade: Eudicots
- Clade: Rosids
- Order: Malpighiales
- Family: Euphorbiaceae
- Genus: Euphorbia
- Species: E. uniglans

Binomial name
- Euphorbia uniglans M.Gilbert

Species of flowering plant

Euphorbia uniglans is a species of plant in the family Euphorbiaceae. It is endemic to Ethiopia.
