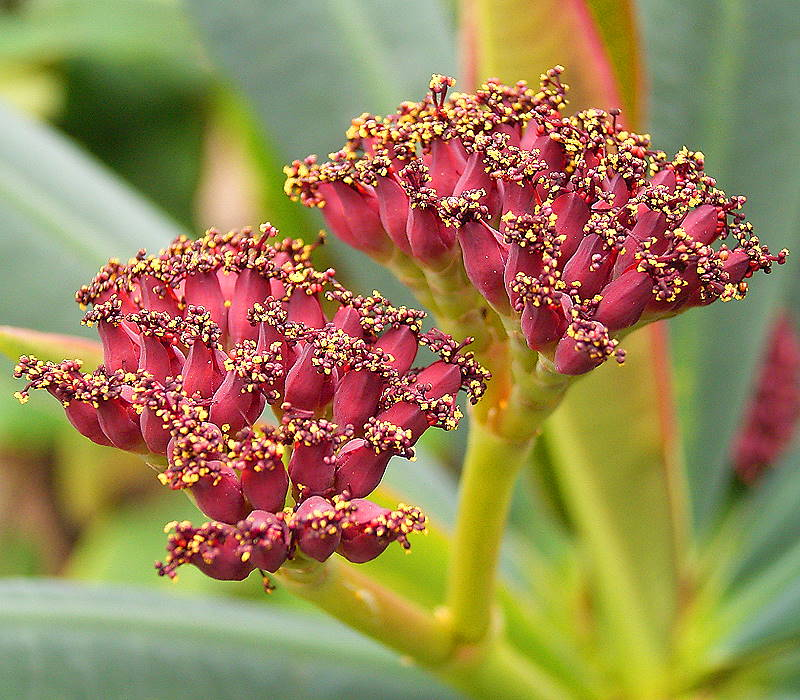

Conservation status
- Critically Endangered (IUCN 3.1)

Scientific classification
- Kingdom: Plantae
- Clade: Tracheophytes
- Clade: Angiosperms
- Clade: Eudicots
- Clade: Rosids
- Order: Malpighiales
- Family: Euphorbiaceae
- Genus: Euphorbia
- Species: E. pachypodioides

Binomial name
- Euphorbia pachypodioides Boiteau

= Euphorbia pachypodioides =

Species of flowering plant

Euphorbia pachypodioides is a species of flowering plant in the family Euphorbiaceae. It is endemic to Madagascar. Its natural habitat is rocky areas. It is threatened by habitat loss. It also has the binomial synonym Euphorbia antankara (Leandri, 1946).

This small plant is available from several sources for enthusiasts. It is attractive, but slow growing.
