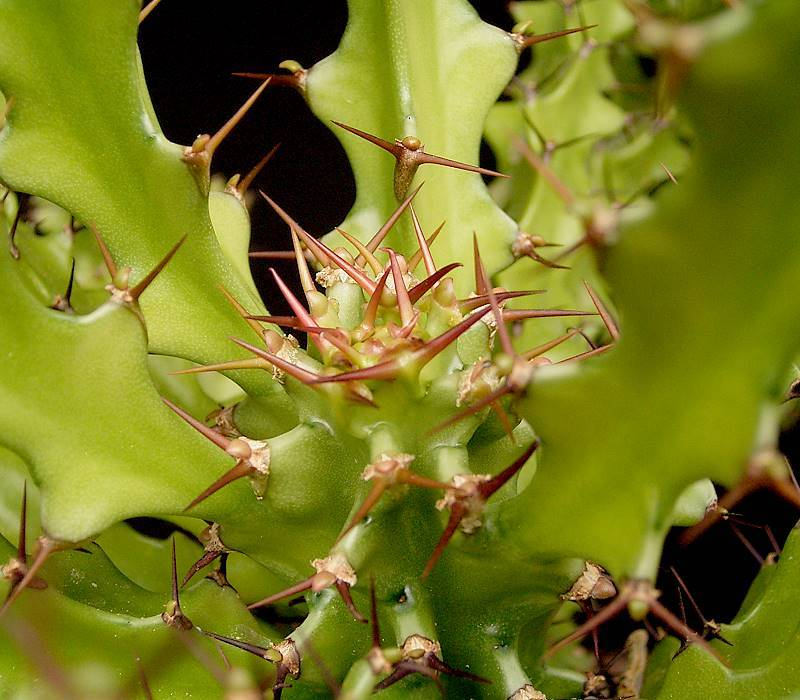

Conservation status
- Endangered (IUCN 3.1)

Scientific classification
- Kingdom: Plantae
- Clade: Tracheophytes
- Clade: Angiosperms
- Clade: Eudicots
- Clade: Rosids
- Order: Malpighiales
- Family: Euphorbiaceae
- Genus: Euphorbia
- Species: E. wakefieldii

Binomial name
- Euphorbia wakefieldii N.E.Br.

= Euphorbia wakefieldii =

Species of flowering plant

Euphorbia wakefieldii is a species of plant in the family Euphorbiaceae. It is found in Kenya and possibly Tanzania. It is a succulent shrub or tree which grows on coral cliffs and limestone outcrops.
