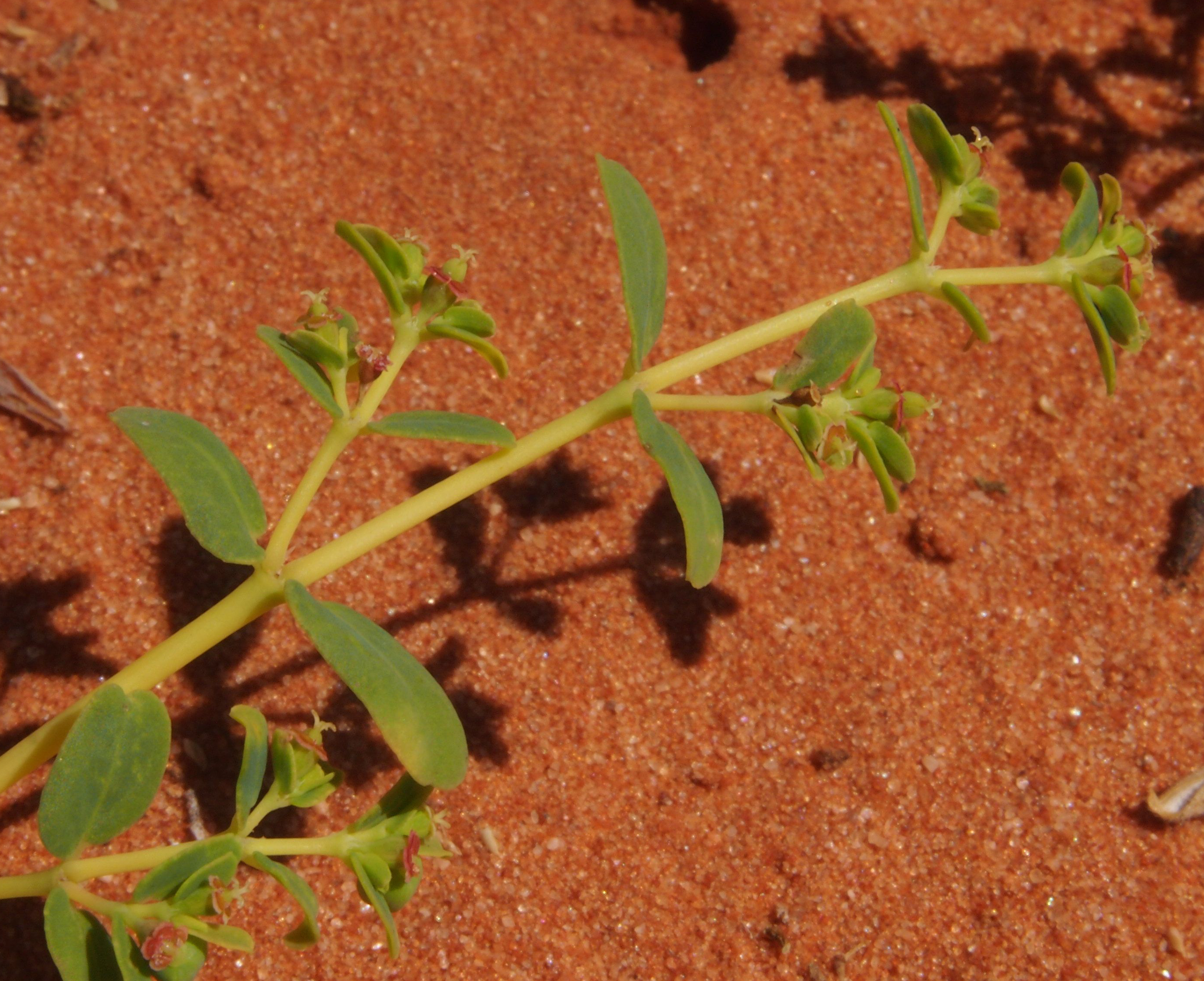

Scientific classification
- Kingdom: Plantae
- Clade: Embryophytes
- Clade: Tracheophytes
- Clade: Spermatophytes
- Clade: Angiosperms
- Clade: Eudicots
- Clade: Rosids
- Order: Malpighiales
- Family: Euphorbiaceae
- Genus: Euphorbia
- Species: E. wheeleri

Binomial name
- Euphorbia wheeleri Baill.

Synonyms
- Chamaesyce wheeleri (Boiss.) D.C.Hassall

= Euphorbia wheeleri =

Species of flowering plant

Euphorbia wheeleri, or Wheeler’s spurge, is an annual herb. Widespread in arid and semi-arid areas of central Australia, growing from 15 to 30 cm high.
