= Euphorbia rosea =

Scientific classification
- Kingdom: Plantae
- Clade: Tracheophytes
- Clade: Angiosperms
- Clade: Eudicots
- Clade: Rosids
- Order: Malpighiales
- Family: Euphorbiaceae
- Genus: Euphorbia
- Species: E. rosea

Binomial name
- Euphorbia rosea Retz.

Synonyms
- Anisophyllum roseum (Retz.) Haw.; Chamaesyce auricularia (Boiss.) V.S.Raju & P.N.Rao; Chamaesyce glaucescens (Willd.) V.S.Raju; Chamaesyce rosea (Retz.) G.L.Webster; Euphorbia auricularia Boiss.; Euphorbia glaucescens Willd.; Euphorbia saturejoides Lam.; Tithymalus rosea (Retz.) Raf.

Species of flowering plant

Euphorbia rosea is a species of plant in the family Euphorbiaceae. It is native to Afghanistan, India, Iran, the Laccadive Islands, Nepal, Pakistan, Sri Lanka, and Vietnam.
