= Euphorbia verruculosa =

Conservation status
- Least Concern (IUCN 3.1)

Scientific classification
- Kingdom: Plantae
- Clade: Tracheophytes
- Clade: Angiosperms
- Clade: Eudicots
- Clade: Rosids
- Order: Malpighiales
- Family: Euphorbiaceae
- Genus: Euphorbia
- Species: E. verruculosa

Binomial name
- Euphorbia verruculosa N.E.Br.

Species of flowering plant

Euphorbia verruculosa is a species of plant in the family Euphorbiaceae. It is endemic to Namibia. Its natural habitats are rocky areas and cold desert.
