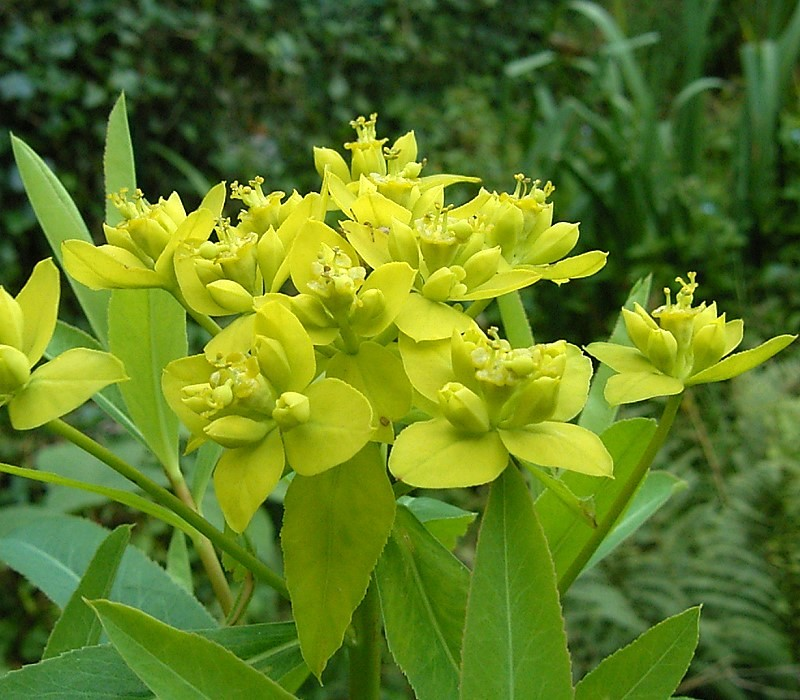
- In bloom
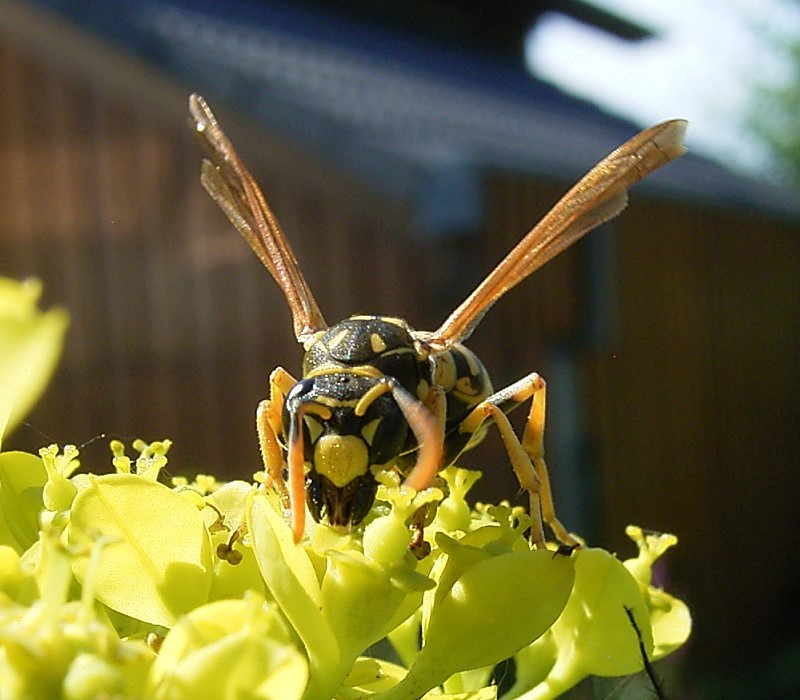
- Being visited by Polistes dominula

Scientific classification
- Kingdom: Plantae
- Clade: Tracheophytes
- Clade: Angiosperms
- Clade: Eudicots
- Clade: Rosids
- Order: Malpighiales
- Family: Euphorbiaceae
- Genus: Euphorbia
- Species: E. sarawschanica

Binomial name
- Euphorbia sarawschanica Regel

Synonyms
- Tithymalus zeravschanicus (Regel) Prokh.

= Euphorbia sarawschanica =

Species of plant

Euphorbia sarawschanica, the Zeravshan spurge, is a species of flowering plant in the family Euphorbiaceae, native to Central Asia. It is a clumping, deciduous herb with narrow, blue-green leaves and greenish-yellow flowers. The Royal Horticultural Society considers it to be a good plant to attract pollinators.
