= Euphorbia thulinii =

Conservation status
- Critically Endangered (IUCN 3.1)

Scientific classification
- Kingdom: Plantae
- Clade: Tracheophytes
- Clade: Angiosperms
- Clade: Eudicots
- Clade: Rosids
- Order: Malpighiales
- Family: Euphorbiaceae
- Genus: Euphorbia
- Species: E. thulinii

Binomial name
- Euphorbia thulinii S.Carter

Species of flowering plant

Euphorbia thulinii is a species of plant in the family Euphorbiaceae. It is endemic to Somalia, and is threatened by habitat loss.
