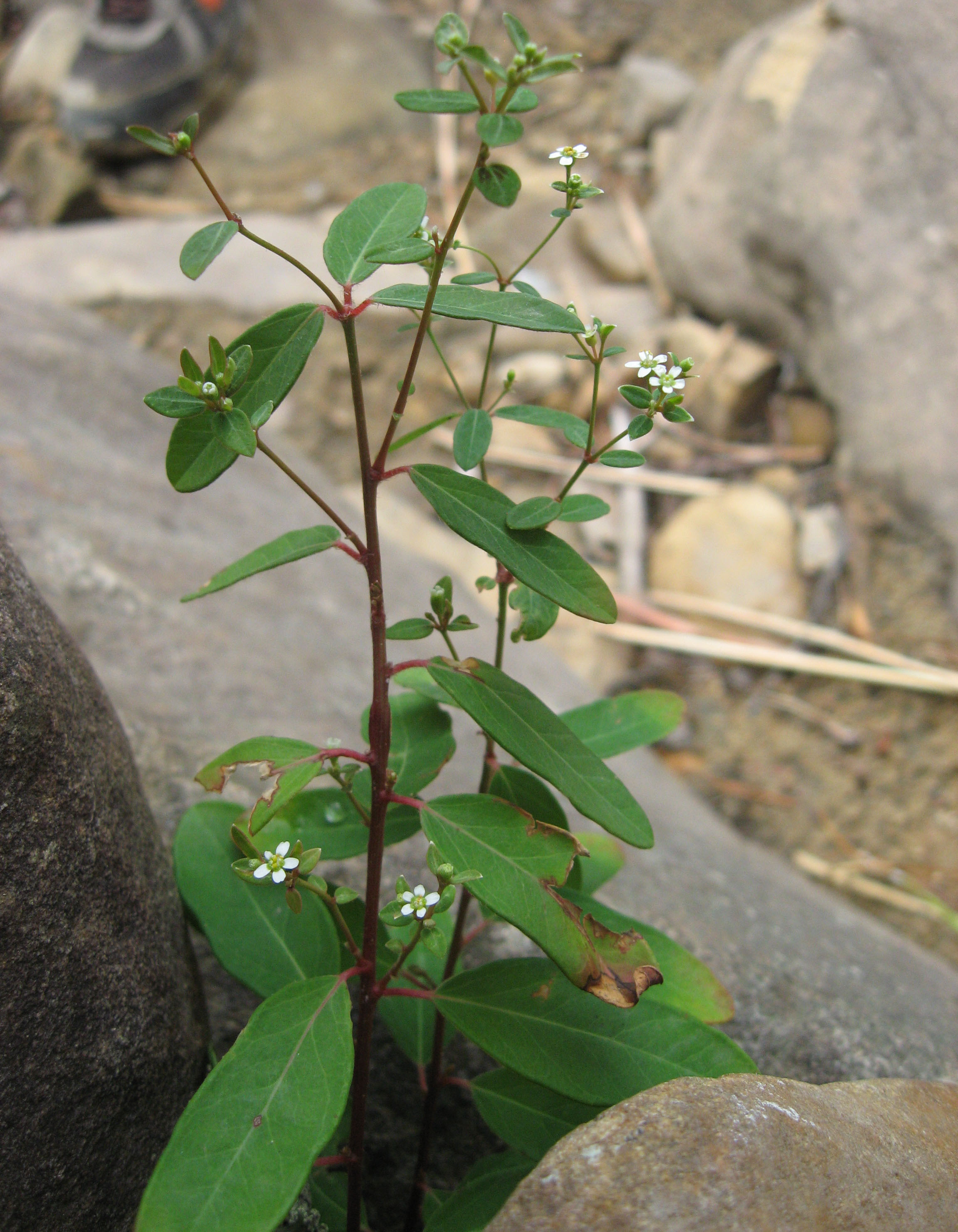

Scientific classification
- Kingdom: Plantae
- Clade: Tracheophytes
- Clade: Angiosperms
- Clade: Eudicots
- Clade: Rosids
- Order: Malpighiales
- Family: Euphorbiaceae
- Genus: Euphorbia
- Species: E. pubentissima

Binomial name
- Euphorbia pubentissima Michx.

= Euphorbia pubentissima =

Species of flowering plant

Euphorbia pubentissima, commonly called the southeastern flowering spurge or false flowering spurge, is a species of plant in the spurge family. It is native to the Southeastern United States where it is found in areas of sandy, open woodlands. It produces small flowers surrounded by white involucral gland appendages from spring to fall.

Euphorbia pubentissima is a variable species with a complex taxonomic history. It has been included in Euphorbia corollata by past researchers, which has obscured the true limits of its geographic distribution.
