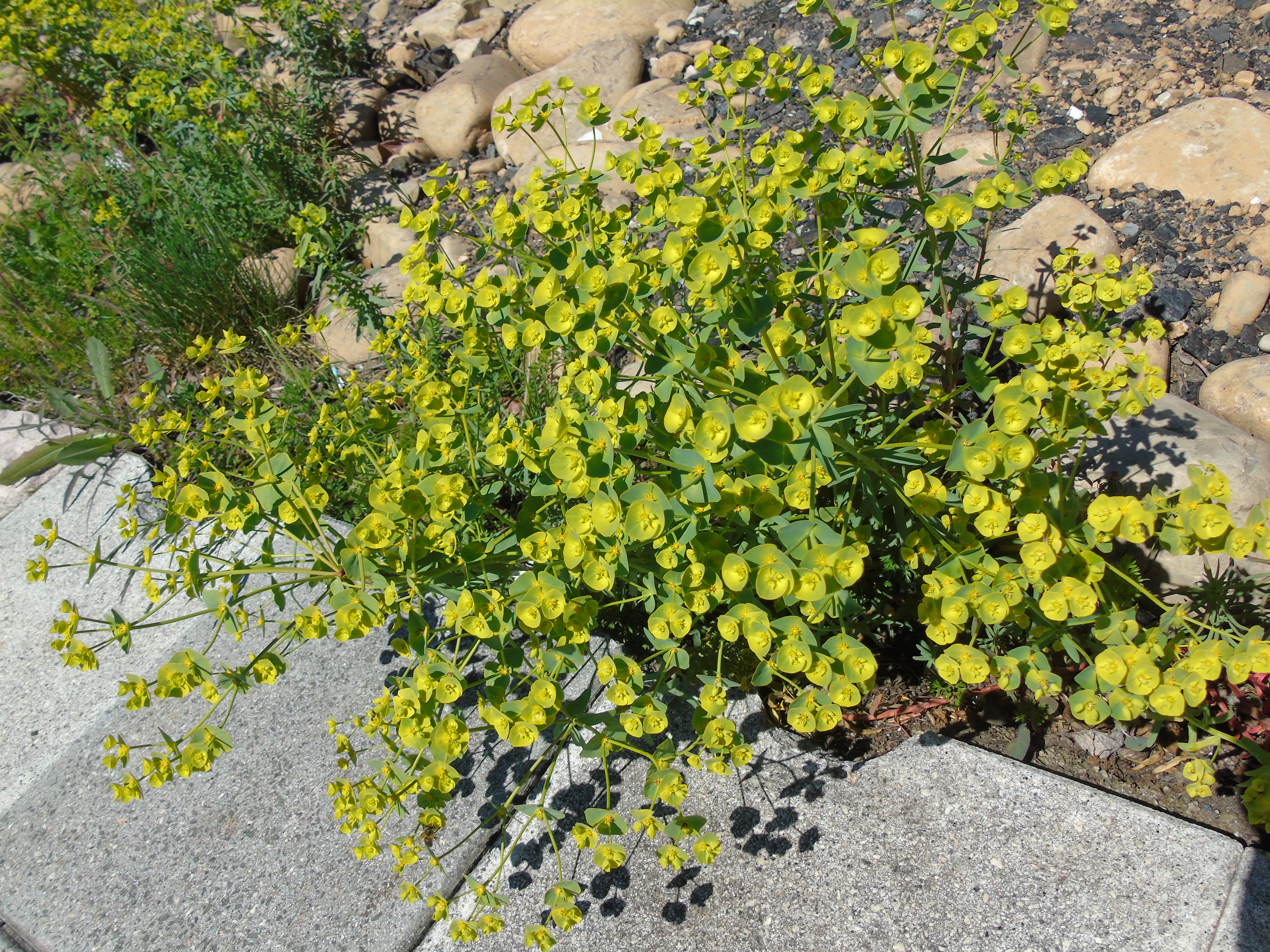

Scientific classification
- Kingdom: Plantae
- Clade: Tracheophytes
- Clade: Angiosperms
- Clade: Eudicots
- Clade: Rosids
- Order: Malpighiales
- Family: Euphorbiaceae
- Genus: Euphorbia
- Species: E. segetalis

Binomial name
- Euphorbia segetalis L.

Synonyms
- Euphorbia pinea

= Euphorbia segetalis =

Species of plant

Euphorbia segetalis, the grainfield spurge, is a species of annual herb in the family Euphorbiaceae. They have a self-supporting growth form and simple, broad leaves. Flowers are visited by Plagiolepis pygmaea, Polistes, and nomad bees. Individuals can grow to 16 cm tall.

== Sources ==
This article incorporates text from a free content work. Licensed under CC0 (license statement/permission). Text taken from Euphorbia segetalis. Encyclopedia of Life.
