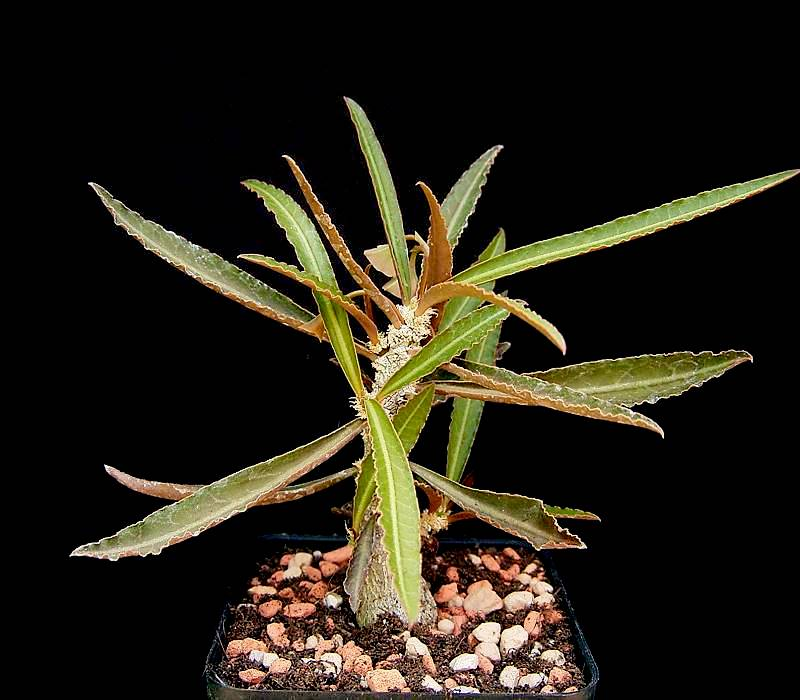

Conservation status
- Vulnerable (IUCN 3.1)

Scientific classification
- Kingdom: Plantae
- Clade: Tracheophytes
- Clade: Angiosperms
- Clade: Eudicots
- Clade: Rosids
- Order: Malpighiales
- Family: Euphorbiaceae
- Genus: Euphorbia
- Species: E. waringiae

Binomial name
- Euphorbia waringiae Rauh

= Euphorbia waringiae =

Species of flowering plant

Euphorbia waringiae is a species of plant in the family Euphorbiaceae. It is endemic to Madagascar. Its natural habitats are subtropical or tropical dry forests and subtropical or tropical dry shrubland. It is threatened by habitat loss.
