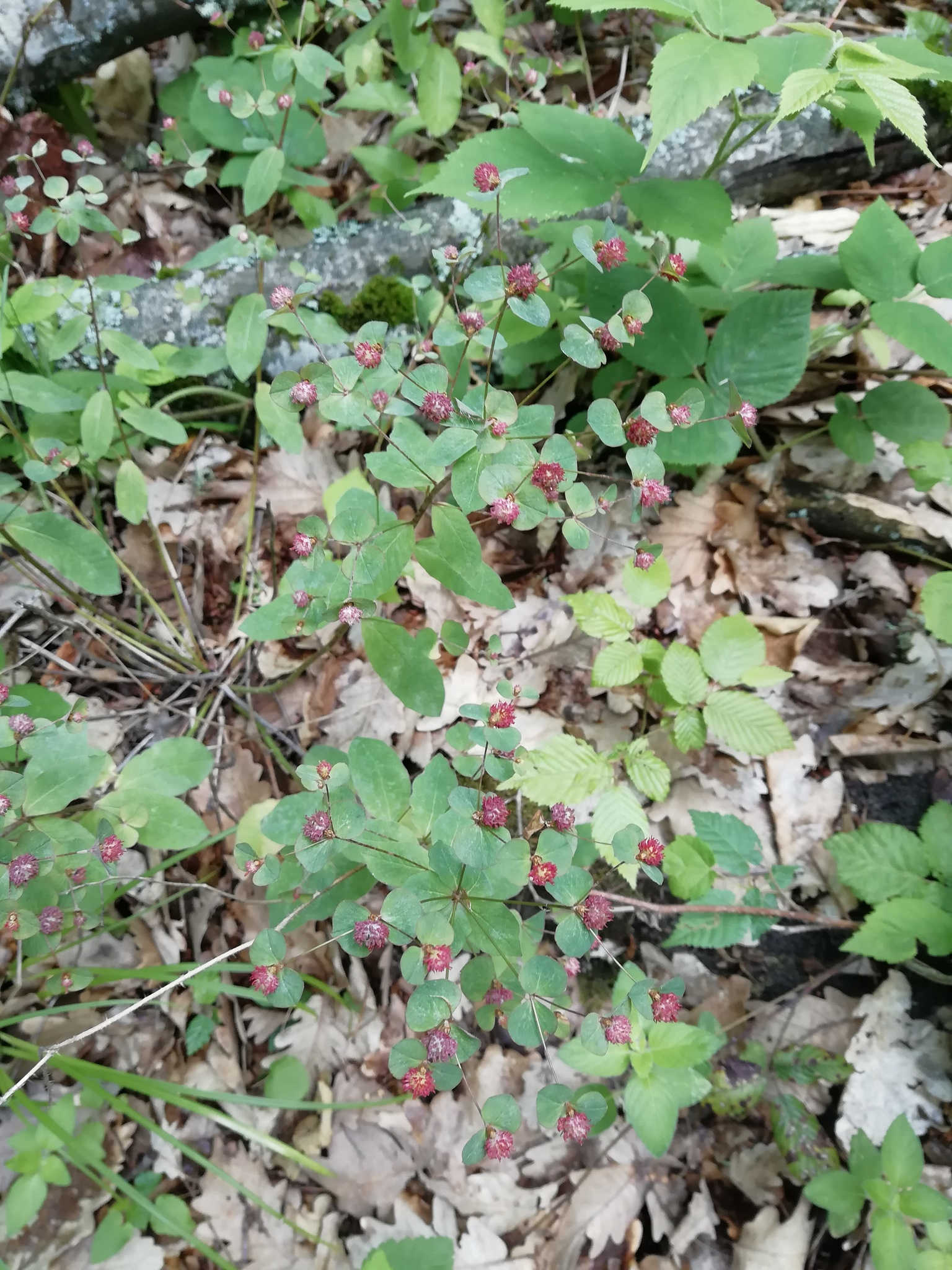

Scientific classification
- Kingdom: Plantae
- Clade: Tracheophytes
- Clade: Angiosperms
- Clade: Eudicots
- Clade: Rosids
- Order: Malpighiales
- Family: Euphorbiaceae
- Genus: Euphorbia
- Species: E. squamosa

Binomial name
- Euphorbia squamosa Willd.

Synonyms
- Euphorbia muricata M.Bieb.

= Euphorbia squamosa =

Species of flowering plant

Euphorbia squamosa is a species of plant in the family Euphorbiaceae. It is endemic to Iran, Russia, Georgia, Armenia, Azerbaijan, and Turkey.
