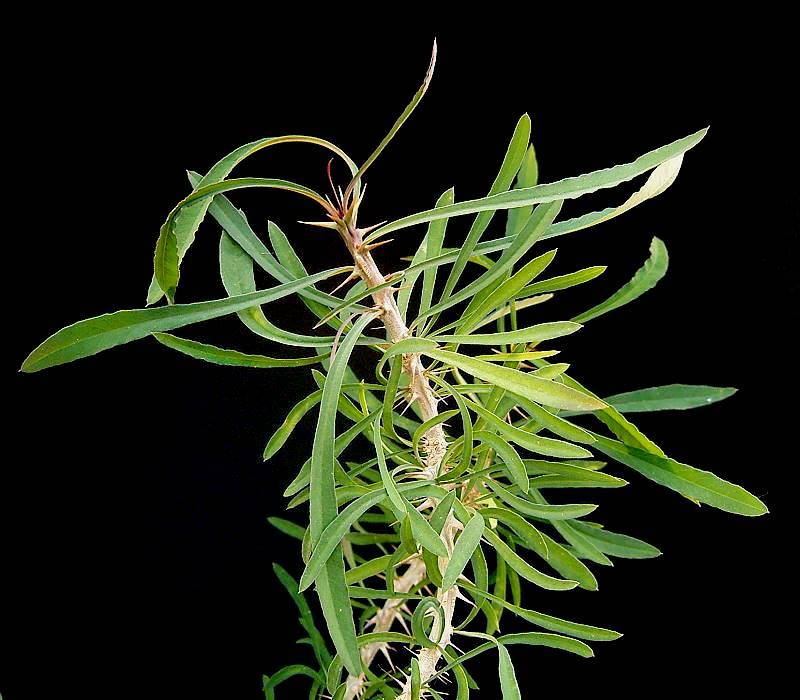

Conservation status
- Vulnerable (IUCN 3.1)

Scientific classification
- Kingdom: Plantae
- Clade: Tracheophytes
- Clade: Angiosperms
- Clade: Eudicots
- Clade: Rosids
- Order: Malpighiales
- Family: Euphorbiaceae
- Genus: Euphorbia
- Species: E. sakarahaensis

Binomial name
- Euphorbia sakarahaensis Rauh

= Euphorbia sakarahaensis =

Species of flowering plant

Euphorbia sakarahaensis is a species of plant in the family Euphorbiaceae. It is endemic to Madagascar. Its natural habitat is subtropical or tropical dry forests. It is threatened by habitat loss. It was described by Werner Rauh in 1992.
