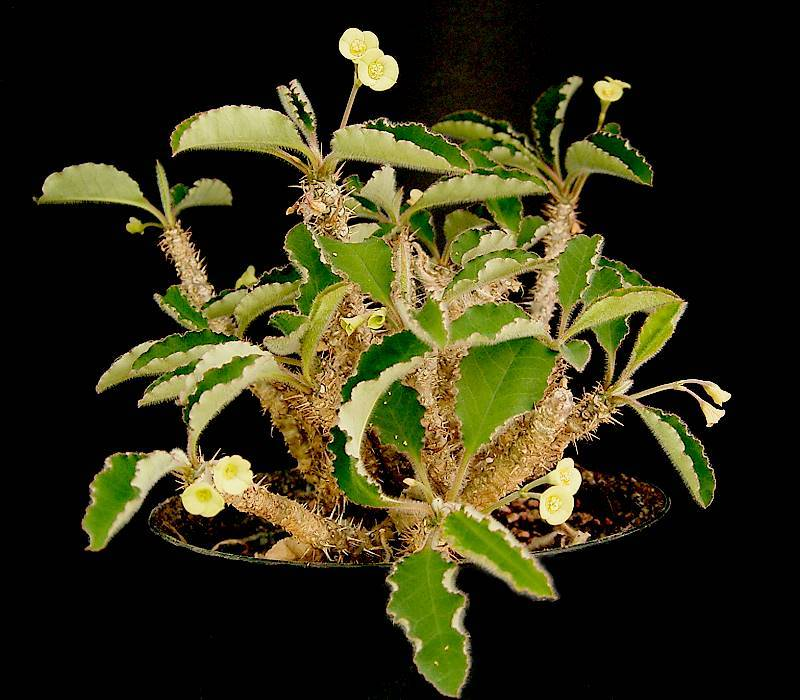

Conservation status
- Critically Endangered (IUCN 3.1)

Scientific classification
- Kingdom: Plantae
- Clade: Tracheophytes
- Clade: Angiosperms
- Clade: Eudicots
- Clade: Rosids
- Order: Malpighiales
- Family: Euphorbiaceae
- Genus: Euphorbia
- Species: E. razafindratsirae

Binomial name
- Euphorbia razafindratsirae Lavranos

= Euphorbia razafindratsirae =

Species of plant

Euphorbia razafindratsirae is a species of plant in the family Euphorbiaceae. It is endemic to Madagascar. Its natural habitats are subtropical or tropical dry forests and subtropical or tropical dry shrubland. It is threatened by habitat loss.
