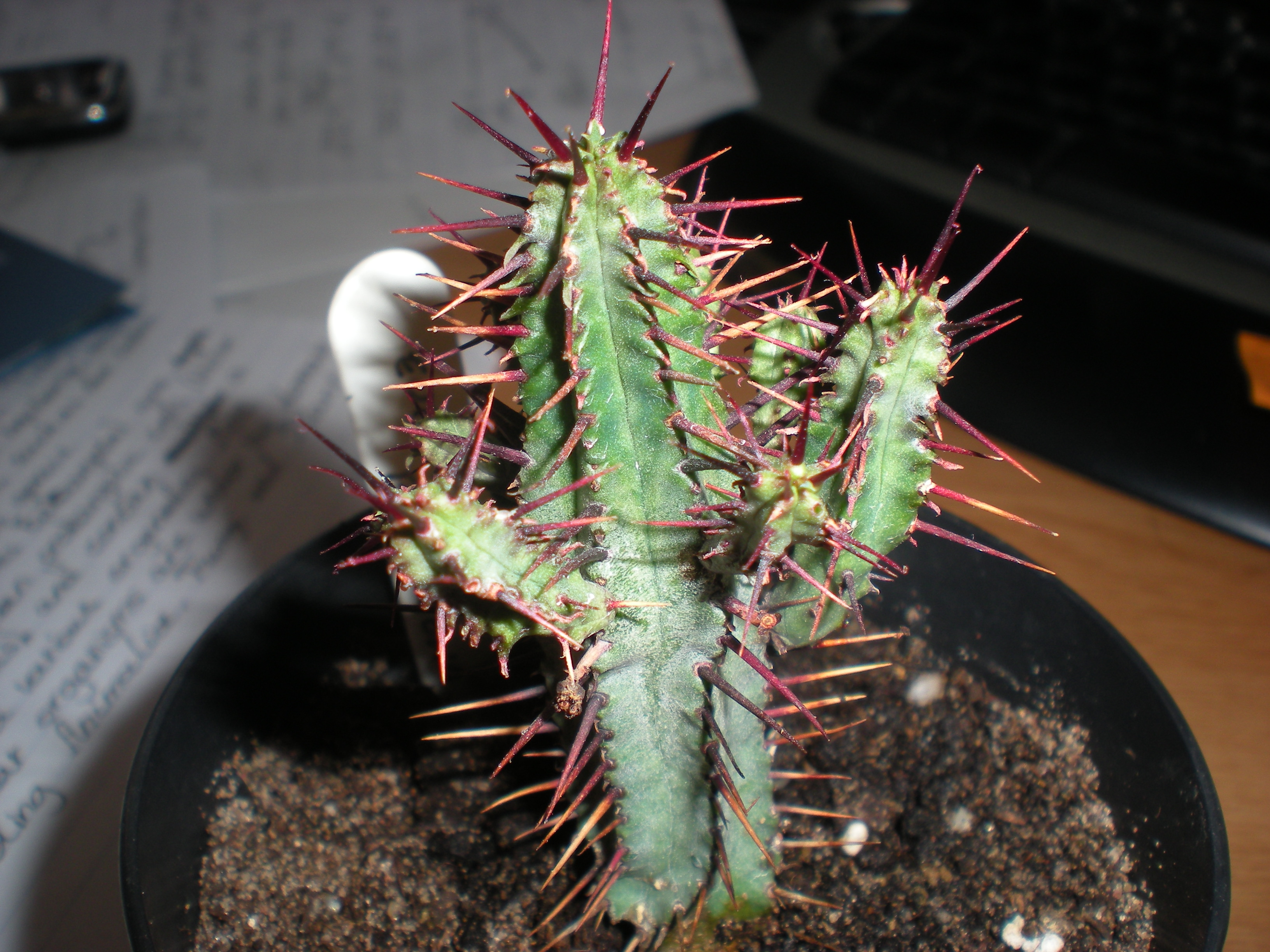

Scientific classification
- Kingdom: Plantae
- Clade: Tracheophytes
- Clade: Angiosperms
- Clade: Eudicots
- Clade: Rosids
- Order: Malpighiales
- Family: Euphorbiaceae
- Genus: Euphorbia
- Species: E. pentagona

Binomial name
- Euphorbia pentagona Haw.

= Euphorbia pentagona =

Species of flowering plant

Euphorbia pentagona is a medium-green Euphorbia; starts off as having a pentagonal prism shape where each vertex is extruded outwards, and each side is a mild concavity, along the height of the euphorb. Spines, red in colour when fresh, exit the body along each extrusion at equal intervals. As the spines age, they tend to lose their colour. The cross-sectional polygonal shape can gain extra vertexes as new branches grow from the sides. Often branches grow from where a spine once was, or should have been.
