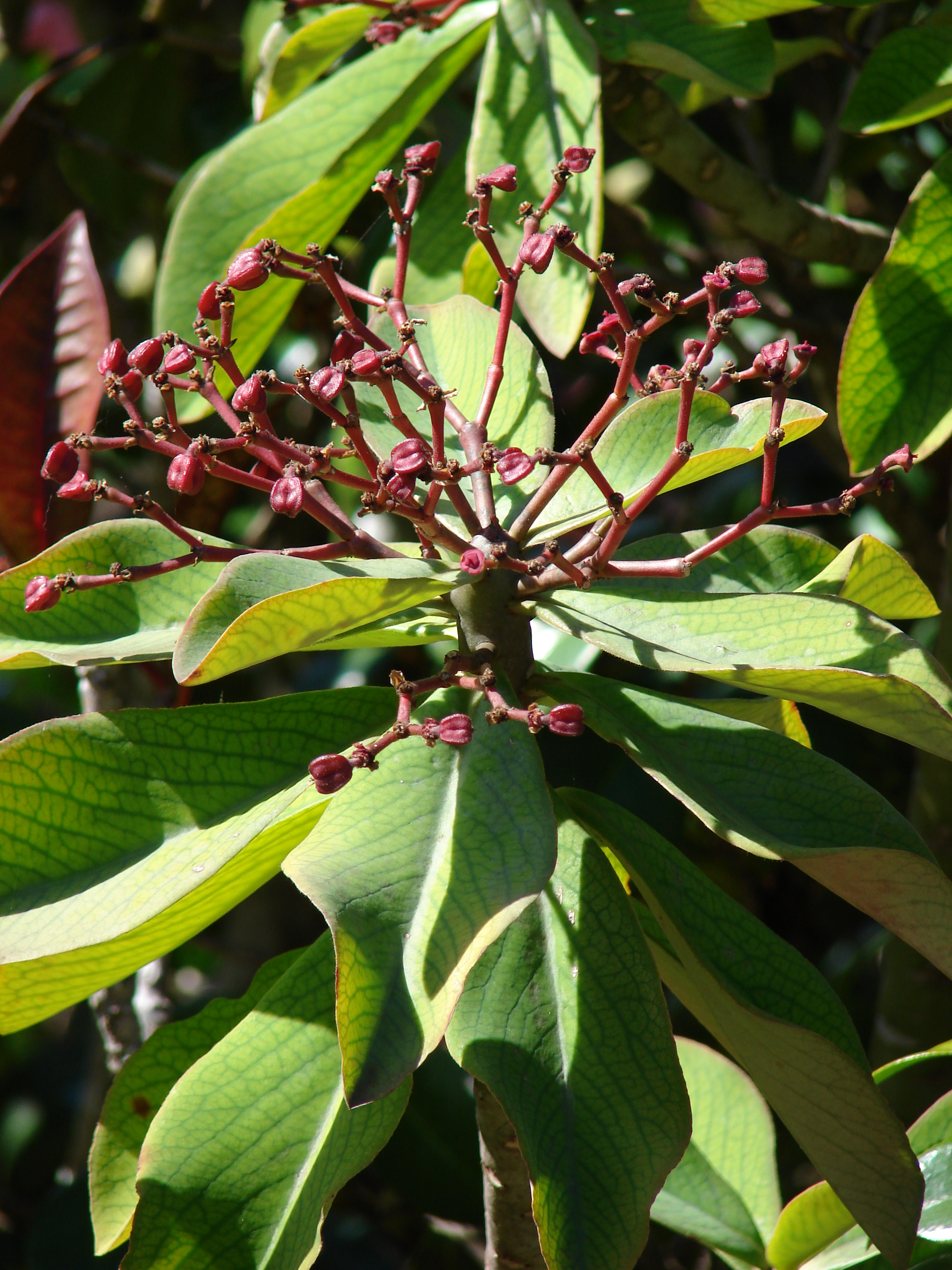
- Maui, Haiku

Scientific classification
- Kingdom: Plantae
- Clade: Embryophytes
- Clade: Tracheophytes
- Clade: Spermatophytes
- Clade: Angiosperms
- Clade: Eudicots
- Clade: Rosids
- Order: Malpighiales
- Family: Euphorbiaceae
- Genus: Euphorbia
- Species: E. umbellata

Binomial name
- Euphorbia umbellata (Pax) Bruyns

Synonyms
- Euphorbia pseudograntii; Synadenium grantii; Synadenium umbellatum

= Euphorbia umbellata =

Plant species in the spurge family

Euphorbia umbellata, the African milkbush, is a species in the spurge family from Africa.

== Description ==
African milkbushes are moderate sized shrubs to medium trees growing 2–10 meters (6.5–33 ft) tall. The young stems have a fleshy texture. The leaves are attached directly to stems by their base and either have smooth edges or very small teeth towards the ends. Wild specimens have green leaves that are sometimes somewhat red colored on the undersides, however garden plants with fully or partly purplish red leaves are in cultivation. They measure 6–15 cm (2.5–6 in) long by 2–6 cm (1–2.5 in) wide.

== Taxonomy ==
In 1894 Ferdinand Albin Pax described a species which he named Synadenium umbellatum. In 2006 research into the DNA of Synadenium indicated that it should be merged with the Euphorbia genus. The new name for the species, Euphorbia umbellata, was published by Peter Vincent Bruyns in 2007. Together with its genus it is classified in the Euphorbiaceae family. Including its previous name it has four botanical synonyms. Prior to its reclassification Synadenium grantii was typically used for the species, including in scientific texts, but this name should not be confused with Euphorbia grantii.

Table of Synonyms
Name	Year	Rank	Notes
Euphorbia pseudograntii Bruyns	2006	species	= het. nom. illeg.
Synadenium grantii Hook.f.	1867	species	= het.
Synadenium umbellatum Pax	1894	species	≡ hom.
Synadenium umbellatum var. puberulum N.E.Br.	1911	variety	= het.
Notes: ≡ homotypic synonym; = heterotypic synonym

Euphorbia umbellata is known by the common names African milk bush, African milk-bush, and African milkbush, due to the poisonous, white latex sap produced from wounds.

== Range ==
Euphorbia umbellata is native to eastern areas in the Democratic Republic of the Congo, Burundi, and Tanzania along both shores of Lake Tanganyika as well as in western Kenya and Uganda. According to Plants of the World Online it is also native in Rwanda and South Sudan, but is doubtfully present in Malawi. It is found at elevations of 950 to 2,100 meters (3,120–6,890 ft) on rocky slopes in open woodlands.

It grows as an introduced plant in Bangladesh and India.

== Uses ==
African milkbush is cultivated in tropical gardens as well as a container plant. Plants are typically grown from cuttings and are regarded as easy to cultivate in gardens. The cultivar 'Rubra' with solid purple-red leaves is valued by gardeners for adding year round color to landscapes.
