= Euphorbia razafinjohanyi =

Conservation status
- Data Deficient (IUCN 3.1)

Scientific classification
- Kingdom: Plantae
- Clade: Tracheophytes
- Clade: Angiosperms
- Clade: Eudicots
- Clade: Rosids
- Order: Malpighiales
- Family: Euphorbiaceae
- Genus: Euphorbia
- Species: E. razafinjohanyi

Binomial name
- Euphorbia razafinjohanyi Ursch & Leandri

Species of flowering plant

Euphorbia razafinjohanyi is a species of flowering plant in the family Euphorbiaceae. It is endemic to Madagascar.
