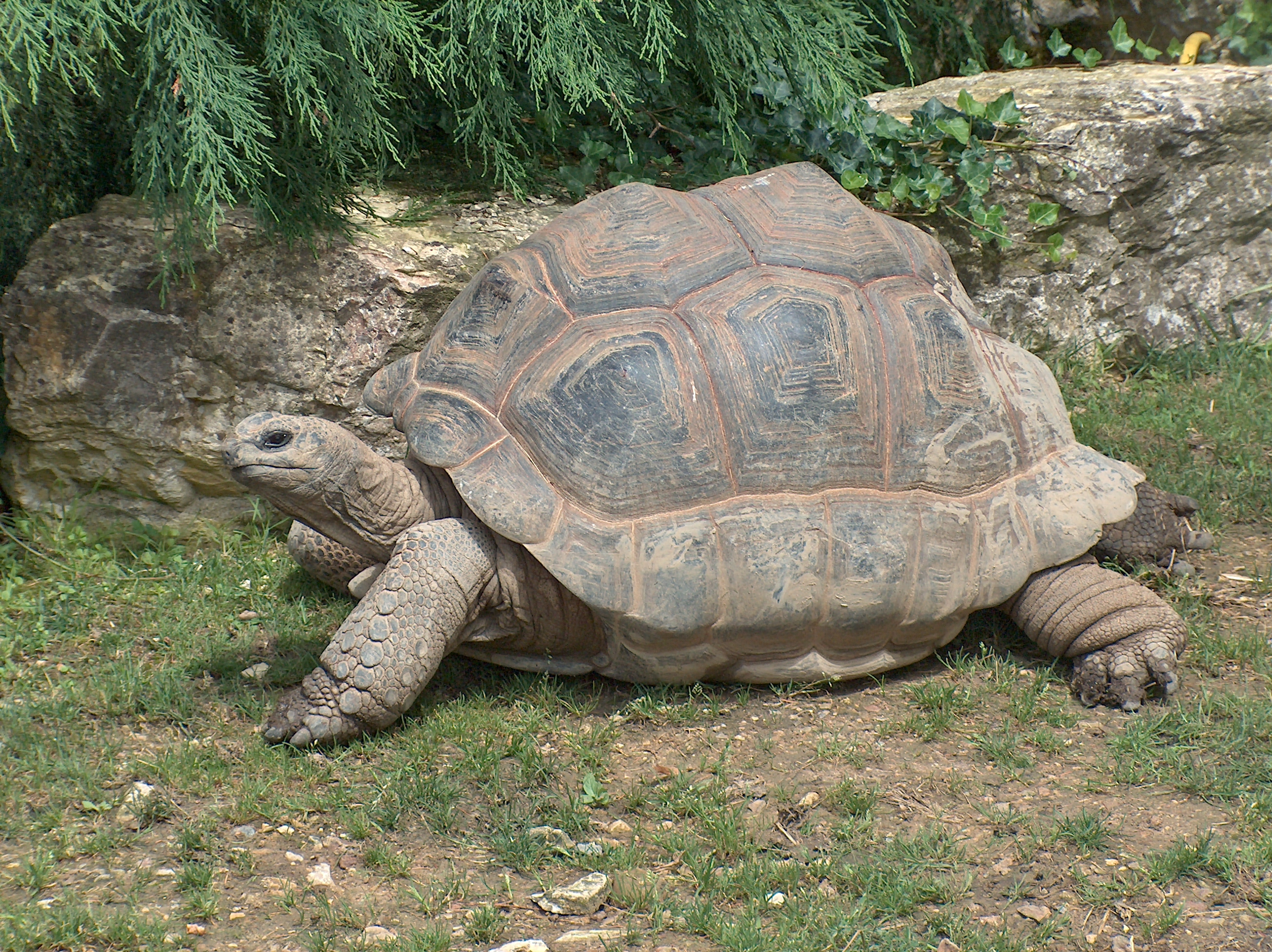
- Beauval Zoo, France

Conservation status
- Vulnerable (IUCN 2.3)
- CITES Appendix II

Scientific classification
- Kingdom: Animalia
- Phylum: Chordata
- Class: Reptilia
- Order: Testudines
- Suborder: Cryptodira
- Family: Testudinidae
- Genus: Aldabrachelys
- Species: A. gigantea

Binomial name
- Aldabrachelys gigantea (Schweigger, 1812)

Synonyms
- List: Testudo gigantea Schweigger, 1812: 327; Testudo dussumieri Schlegel in Gray, 1830: 3 (nomen nudum); Testudo dussumieri — Gray, 1831d: 9 (nomen rejectum, ICZN 2013); Testudo elephantina A.M.C. Duméril & Bibron, 1835: 110; Testudo ponderosa Günther, 1877: 35; Testudo sumeirei Sauzier, 1892: 396; Testudo gouffei Rothschild, 1906: 753

= Aldabra giant tortoise =

Species of tortoise

(video) A pair of Aldabra giant tortoises at Tobu Zoo in Saitama, Japan

The Aldabra giant tortoise (Aldabrachelys gigantea), Aldabra tortoise, or simply giant tortoise, is a species of tortoise in the family Testudinidae and genus Aldabrachelys. The species is endemic to the Seychelles, with the nominate subspecies, A. g. gigantea native to Aldabra atoll. It is one of the largest tortoises in the world. Historically, giant tortoises were found on many of the western Indian Ocean islands, as well as Madagascar, and the fossil record indicates giant tortoises once occurred on every continent and many islands with the exception of Antarctica.

Many of the Indian Ocean species were thought to be driven to extinction by over-exploitation by European sailors, and they were all seemingly extinct by 1840 with the exception of the Aldabran giant tortoise on the island atoll of Aldabra. Although some remnant individuals of A. g. hololissa and A. g. arnoldi may remain in captivity, in recent times, these have all been reduced as subspecies of A. gigantea.

== Description ==
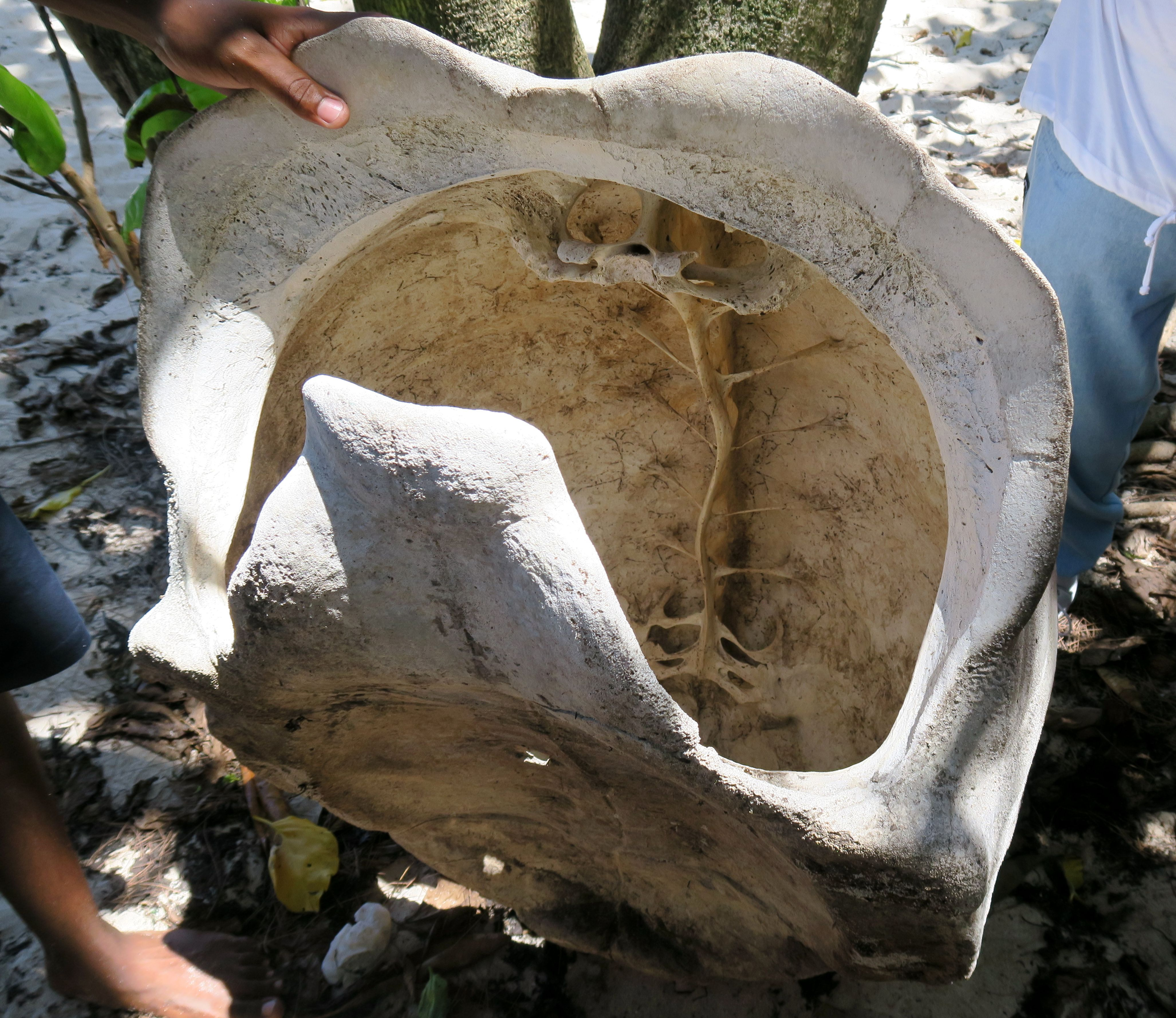
A skeleton of Aldabra giant tortoise found on Cousin Island (Seychelles)

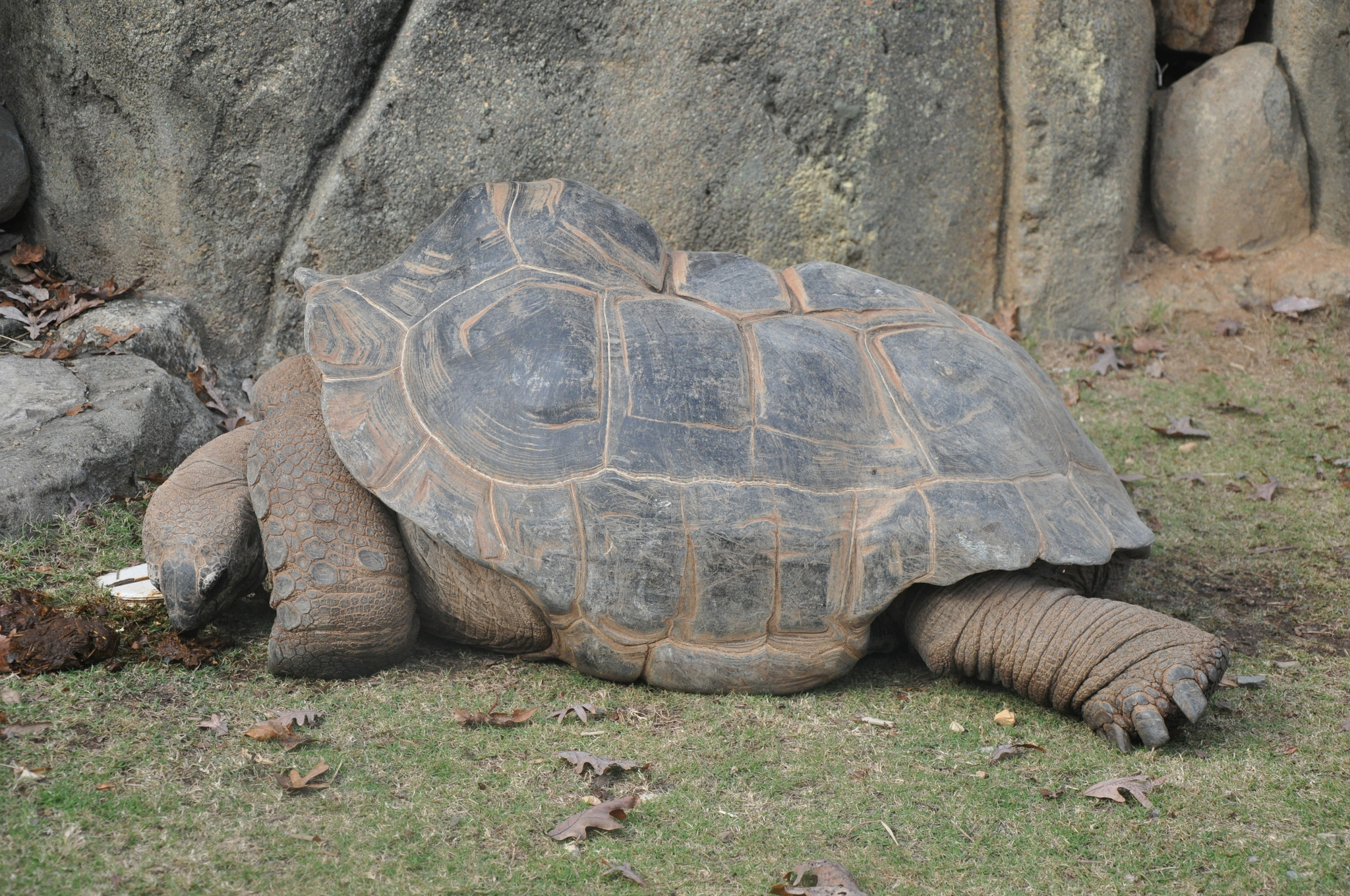
At Greensboro Science Center

The carapace of A. gigantea is a brown or tan in color with a high, domed shape. The species has stocky, heavily scaled legs to support its heavy body. The neck of the Aldabra giant tortoise is very long, even for its great size, which helps the animal to exploit tree branches up to a meter from the ground as a food source. Similar in size to the famous Galápagos giant tortoise, its carapace averages 122 cm (48 in) in length. Males have an average weight of 250 kg (550 lb).

Females are generally smaller than males, with average specimens measuring 91 cm (36 in) in carapace length and weighing 159 kg (351 lb). Medium-sized specimens in captivity were reported as 70 to 110 kg (150 to 240 lb) in body mass. Another study found body masses of up to 132 kg (291 lb) most commonplace.

== Nomenclature and systematics ==
This species is widely referred to as Aldabrachelys gigantea, but in recent times, attempts were made to use the name Dipsochelys as Dipsochelys dussumieri. After a debate that lasted two years with many submissions, the ICZN eventually decided to conserve the name Testudo gigantea over this recently used name (ICZN 2013). This also affected the genus name for the species, establishing Aldabrachelys gigantea as nomen protectum.

Four subspecies are currently recognized. A trinomial authority in parentheses indicates that the subspecies was originally described in a genus other than Aldabrachelys:

- A. g. gigantea (Schweigger, 1812:327), Aldabra giant tortoise from the Seychelles island of Aldabra
- A. g. arnoldi (Bour, 1982:118), Arnold's giant tortoise from the Seychelles island of Mahé
- A. g. daudinii † (A.M.C. Duméril & Bibron, 1835:123), Daudin's giant tortoise, from the Seychelles island of Mahé (extinct 1850)
- A. g. hololissa (Günther, 1877:39), Seychelles giant tortoise, from the Seychelles islands of Cerf, Cousine, Frégate, Mahé, Praslin, Round, and Silhouette

The subspecific name, daudinii, is in honor of French zoologist François Marie Daudin.

Genetic evidence suggests that A. gigantea is most closely related to the extinct giant tortoise Aldabrachelys abrupta from Madagascar, from which it is estimated to have diverged from approximately 4.5 million years ago.

== Range and distribution ==
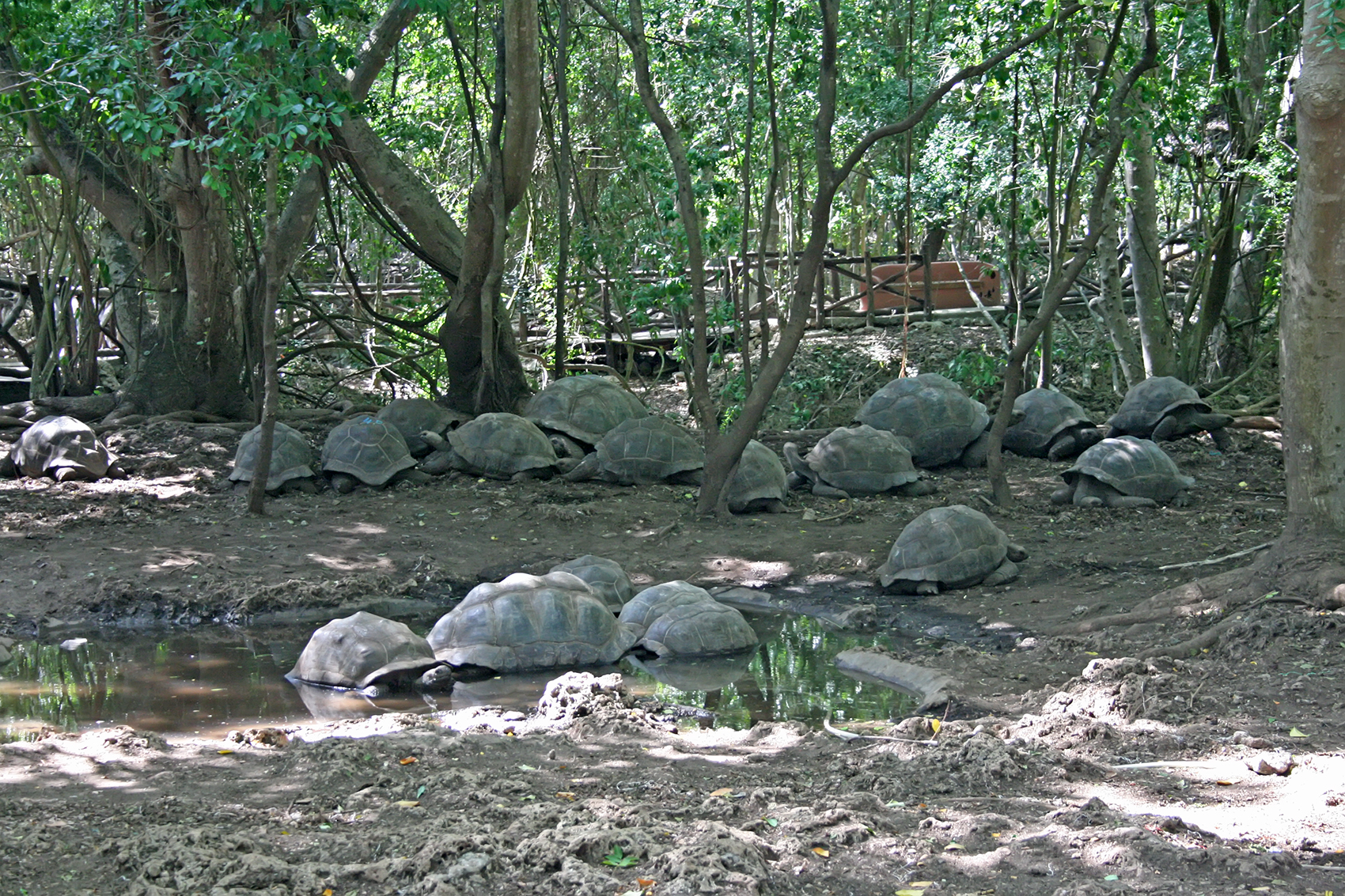
An isolated population resides on Changuu island in Zanzibar

The main population of the Aldabra giant tortoise resides on the islands of the Aldabra Atoll in the Seychelles. The atoll has been protected from human influence and is home to some 180,000 giant tortoises, the world's largest population of the animal. Smaller populations of A. gigantea in the Seychelles exist on Frégate Island and in the Sainte Anne Marine National Park (e.g. Moyenne Island), where they are a popular tourist attraction. Conservationists have also reintroduced 50 small individuals to Aride Island, joining 10 larger tortoises previously rehomed there.

Another isolated population of the species resides on the island of Changuu, near Zanzibar. Other captive populations exist in conservation parks in the Mascarene Islands of Mauritius and Rodrigues (Aldabrachelys is not native to the Mascarenes, which were inhabited by their own later-extinct giant tortoises belonging to the unrelated genus Cylindraspis). The tortoises exploit many different kinds of habitat, including grasslands, low scrub, mangrove swamps, and coastal dunes.

== Ecology ==
=== Habitat ===
A peculiar habitat has coevolved due to the grazing pressures of the tortoises: "tortoise turf", a comingling of 20+ species of grasses and herbs. Many of these distinct plants are naturally dwarfed and grow their seeds not from the tops of the plants, but closer to the ground to avoid the tortoises' close-cropping jaws.

As the largest animal in its environment, the Aldabra tortoise performs a role similar to that of the elephant. Their vigorous search for food fells trees and creates pathways used by other animals.

=== Feeding ecology ===
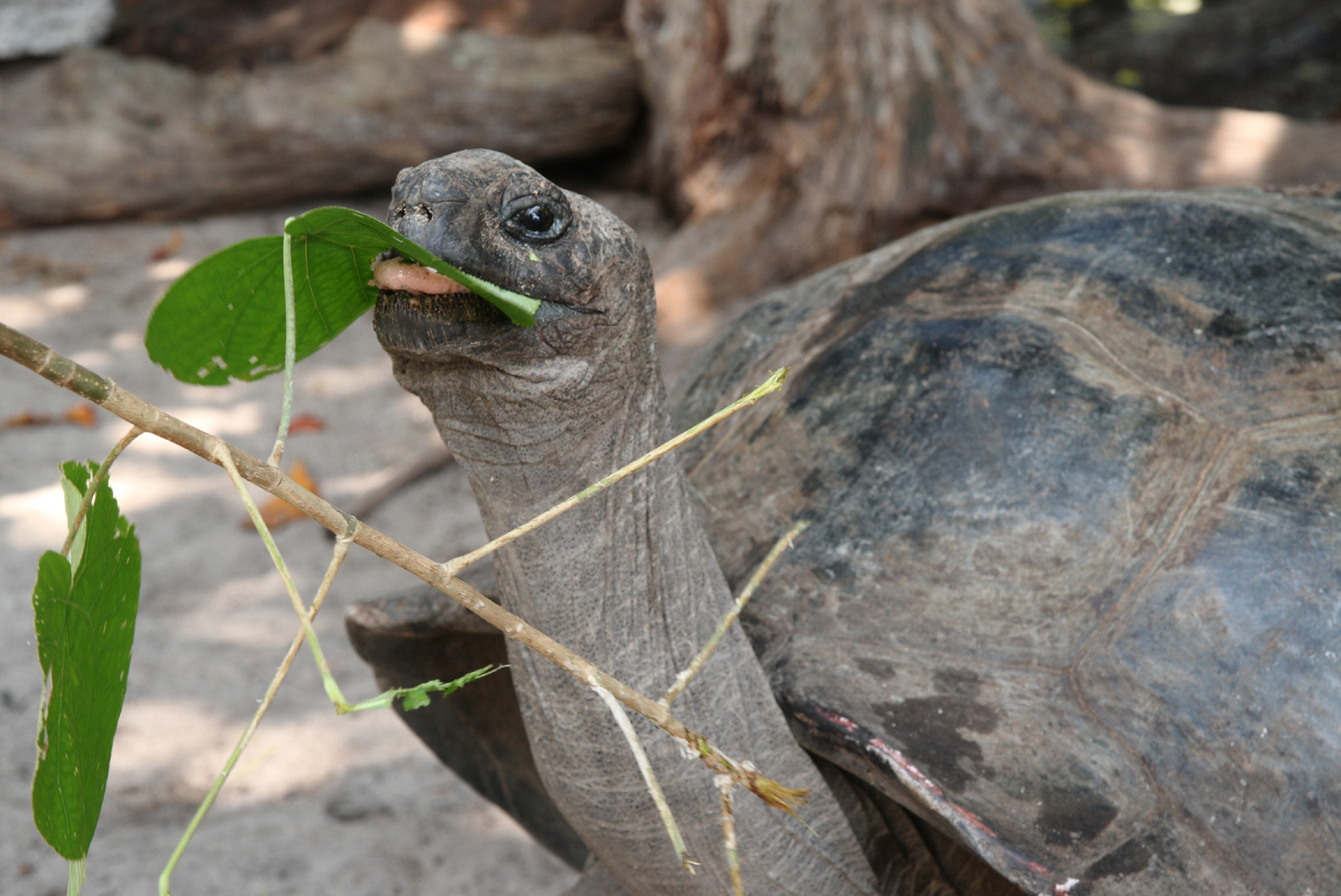
A giant tortoise browsing leaves

Primarily herbivores, Aldabra giant tortoises eat grasses, leaves, woody plant stems, and fruit. They occasionally indulge in small invertebrates and carrion, even eating the bodies of other dead tortoises. In captivity, Aldabra giant tortoises are known to consume fruits, such as apples and bananas, as well as compressed vegetable pellets. In 2020, a female Aldabra giant tortoise on Fregate Island was observed hunting and eating a juvenile lesser noddy, indicating that the species was in the process of learning to catch birds.

Little fresh water is available for drinking in the tortoises' natural habitat, so they obtain most of their moisture from their food.

The Aldabra giant tortoise has two main varieties of shells, related to their habitat. Specimens living in habitats with food available primarily on the ground have more dome-shaped shells with the front extending downward over the neck. Those living in an environment with food available higher above the ground have more flattened top shells with the front raised to allow the neck to extend upward freely.

=== Tortoise turf ===
As the Aldabra giant tortoise is primarily herbivorous it spends much of its time browsing for food in its surrounding well-vegetated environment. The Aldabra giant tortoise is known to be found in places that are commonly known as "tortoise turf". Tortoise turf is composed of:

- Bacopa monnieri
- Boerhavia elegans
- Bulbostylis basalis
- Cassia aldabrensis
- Cyperus dubius
- Cyperus ligularis
- Cyperus obtusiflorus
- Dactyloctenium pilosum
- Eragrostis decumbens
- Euphorbia prostrata
- Euphorbia stoddartii
- Evolvulus alsinoides
- Fimbristylis cymosa
- Fimbristylis ferruginea
- Hypoestes aldabrensis
- Lagrezia madagascariensis
- Lepturus repens
- Mollugo spergula
- Panicum aldabrense
- Phyllanthus maderaspatensis
- Pleurostelma cernuum
- Plumbaga aphylla
- Pycreus pumilus
- Ruellia monanthos
- Sclerodactylon macrostachyum
- Sida parvifolia
- Solanum nigrum
- Sporobolus testudinum
- Sporobolus virginicus
- Tephrosia pumila

== Behavior ==
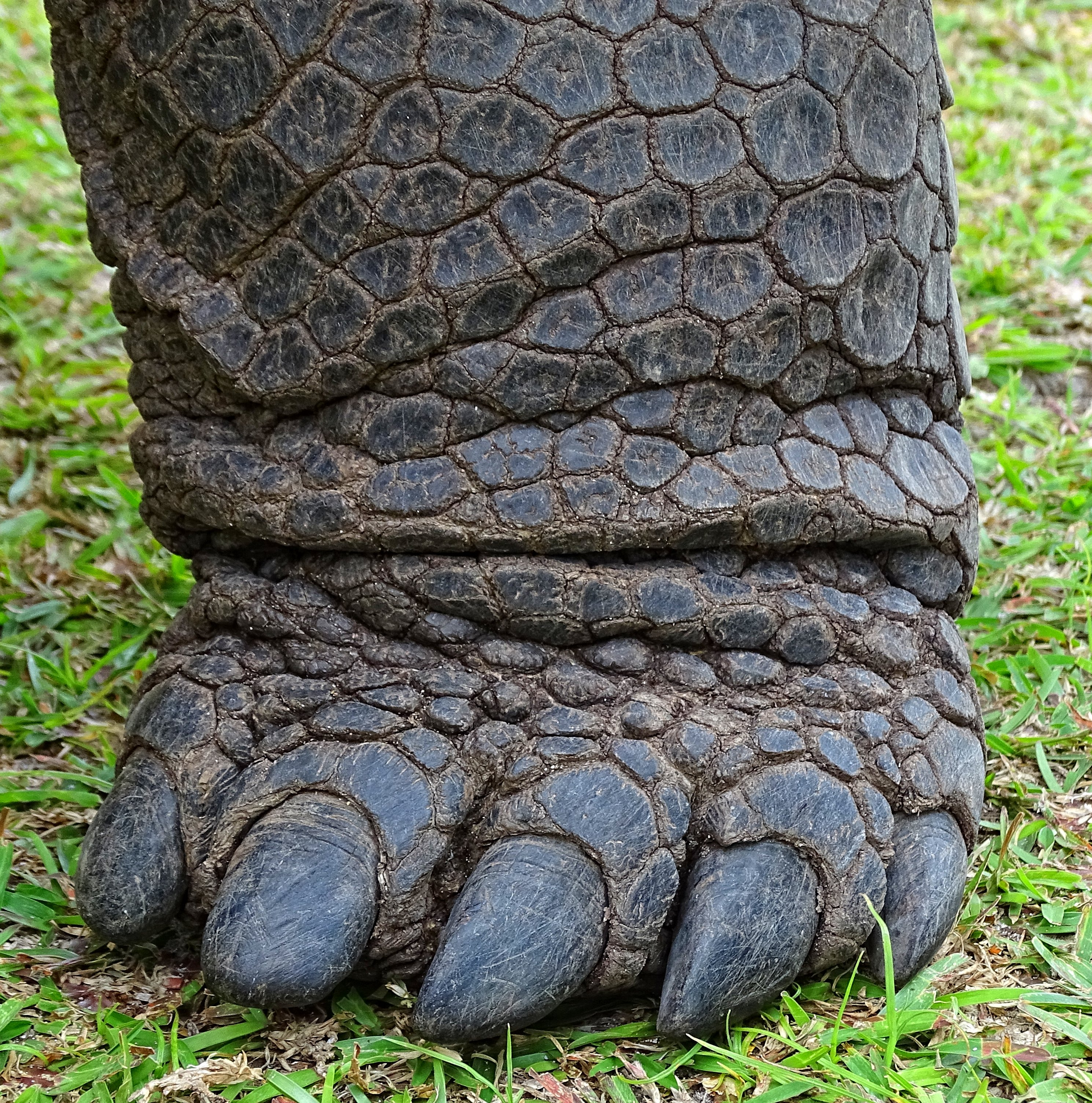
Aldabra giant tortoise foot, an efficient digging tool

Aldabra tortoises are found both individually and in herds, which tend to gather mostly on open grasslands. They are most active in the mornings, when they spend time grazing and browsing for food. They dig wallows, hide under shade trees or in small caves, as well as submerge themselves in pools to keep cool during the heat of the day.

=== Lifespan ===
Large tortoises are among the longest-lived animals. Some individual Aldabra giant tortoises are thought to be over 200 years of age, but this is difficult to verify because they tend to outlive their human observers. Adwaita was reputedly one of four captured by British seamen from the Seychelles Islands as gifts to Robert Clive of the British East India Company in the 18th century, and came to Calcutta Zoo in 1875. At his death in March 2006 at the Kolkata (formerly Calcutta) Zoo in India, Adwaita is reputed to have reached the longest ever measured lifespan of 255 years (birth year 1750).

Jonathan, a Seychelles giant tortoise, is the oldest verified giant tortoise.

Esmeralda, an Aldabra giant tortoise, is second at the age of 182 years, since the death of Harriet, a Galapagos giant tortoise, at 175. An Aldabra giant tortoise living on Changuu off Zanzibar is reportedly 200 years old.

=== Breeding ===
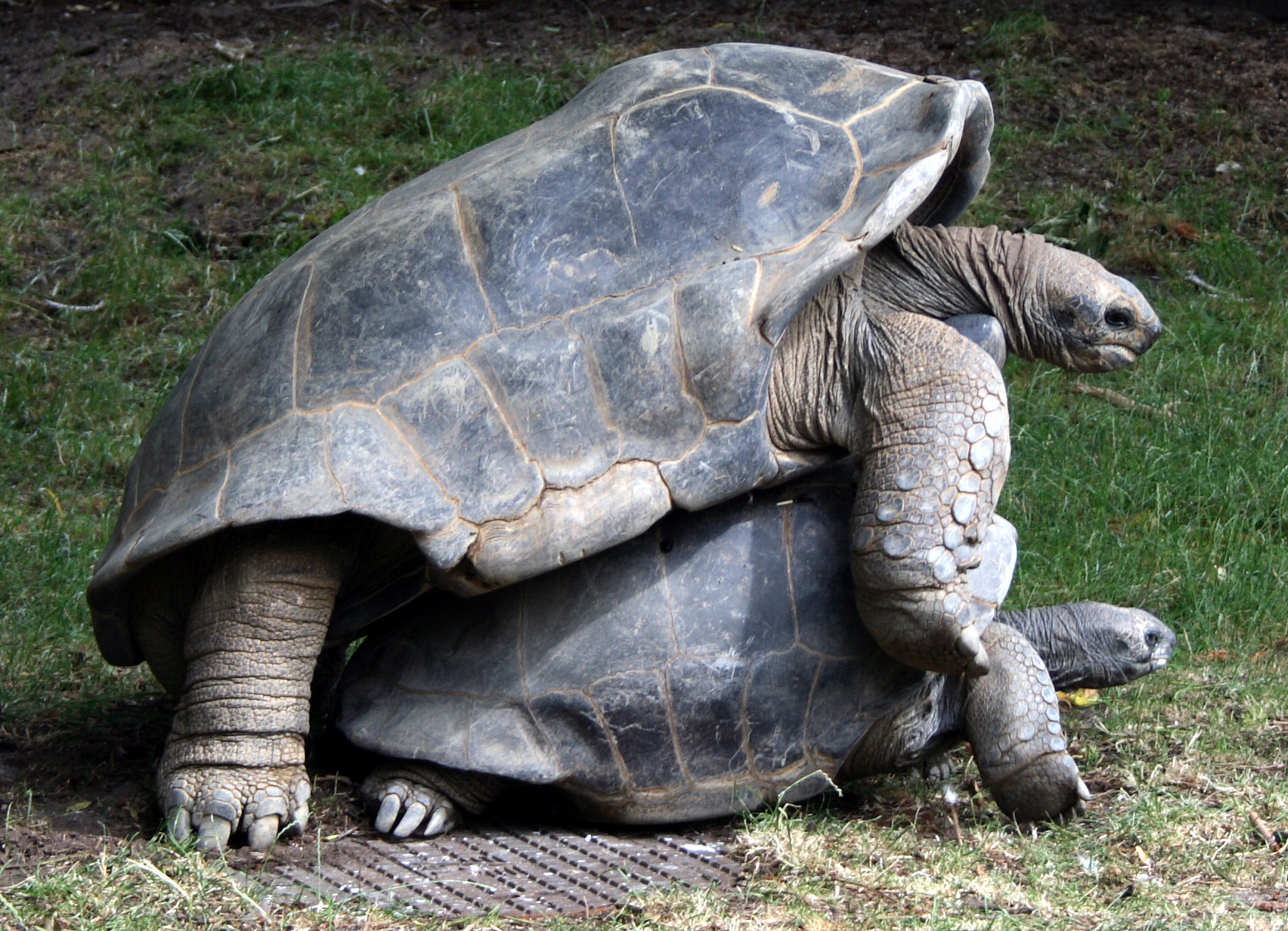
Mating Aldabra giant tortoises

Mating takes place between February and May, and in July-September females lay between 9 and 25 hard-shelled eggs in a 30 cm deep nest. Usually, less than half of the eggs are fertile. Females can produce multiple clutches of eggs in a year. After incubating for about eight months, the tiny, independent young hatch between October and December.

In captivity, oviposition dates vary. Tulsa Zoo maintains a small herd of Aldabra tortoises and they have reproduced several times since 1999. One female typically lays eggs in November and again in January, providing the weather is warm enough to go outside for laying. The zoo also incubates their eggs artificially, keeping two separate incubators at 27 °C (81 °F) and 30 °C (86 °F). On average, the eggs kept at the latter temperature hatch in 107 days.

== Conservation ==
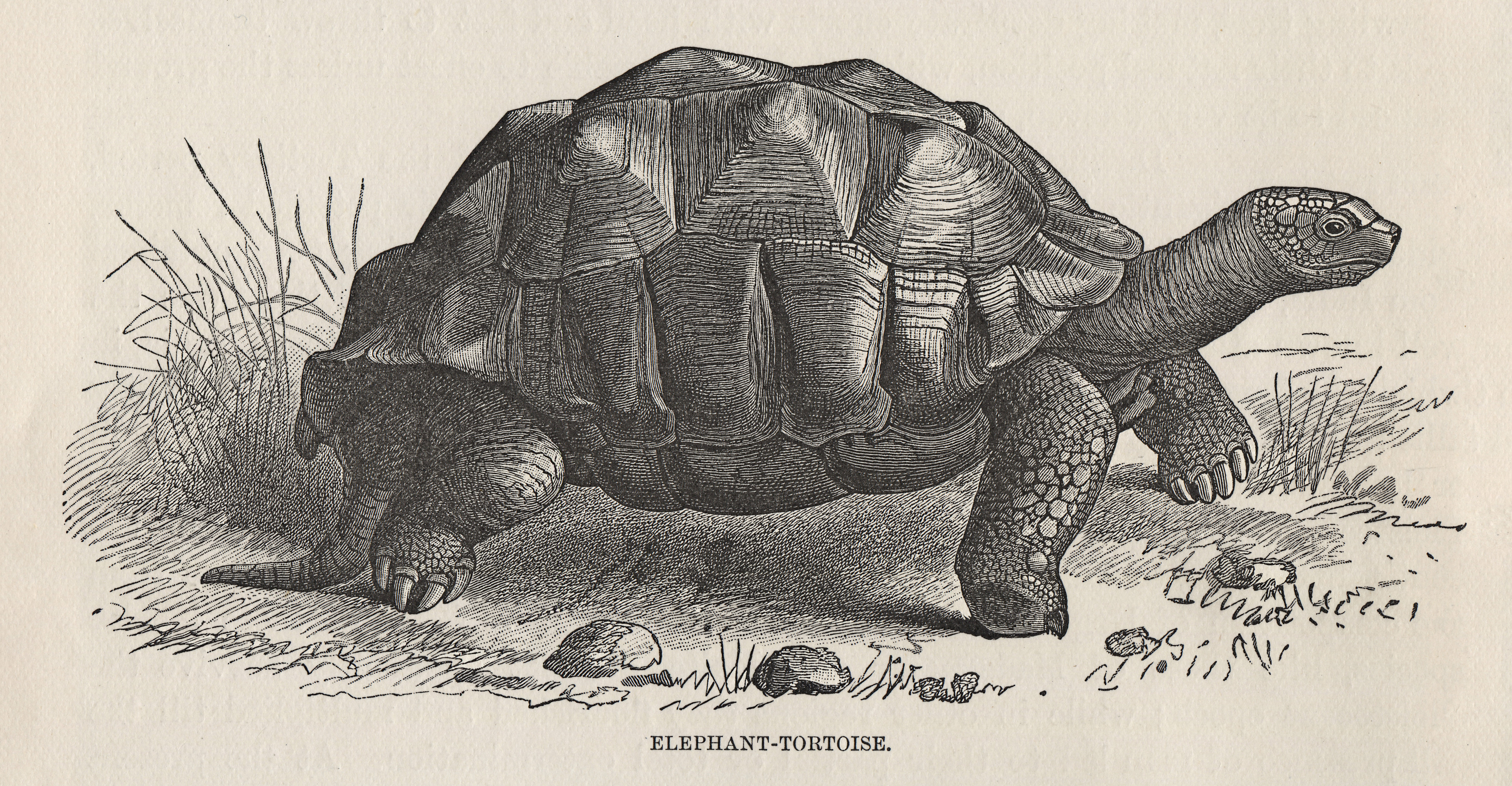
Engraving of an Elephant-Tortoise from "The Royal Natural History" (1896)

The Aldabra giant tortoise has an unusually long history of organized conservation. Albert Günther of the British Museum, who later moved to the Natural History Museum of London, enlisting Charles Darwin and other famous scientists to help him, worked with the government of Mauritius to establish a preserve at the end of the 19th century. The related, but distinct, species of giant tortoise from the Seychelles islands, Seychelles giant tortoise A. g. hololissa and Arnold's giant tortoise A. g. arnoldi, were the subject of a captive-breeding and reintroduction program by the Nature Protection Trust of Seychelles.

A reference genome and low-coverage sequencing analyses has looked at revealing within- and among-island genetic differentiation within the Aldabra population, as well as assigning likely origins for zoo-housed individuals. This has managed to differentiate between individuals sampled on Malabar and Grande Terre and resolve the exact origin of zoo-housed individuals.

== See also ==
- Cylindraspis recently extinct genus of giant tortoises native to the nearby Mascarene Islands of Mauritius, Réunion and Rodrigues in the Indian Ocean
