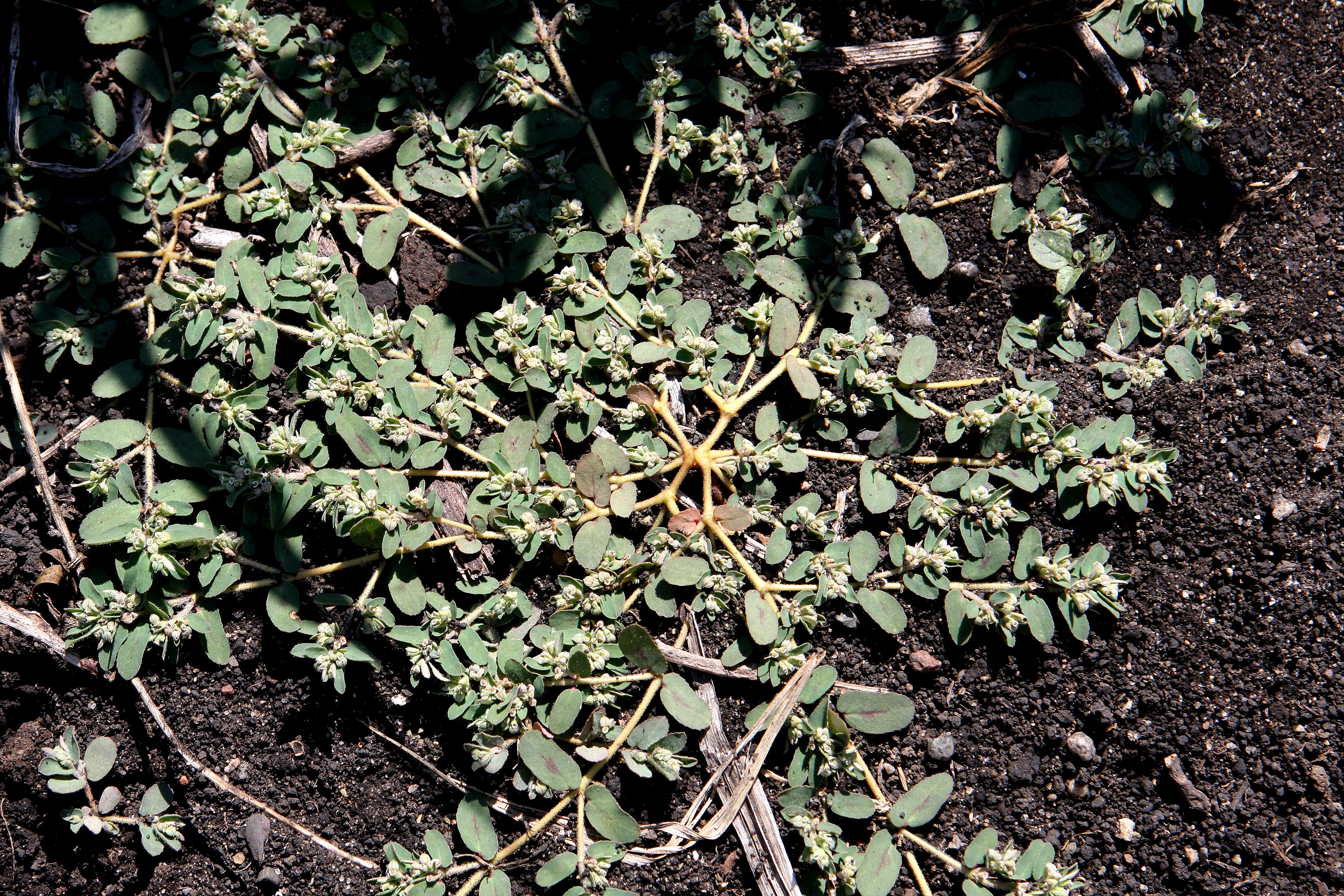

Conservation status
- Secure (NatureServe)

Scientific classification
- Kingdom: Plantae
- Clade: Tracheophytes
- Clade: Angiosperms
- Clade: Eudicots
- Clade: Rosids
- Order: Malpighiales
- Family: Euphorbiaceae
- Genus: Euphorbia
- Species: E. maculata

Binomial name
- Euphorbia maculata L.

Synonyms
- List: Anisophyllum maculatum (L.) Haw.; Chamaesyce jovetii (Huguet) Holub; Chamaesyce maculata (L.) Small; Chamaesyce pseudonutans Thell.; Chamaesyce supina (Raf.) H.Hara; Chamaesyce tracyi Small; Euphorbia depressa Torr. ex Spreng.; Euphorbia jovetii Huguet; Euphorbia maculata var. detonsa Engelm. ex Boiss.; Euphorbia maculata var. parvula Riddell; Euphorbia reichenbachiana Lojac.; Euphorbia supina Raf.; Tithymalus maculatus (L.) Moench; Xamesike depressa (Torr. ex Spreng.) Raf.; Xamesike littoralis Raf.; Xamesike maculata (L.) Raf.; Xamesike supina (Raf.) Raf.

= Euphorbia maculata =

Species of plant

Euphorbia maculata, known as spotted spurge, prostrate spurge (not to be confused with Euphorbia prostrata), milk purslane, or spotted sandmat, is a fast-growing annual plant in the family Euphorbiaceae. It is native to North America, where it is generally considered a common weed. It can be found in disturbed soils such as garden beds, along railroad tracks, and in the cracks of sidewalks. It has become a common introduced species throughout the world, including Europe, Japan, Korea, Australia, and New Zealand.

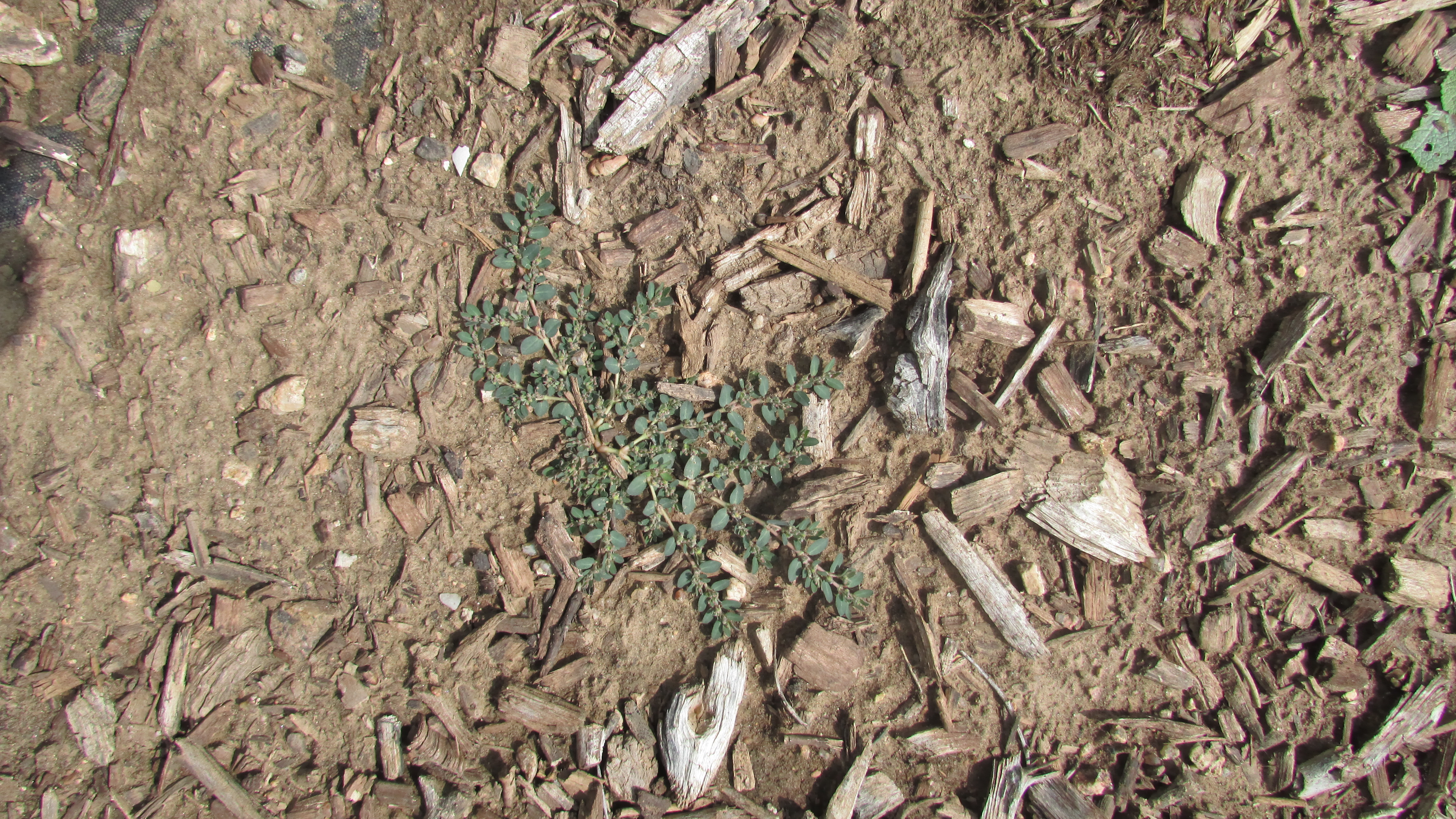
Prostrate sandmat (E. prostrata) growing on disturbed soil.

It grows in sunny locations and a variety of soils, and functions as a pioneer species in ecological succession. The sap of this plant is a mild skin irritant and can cause a rash in some people. The milky sap of plants in genus Euphorbia is poisonous and considered carcinogenic.

== Description ==
As originally described in 1753 by Carl Linnaeus, Euphorbia maculata is an herbaceous plant with small, oblong opposite leaves. The leaves are pilose, or covered in small thin hairs, and generally have a crenate (scalloped) edge. Each leaf is marked with a small brown spot in the center, giving the plant its common name.

Euphorbia maculata is typically prostrate, with specimens rarely reaching as high as 30 centimetres (12 in). The stems spread out in a mat along the ground with each stem rarely greater than 45 centimetres (18 in) long. The leaves are oval but rather elongate, up to 3 centimetres (1.2 in) long. The cyathia, bisexual reproductive structures unique to plants in the genus, are very small, with four white petal-like appendages that are sometimes pink.

Euphorbia maculata flowers in the summer. These flowers develop in clusters near the axillary bud, they are small and leaf-like, with a red calyx. Upon blooming they have lobed, white to pink petals.

Euphorbia maculata develops a small, 3-lobed fruit. This fruit, like the rest of the plant, is covered in fine, soft hairs. Each lobe is a capsule that contains a single seed. The seeds are small, oblong, and white to light brown. The surface is uneven and covered in little divots.

Euphorbia maculata is visually similar to Euphorbia prostrata, but that species has oval leaves that are more rounded at the tips. Euphorbia maculata may also be confused with Euphorbia serpens, but this species has smaller and more rounded leaves, as well as larger cyathia, which are about 0.5mm across.

== Distribution and habitat ==
Euphorbia maculata is considered native to all of the continental United States according to the United States Department of Agriculture. Spotted Spurge has been naturalized in much of the world. This includes South America, Australia, Asia, parts of Africa, and throughout Europe.

Euphorbia maculata is commonly found along roadsides, in the cracks and crevasses of sidewalks, and throughout North America. It grows in sunny and arid areas without much shade. Spotted spurge grows well in coarse soils, such as sand or gravel, but can also be found growing in compacted soils and areas with poor soil. It grows best in conditions in full sun.

== Uses ==
Euphorbia maculata is understood throughout most of North America as a weed, however it is used in Asia as a medicinal plant. The species possesses triterpenoids that when medicinally applied, have anti-inflammatory and anti-proliferative properties. Additionally, the sap can be ingested to act as a laxative or to induce vomiting. It can also be used topically to treat sores, lesions, warts, and soreness.

== Toxicity ==
Euphorbia maculata, like much of the Euphorbiaceae is considered toxic. Its effects may include mild skin irritation, which is amplified when exposed to the sun, irritation to the stomach, and vomiting as well as being generally considered a carcinogen. The toxins come from a thin, white, milky sap that is produced when either the leaf or the stem gets broken. Contact with the eyes, skin, or mouth should be avoided.

== Weed control ==
Because Euphorbia maculata grows quickly in a variety of climates it is seen as a weed throughout much of North America and can be a particularly troublesome weed in crop fields and pastures. The growth of E. maculata in agricultural fields may impact crops yields such as vegetables, legumes, and cereals. Due to toxicity, the growth of Euphorbia maculata in pastures can cause sickness, vomiting, and weakness in livestock.

Pre-emergence herbicides are useful where problems have been known to arise and mulching is not possible. Mechanical control is hand pulling of the entire plant, roots included, to prevent regrowth. Another non-chemical control method is to apply a thick layer of mulch to the affected area. Spotted Spurge grows best in open, sunny areas, so mulching with a layer wood chips or straw prevent may smother the plant.

30 percent vinegar is also an effective and nontoxic herbicide for Spurge Weed as well as many other common weeds.
