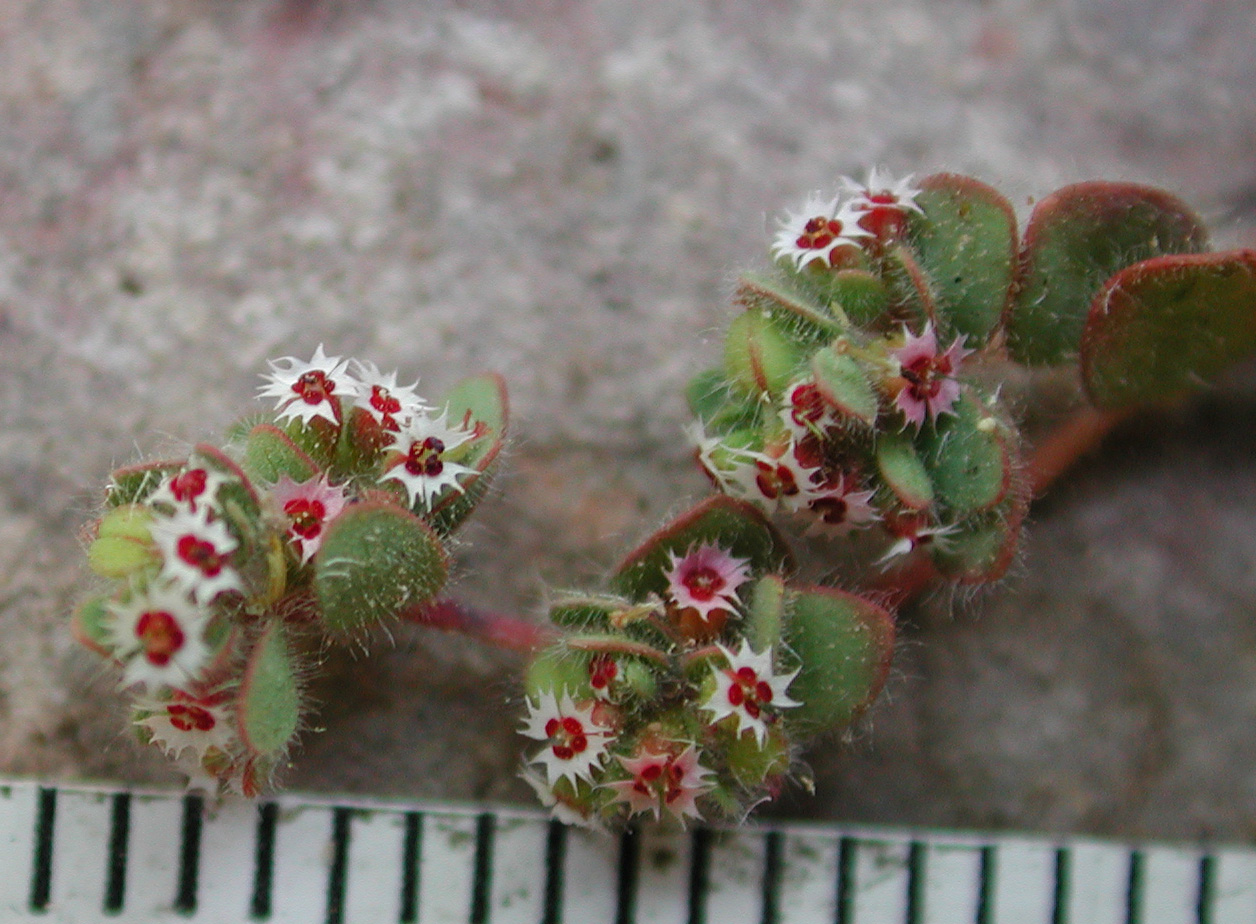

Scientific classification
- Kingdom: Plantae
- Clade: Tracheophytes
- Clade: Angiosperms
- Clade: Eudicots
- Clade: Rosids
- Order: Malpighiales
- Family: Euphorbiaceae
- Genus: Euphorbia
- Species: E. setiloba

Binomial name
- Euphorbia setiloba Engelm. ex Torr.

Synonyms
- Chamaesyce setiloba

= Euphorbia setiloba =

Species of flowering plant

Euphorbia setiloba is a species of euphorb known by the common name Yuma sandmat. It is native to the southwestern United States and northern Mexico, where it grows in dry habitat. This is a small, clumping annual herb with slender stems lined with pairs of tiny hairy leaves. Each leaf is just a few millimeters long and oval in shape with a bluntly pointed tip. The minute inflorescence is a cyathium less than two millimeters wide. It has distinctive appendages which are white with a few narrow, sharp-pointed lobes. There is a red nectar gland at the base of each. At the center of the appendages are the actual flowers, one female and several male. The ovary of the female flower develops into a hairy, spherical fruit about a millimeter wide.
