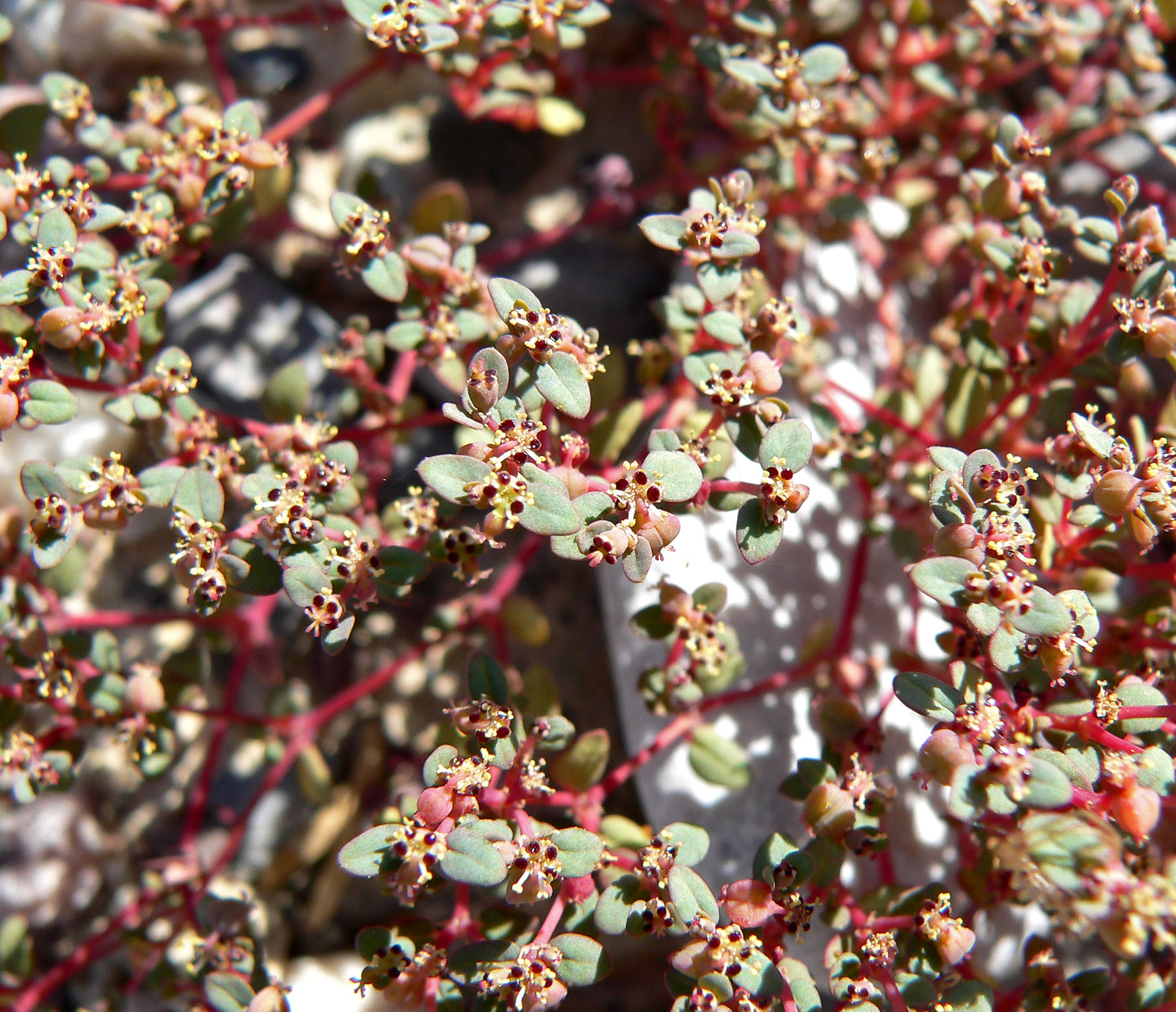

Scientific classification
- Kingdom: Plantae
- Clade: Embryophytes
- Clade: Tracheophytes
- Clade: Spermatophytes
- Clade: Angiosperms
- Clade: Eudicots
- Clade: Rosids
- Order: Malpighiales
- Family: Euphorbiaceae
- Genus: Euphorbia
- Species: E. micromera

Binomial name
- Euphorbia micromera (Boiss. ex Engelm.)

Synonyms
- Chamaesyce micromera (Boiss.) Wooton & Standl. Chamaesyce pseudoserpyllifolia (Millsp.) Millsp. Euphorbia podagrica I.M.Johnst. Euphorbia pseudoserpyllifolia Millsp. Euphorbia pseudoserpyllifolia f. typica J.T.Howell; Euphorbia pseudoserpyllifolia f. villosa J.T.Howell; Euphorbia setiloba var. nodulosa Jeps.

= Euphorbia micromera =

Species of flowering plant

Euphorbia micromera is a species of flowering plant in the family Euphorbiaceae. It is known by the common name Sonoran sandmat. It is native to the southwestern United States from California to Texas, and northern Mexico, where it grows in sandy soils in desert and other dry habitat. It is an annual herb forming a small mat of slender stems. The hairy to hairless leaves are oblong in shape and just a few millimeters long. The tiny inflorescence is a cyathium less than a millimeter wide. It lacks the appendages that many similar species have in their cyathia. It has only a central female flower and 2 to 5 male flowers surrounded by round red nectar glands. The fruit is a minute round capsule.
