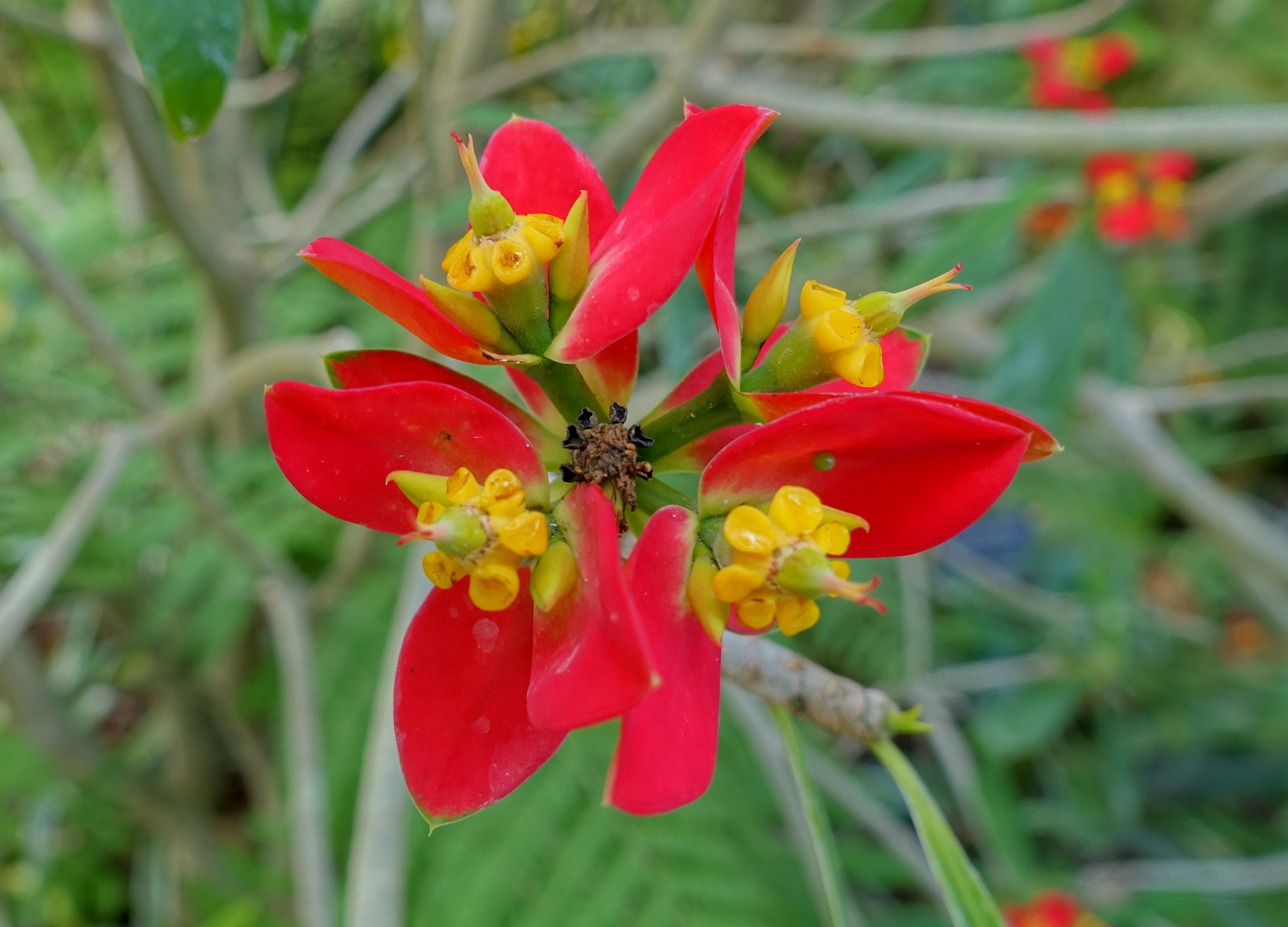

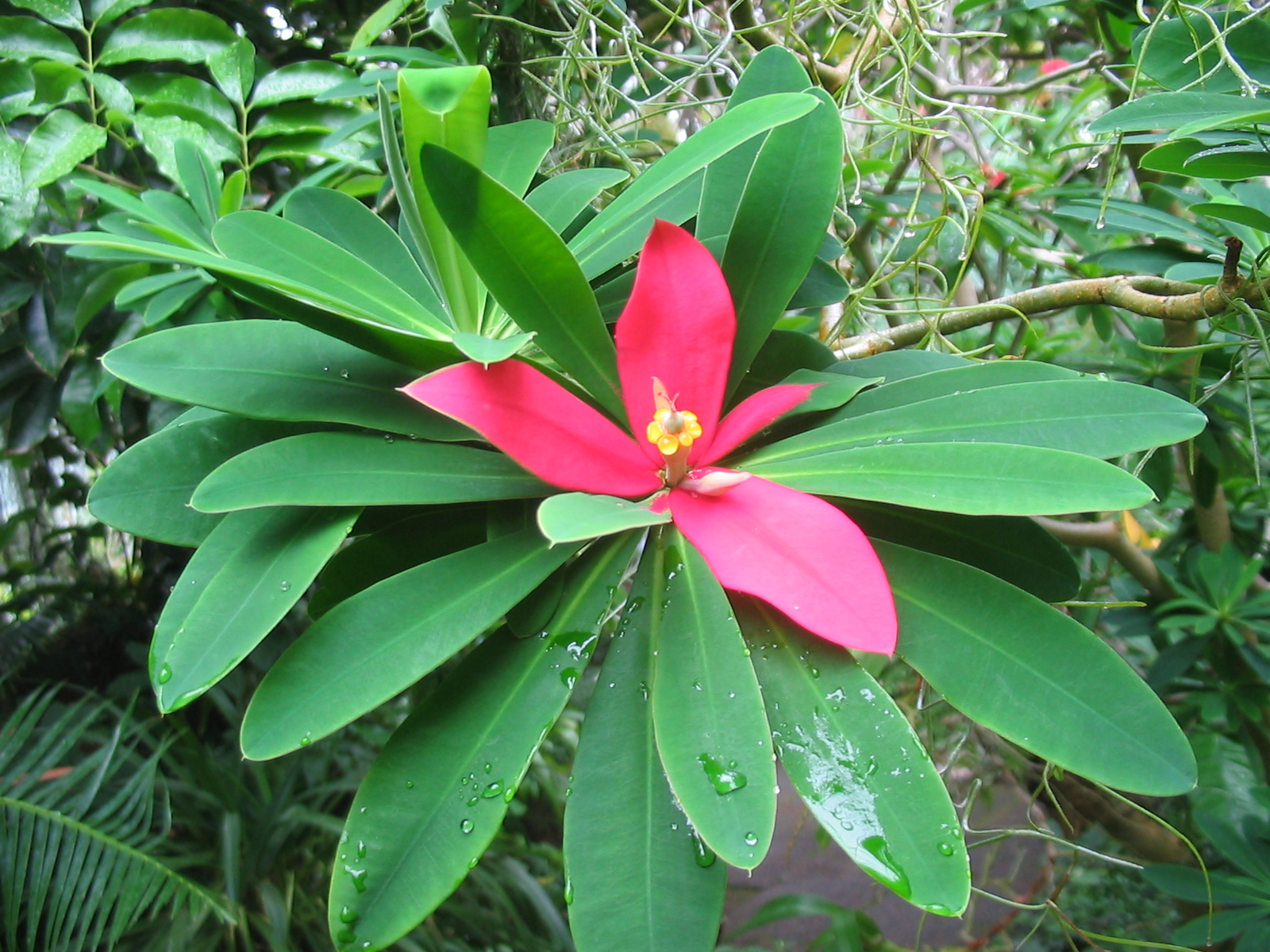

Scientific classification
- Kingdom: Plantae
- Clade: Tracheophytes
- Clade: Angiosperms
- Clade: Eudicots
- Clade: Rosids
- Order: Malpighiales
- Family: Euphorbiaceae
- Genus: Euphorbia
- Species: E. punicea

Binomial name
- Euphorbia punicea Sw.

Synonyms
- Adenorima punicea (Sw.) Raf.; Euphorbia troyana Urb.; Euphorbiodendron puniceum (Sw.) Millsp.; Euphorbiodendron troyanum (Urb.) Millsp.; Poinsettia punicea (Sw.) Klotzsch & Garcke; Tithymalus puniceus (Sw.) Haw.

= Euphorbia punicea =

Species of flowering plant

Euphorbia punicea is a species of euphorb commonly known as Jamaican poinsettia. It was first described by Olof Peter Swartz in his Nova genera et species plantarum seu prodromus. It grows as a bush or tree three to five meters (10–16 ft) tall, and sometimes much taller. The false flower is in fact a cyathium surrounded by large, colorful bracts.

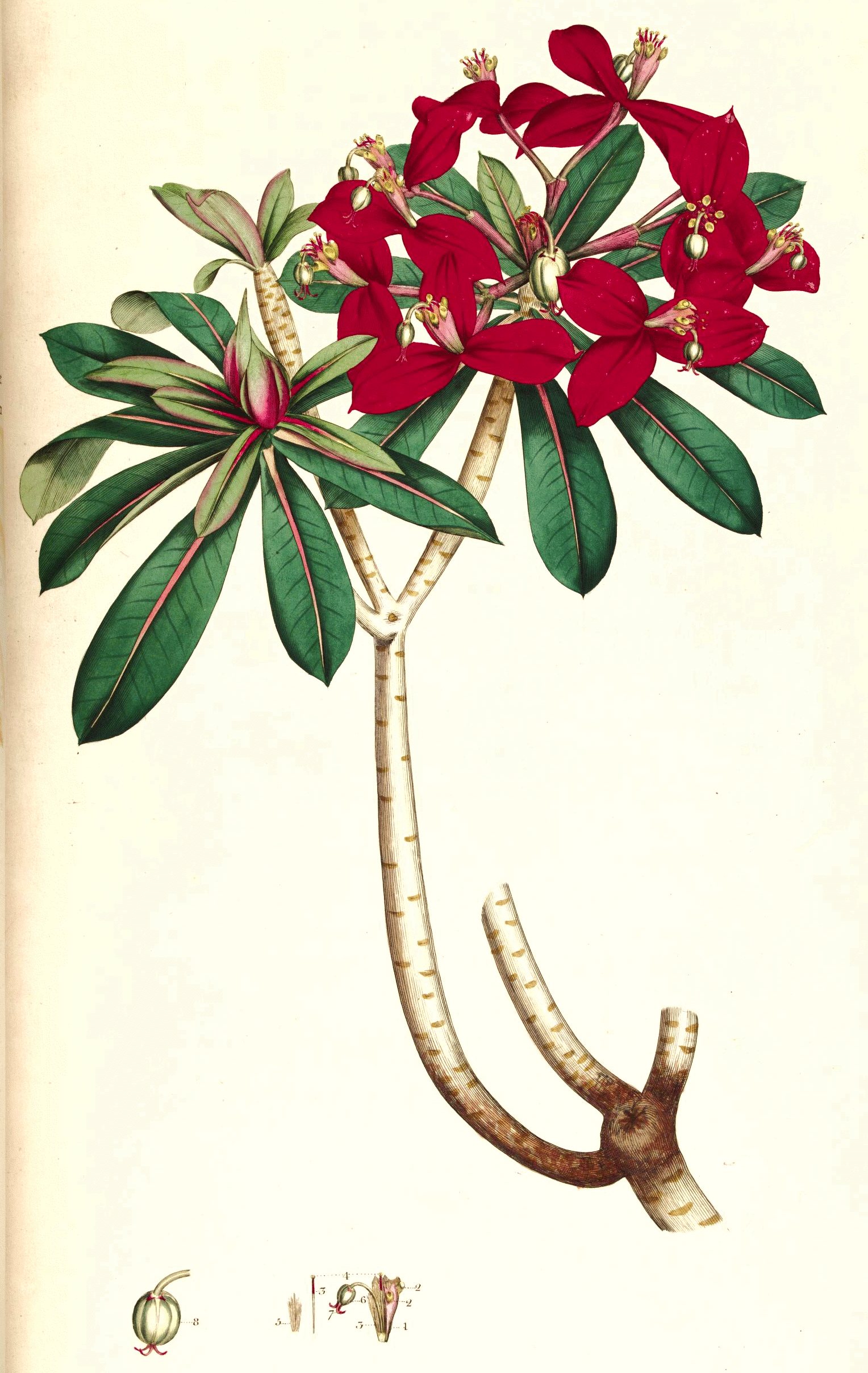
Drawing from James Edward Smith and James Sowerby
