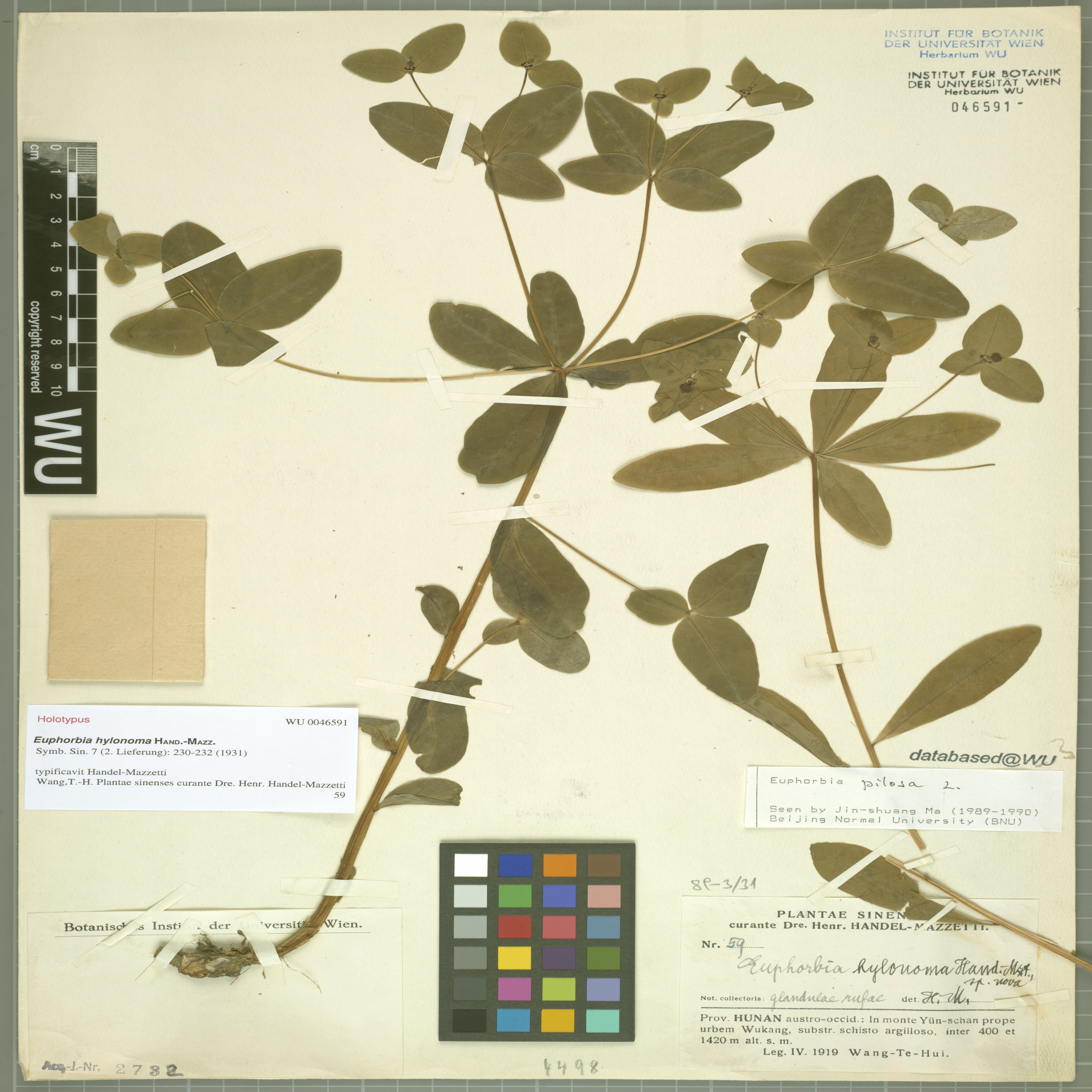

Scientific classification
- Kingdom: Plantae
- Clade: Tracheophytes
- Clade: Angiosperms
- Clade: Eudicots
- Clade: Rosids
- Order: Malpighiales
- Family: Euphorbiaceae
- Genus: Euphorbia
- Species: E. hylonoma

Binomial name
- Euphorbia hylonoma Hand.-Mazz.

= Euphorbia hylonoma =

Species of flowering plant

Euphorbia hylonoma is a species of flowering plant in the family Euphorbiaceae, native to China and the Far East of Russia (Primorsky krai). It grows on roadsides, valleys, mountain slopes, grasslands, steppes, scrub, sparse forests at elevations of 2,000–3,000 metres (6,600–9,800 ft). This herbaceous plant is erect, reaching a height of 50–90 cm (20–35 in). It has thick roots measuring over 10 cm (3.9 in) in length and 3–5 mm (0.12–0.20 in) in diameter. The stem is branched at the top and has a thickness of 3–7 mm (0.12–0.28 in). The leaves are alternate, oblong to elliptic, with a size range of 4–10 cm (1.6–3.9 in) × 1–2 cm (0.39–0.79 in). The flowers are grouped in cyathia, with male flowers extending beyond the involucre and female flowers having pedicels. The capsule is globose and smooth, and the seeds are ovoid-globose, gray or light brown in color, and have a slightly striated surface. Flowering from April to June.

The root of the plant is used in Chinese folk medicine to relieve constipation, bloating, cirrhosis of the liver. The roots are dug out and dried in the sun in the fall. The milky latex of the plant is toxic and can cause irritation on contact with the skin.
