= Euphorbia stoddartii =

Scientific classification
- Kingdom: Plantae
- Clade: Tracheophytes
- Clade: Angiosperms
- Clade: Eudicots
- Clade: Rosids
- Order: Malpighiales
- Family: Euphorbiaceae
- Genus: Euphorbia
- Species: E. stoddartii

Binomial name
- Euphorbia stoddartii Fosberg

Species of flowering plant

Euphorbia stoddartii is a species of flowering plant in the family Euphorbiaceae, native the western Indian Ocean, where it is found on Aldabra, the Chagos Archipelago, and Agaléga in Mauritius. First formally described in 1978, it is named after David R. Stoddart. It is a green to purple perennial herb with a highly variable morphology. It grows thin stems that sprout from a common root crown and spread horizontally along the ground. It has oval-shaped, fleshy leaves 3 mm × 1 mm–2 mm (0.1 in × 0.04 in–0.08 in) in size. It is a common and widespread plant where it occurs, especially on sandy soils.

== Taxonomy ==
Euphorbia stoddartii was formally described by Francis Raymond Fosberg in 1978 on the basis of specimens collected from the Aldabra Group, a collection of coral atolls in the western Indian Ocean administered by the Seychelles. It is named after David R. Stoddart, a specimen collector and geographer who had previously worked on Aldabra. Fosberg placed the species in the subgenus Chamaesyce, and postulated that it may be most closely related to the species E. prostrata.

== Description ==
Euphorbia stoddartii is a green to purple perennial herb with a highly variable morphology. The thin stems, which grow horizontally along the ground, sprout from a common root crown. The oval-shaped, fleshy leaves are opposite and measure up to 3 mm × 1 mm–2 mm (0.1 in × 0.04 in–0.08 in) in size. The flowers and fruits can be either smooth and hairless or covered with fine hair, depending on the individual. There is occasionally an upright branch that emerges from the root crown, which is usually hairless.

== Distribution ==
Euphorbia stoddartii is endemic to the western Indian Ocean, where it occurs on a number of widely separated archipelagos. It is known from the Aldabra Group in the Seychelles, Agaléga in Mauritius, and Salomon Atoll in the Chagos Archipelago, administered as part of the British Indian Ocean Territory. It is also known from the Glorioso Islands, a French dependency in the Comoro Islands. It may also be native to the Amirante Islands and other western Indian Ocean islands.

The spurge is a common and widespread plant where it occurs, being especially partial to sandy soils. On Aldabra, it is commonly found as part of coastal turf vegetation dominated by Sporobolus virginicus and heavily grazed "tortoise turf" growing on calcareous soil. Both of these vegetation types are used as pasture by the native giant tortoises of Aldabra.
