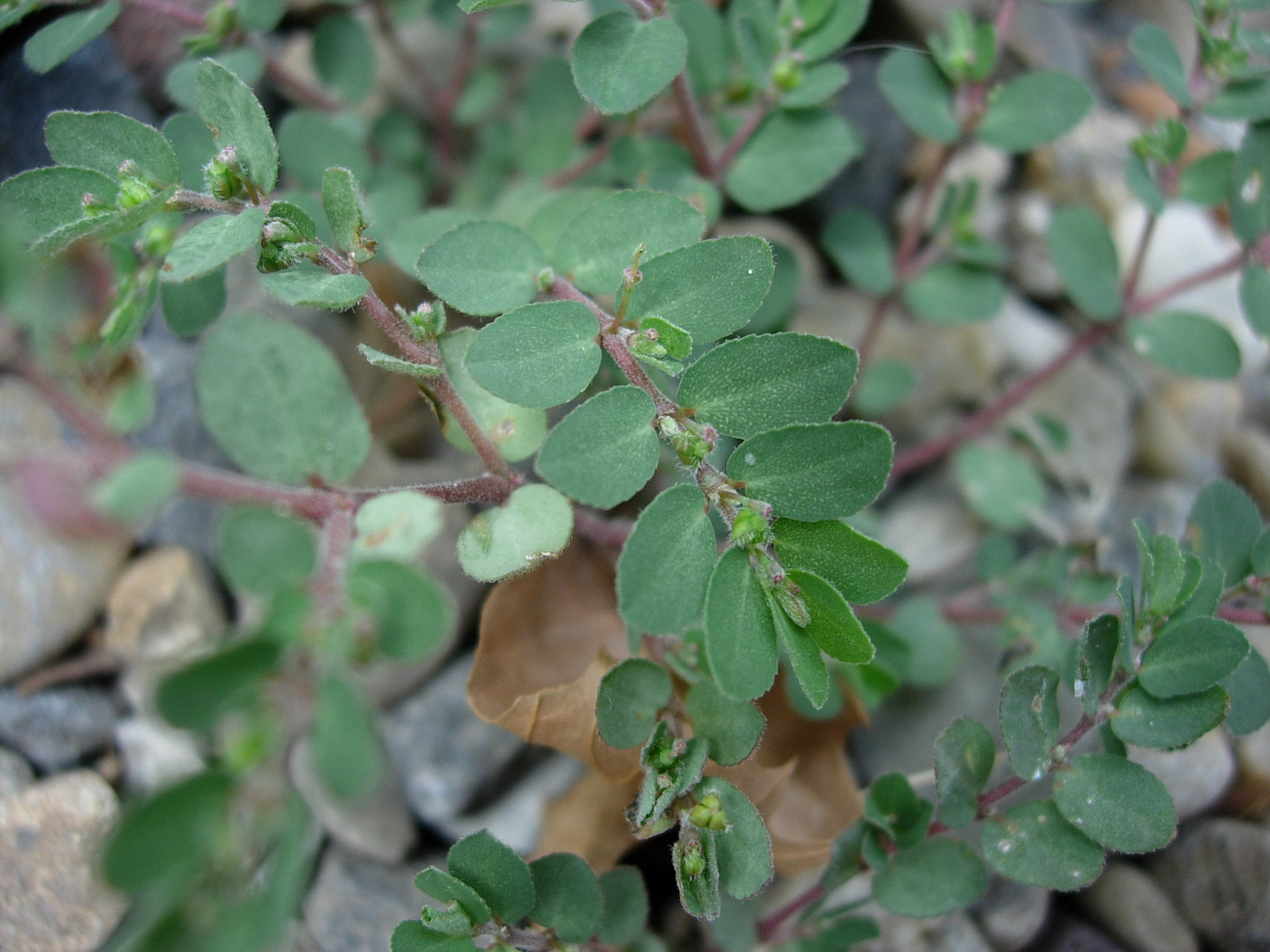

Conservation status
- Secure (NatureServe)

Scientific classification
- Kingdom: Plantae
- Clade: Tracheophytes
- Clade: Angiosperms
- Clade: Eudicots
- Clade: Rosids
- Order: Malpighiales
- Family: Euphorbiaceae
- Genus: Euphorbia
- Species: E. prostrata

Binomial name
- Euphorbia prostrata Aiton

Synonyms
- Anisophyllum prostratum (Aiton) Haw.; Aplarina prostrata (Aiton) Raf.; Chamaesyce malaca Small; Chamaesyce prostrata (Aiton) Small; Chamaesyce villosior (Greenm.) Millsp.; Euphorbia callitrichoides Kunth; Euphorbia malaca (Small) Little; Euphorbia perforata Guss.; Euphorbia prostrata var. caudirhiza Fosberg; Euphorbia prostrata var. vestita Engelm. ex Boiss.; Euphorbia ramosa var. villosior Greenm.; Euphorbia tenella Kunth; Euphorbia trichogona Bertol.; Tithymalus prostratus (Aiton) Samp.

= Euphorbia prostrata =

Species of flowering plant

Euphorbia prostrata is a species of spurge known by the common name prostrate spurge or prostrate sandmat.

It is native to the Caribbean, most of South America, Central America, Mexico, and most of the United States. It is widely naturalized in many other parts of the world, where it can be found in varied habitat types, and in many areas grows as a roadside weed.

== Description ==
Euphorbia prostrata is an annual herb producing slender prostrate stems up to approximately 20 centimetres (7.9 in) long, sometimes purple-tinted in color. The oval-shaped leaves are up to one centimetre (0.39 in) long with finely toothed edges.

The inflorescence is a cyathium less than two millimetres (0.079 in) wide, with white petal-like appendages surrounding the actual flowers. There are four male flowers and a single female flower, the latter developing into a lobed, hairy fruit one to two millimetres (0.039 to 0.079 in) wide.

E. prostrata is similar to both Euphorbia maculata and Euphorbia serpens, but is often hairy on the leaves and stems, while the latter two species are often smooth. It differs from E. maculata by its less elongated and less lanceolate leaves. E. serpens by contrast has much more rounded leaves than E. prostrata with relatively larger and more conspicuous flowers. The flowers of E. prostrata do not typically show the white "petals" seen in E. serpens or E. maculata and thus flowers are hard to detect in the former species. Only E. maculata shows dark spots in the center of each leaf, but this is not always present in that species.

== Uses ==
In the Grenadines, Cuba, and Venezuela, Euphorbia prostrata was used in traditional medicine as a decoction or poultice.

== Gallery ==
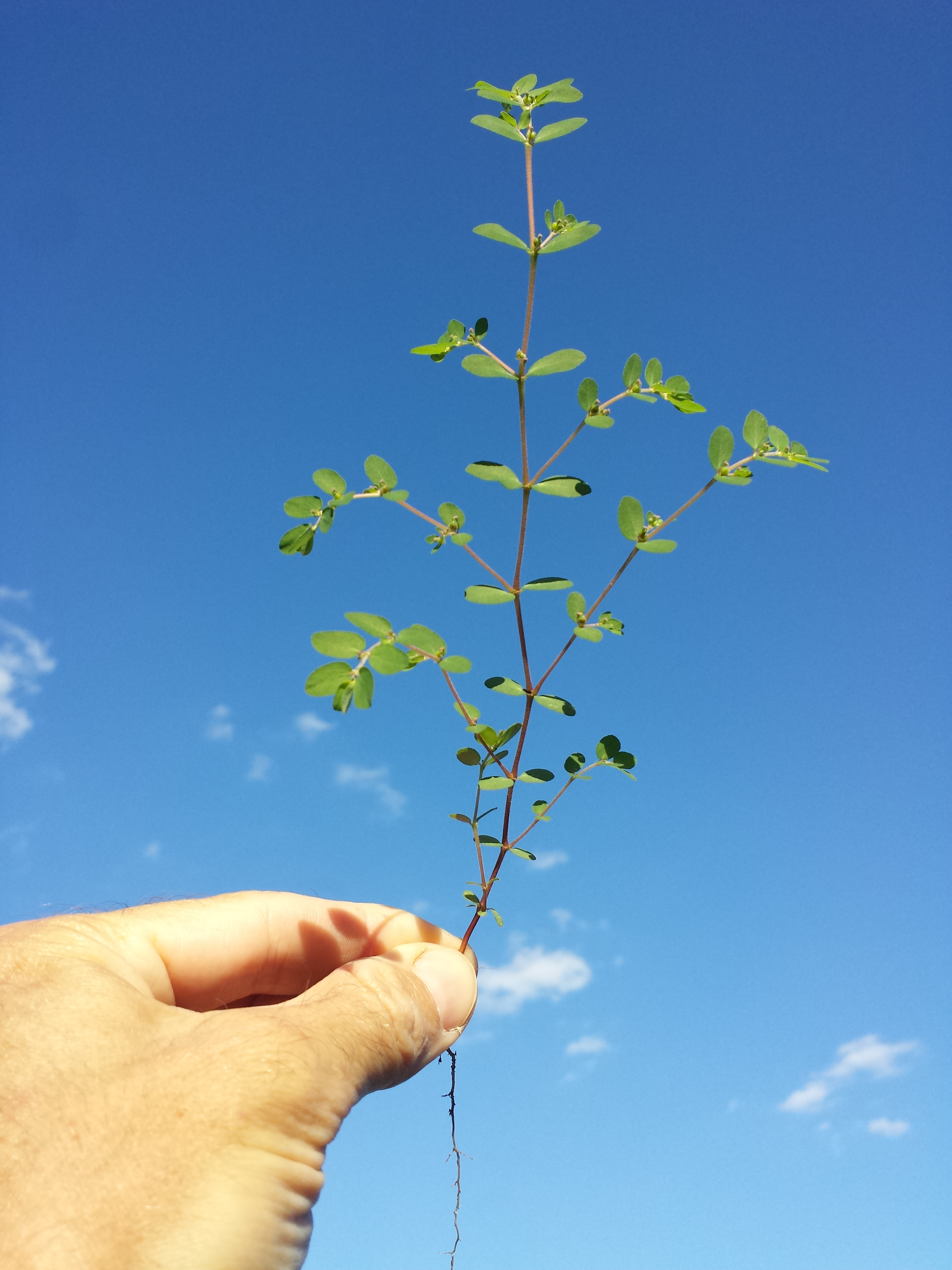
Uprooted plant

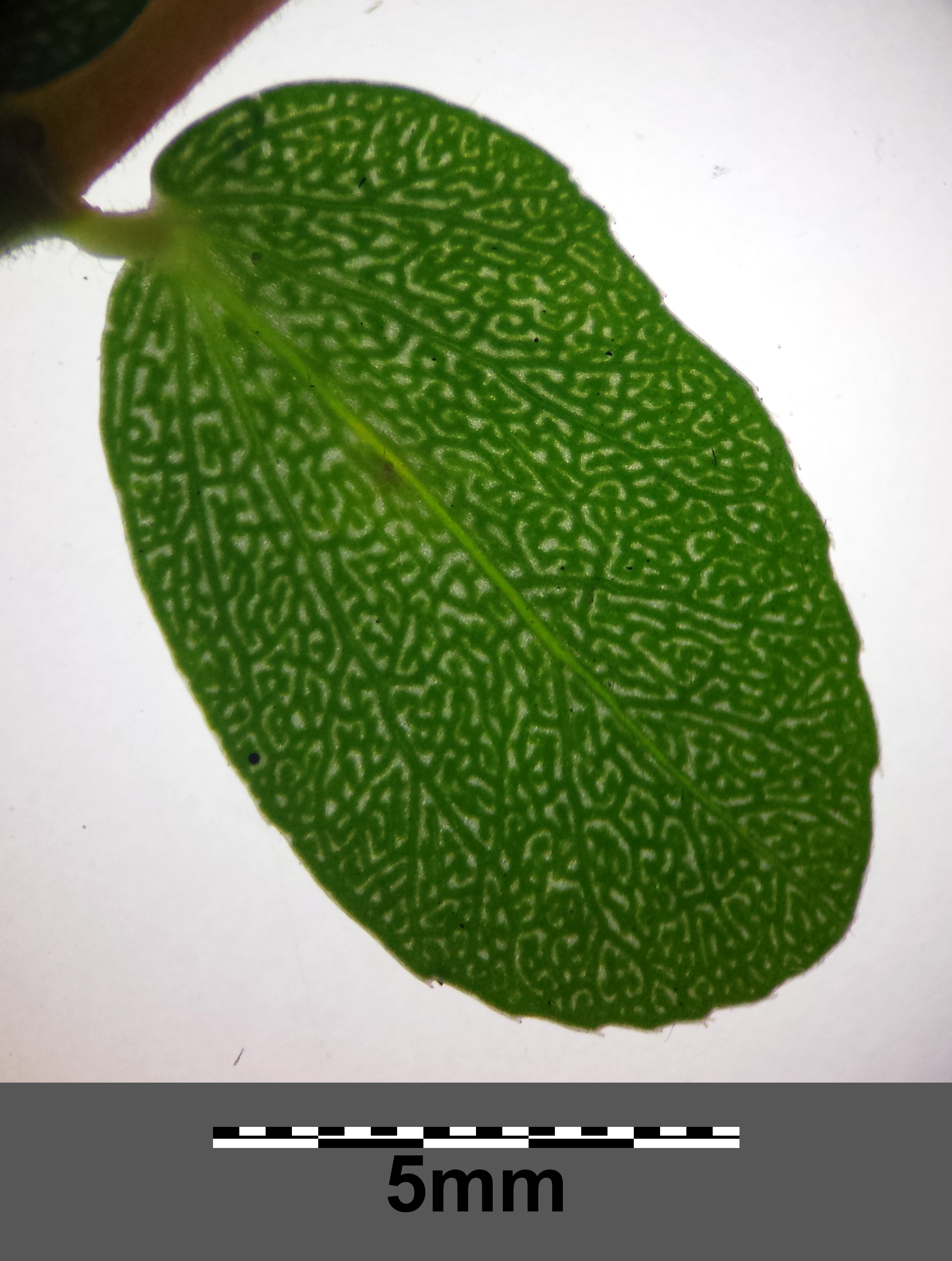
Leaf with transmitted light

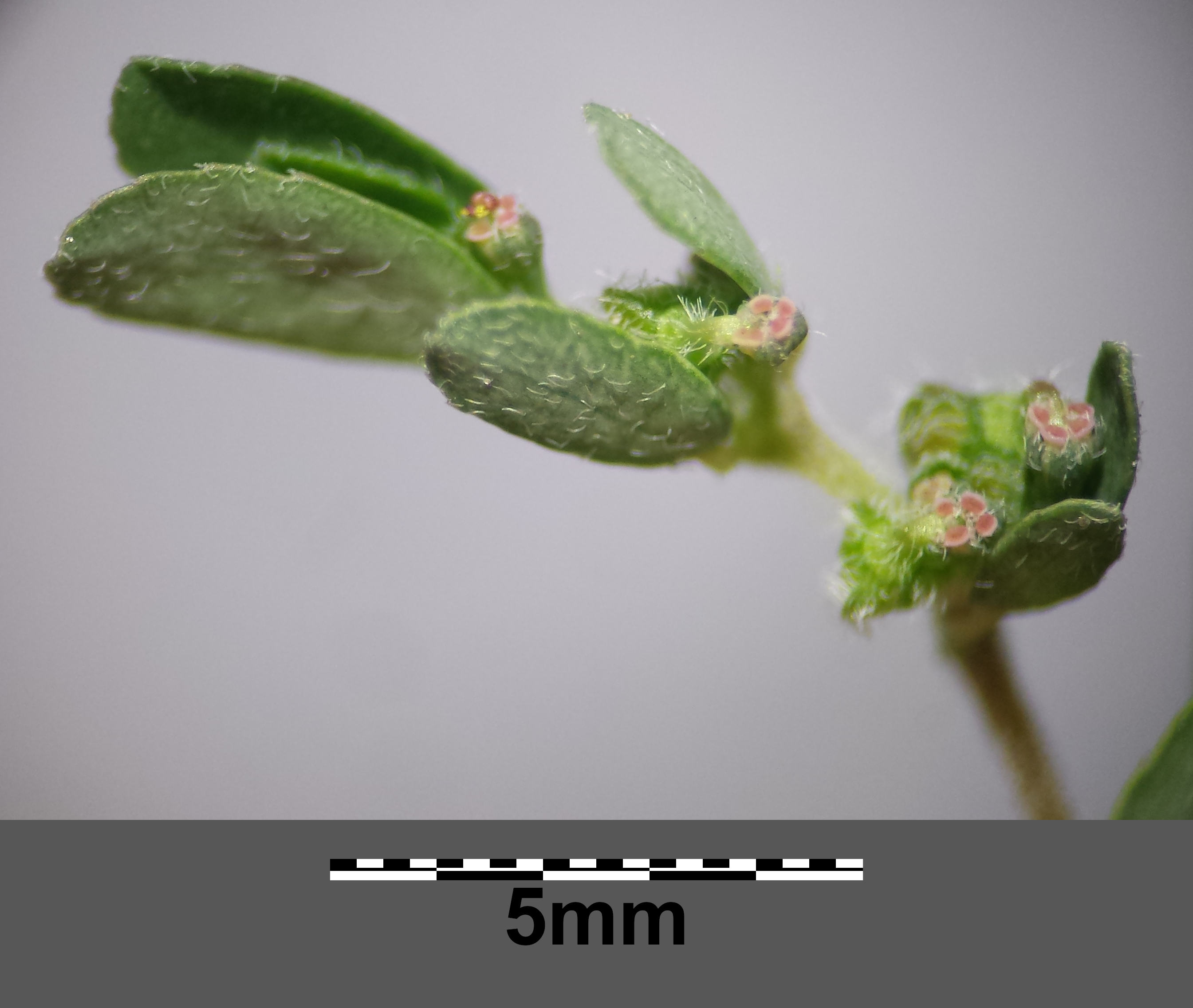
Inflorescence

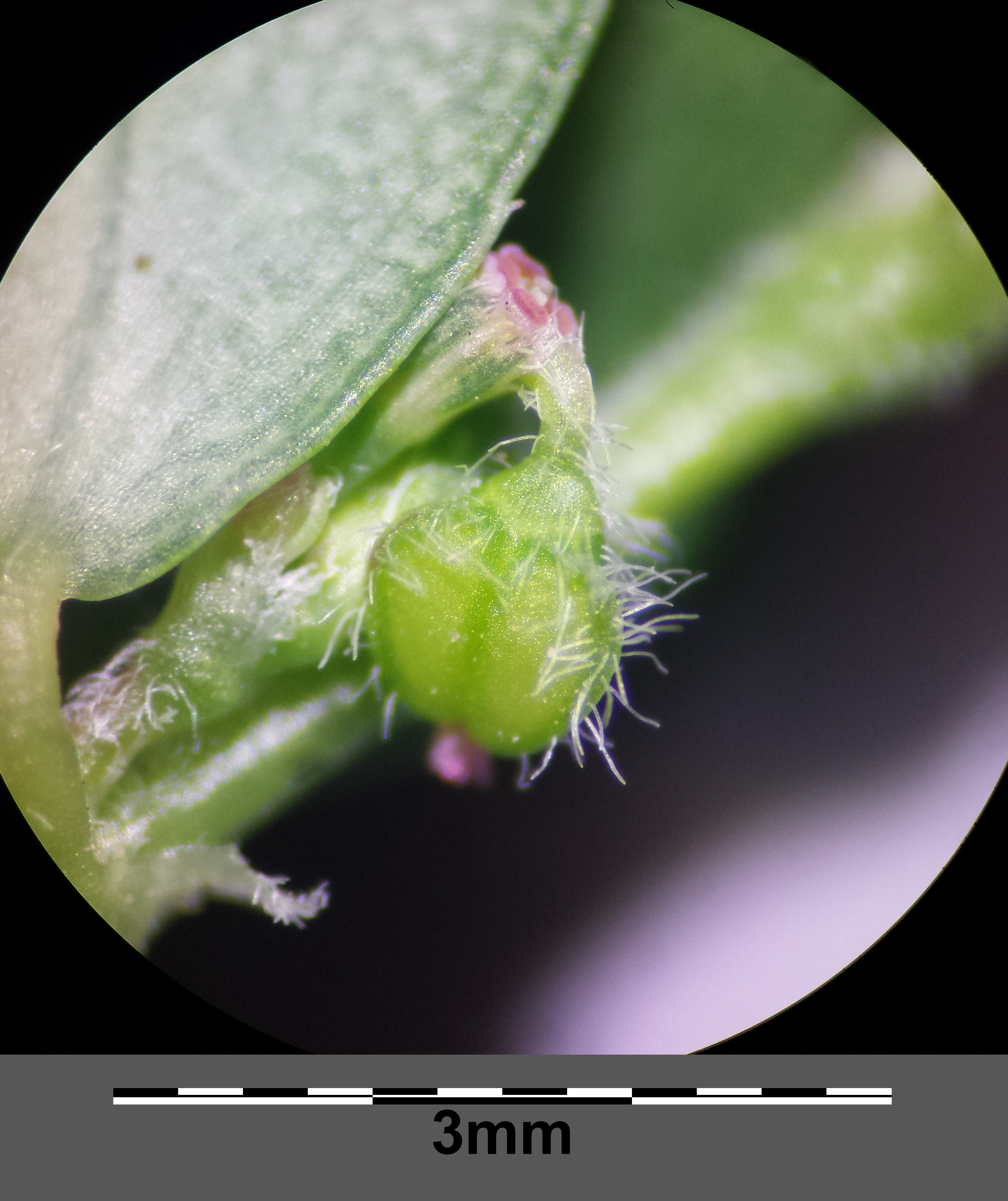
Fruit

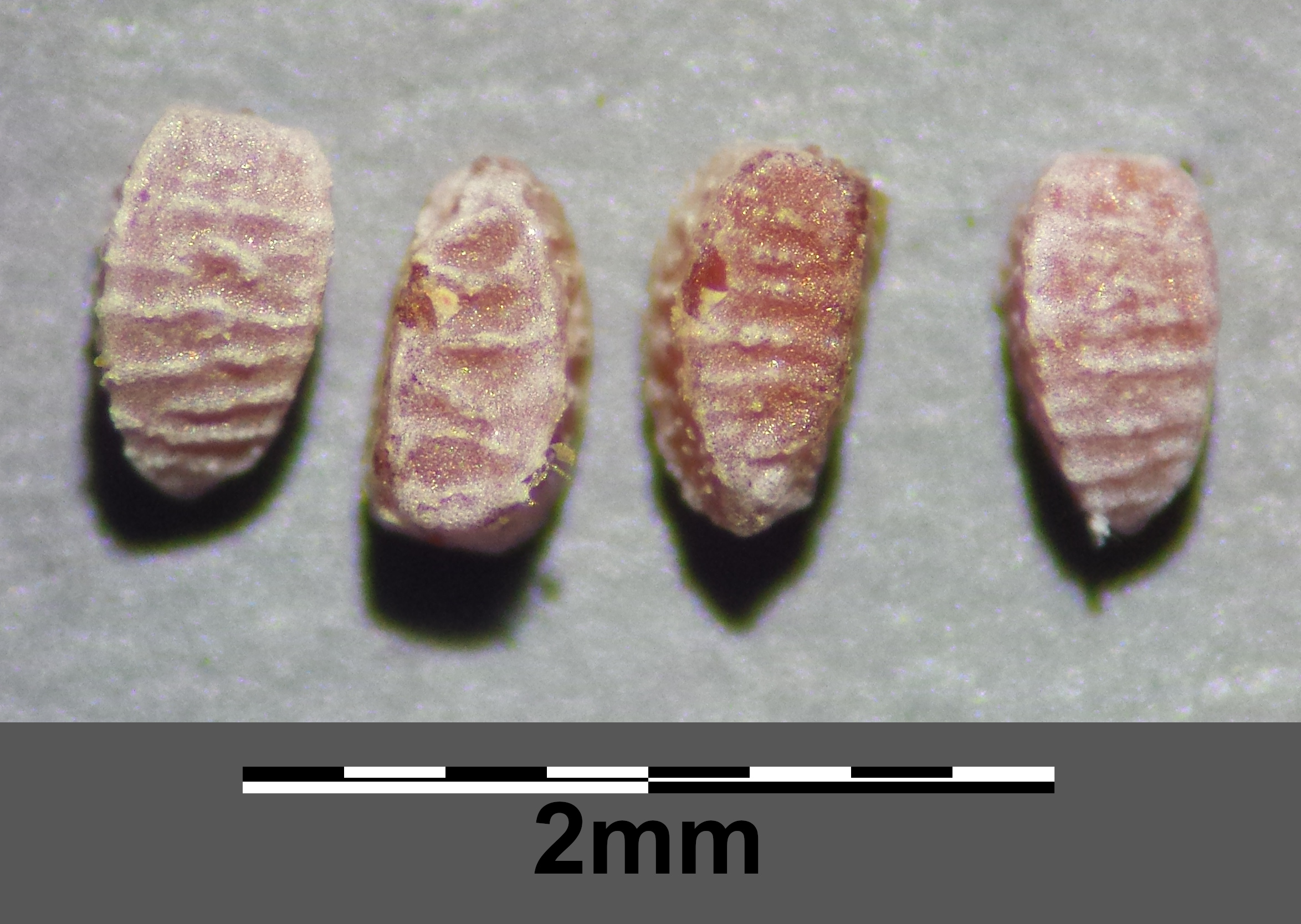
Seeds

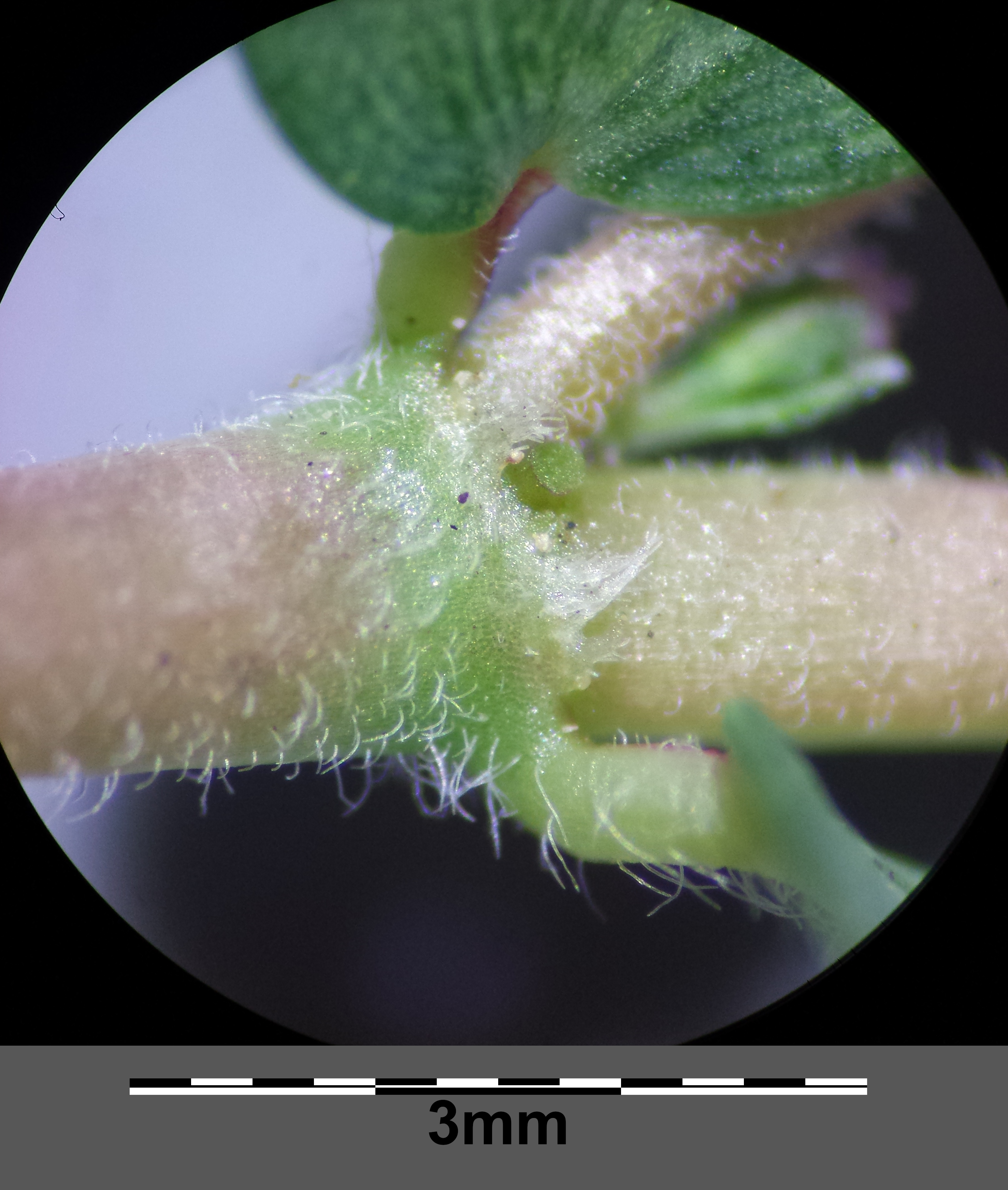
Stem with stipules
