= Cyperus dubius =

Scientific classification
- Kingdom: Plantae
- Clade: Tracheophytes
- Clade: Angiosperms
- Clade: Monocots
- Clade: Commelinids
- Order: Poales
- Family: Cyperaceae
- Genus: Cyperus
- Species: C. dubius

Binomial name
- Cyperus dubius Rottb.

Species of plant in the sedge family

Cyperus dubius, the soft sedge, is one of around 700 species of Cyperus in the sedge family, Cyperaceae. It is found throughout in tropical Africa, South India, and Indo-China to Malesia. It grows in seasonally flooded areas and in pockets of soil among rocks. It is not confined to wetlands and is sometimes found as a weed in fields, near the sea on sandy beaches (Cook 1996) and also seen in open shady places.

== Description ==
Cyperus dubius is a perennial herb, clustered, crowded; with culms 8–40 cm (3.1–16 in) tall, bluntly to sharply triangular, bases bulbous. It has many linear leaves, 1–5 mm wide, which are scabrid on the margins and veins. The flowers are borne in green, greenish-white or white tinged green, hemispherical to ovoid clusters.

== Distribution ==
It is native to Bangladesh, Burundi, Côte d'Ivoire, Equatorial Guinea, Ethiopia, India (Andhra Pradesh, Karnataka, Kerala, Madhya Pradesh, Tamil Nadu), Indonesia, Kenya, Madagascar, Malaysia, Philippines, South Africa, Sri Lanka, Sudan, Tanzania, Thailand, Uganda and Zimbabwe.

== See also ==
- List of Cyperus species
