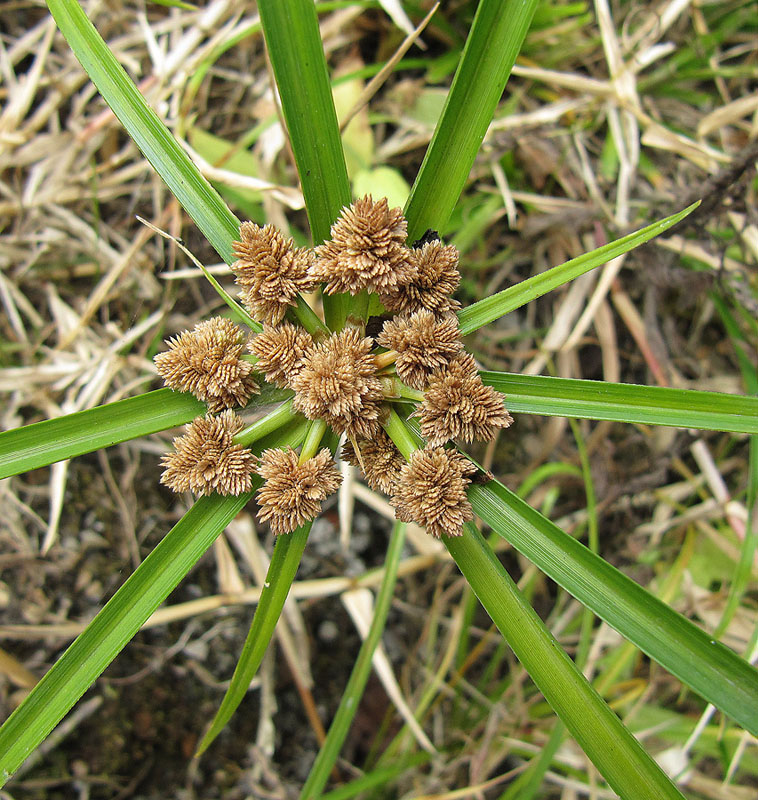

Scientific classification
- Kingdom: Plantae
- Clade: Tracheophytes
- Clade: Angiosperms
- Clade: Monocots
- Clade: Commelinids
- Order: Poales
- Family: Cyperaceae
- Genus: Cyperus
- Species: C. ligularis

Binomial name
- Cyperus ligularis L., 1759

= Cyperus ligularis =

Alabama Swamp Flatsedge

Species of sedge

Cyperus ligularis, the alabama swamp flatsedge, is a species of sedge that is native to southern parts of North America, Central America and northern parts of South America as well as along the east coast of Africa.

== See also ==
- List of Cyperus species
