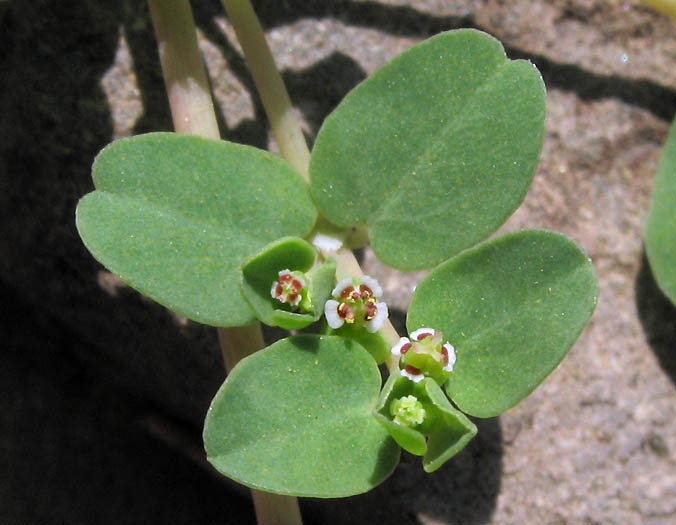

Conservation status
- Secure (NatureServe)

Scientific classification
- Kingdom: Plantae
- Clade: Tracheophytes
- Clade: Angiosperms
- Clade: Eudicots
- Clade: Rosids
- Order: Malpighiales
- Family: Euphorbiaceae
- Genus: Euphorbia
- Species: E. serpens

Binomial name
- Euphorbia serpens Kunth

Synonyms
- Chamaesyce serpens

= Euphorbia serpens =

Species of flowering plant

Euphorbia serpens is a species of Euphorbia known by the common name matted sandmat. It is native to the Americas but it can be found on most continents as an introduced species and often a weed.

== Description ==
This is an annual herb forming a mat of prostrate stems which root at nodes where the stem comes in contact with the ground. The oval leaves occur in oppositely arranged pairs, each leaf less than a centimeter long. The inflorescence is a cyathium with scalloped white petal-like appendages surrounding the actual flowers. A red nectar gland is at the base of each appendage, and at the center of the cyathium are several male flowers around one female flower. The fruit is a lobed, spherical capsule.

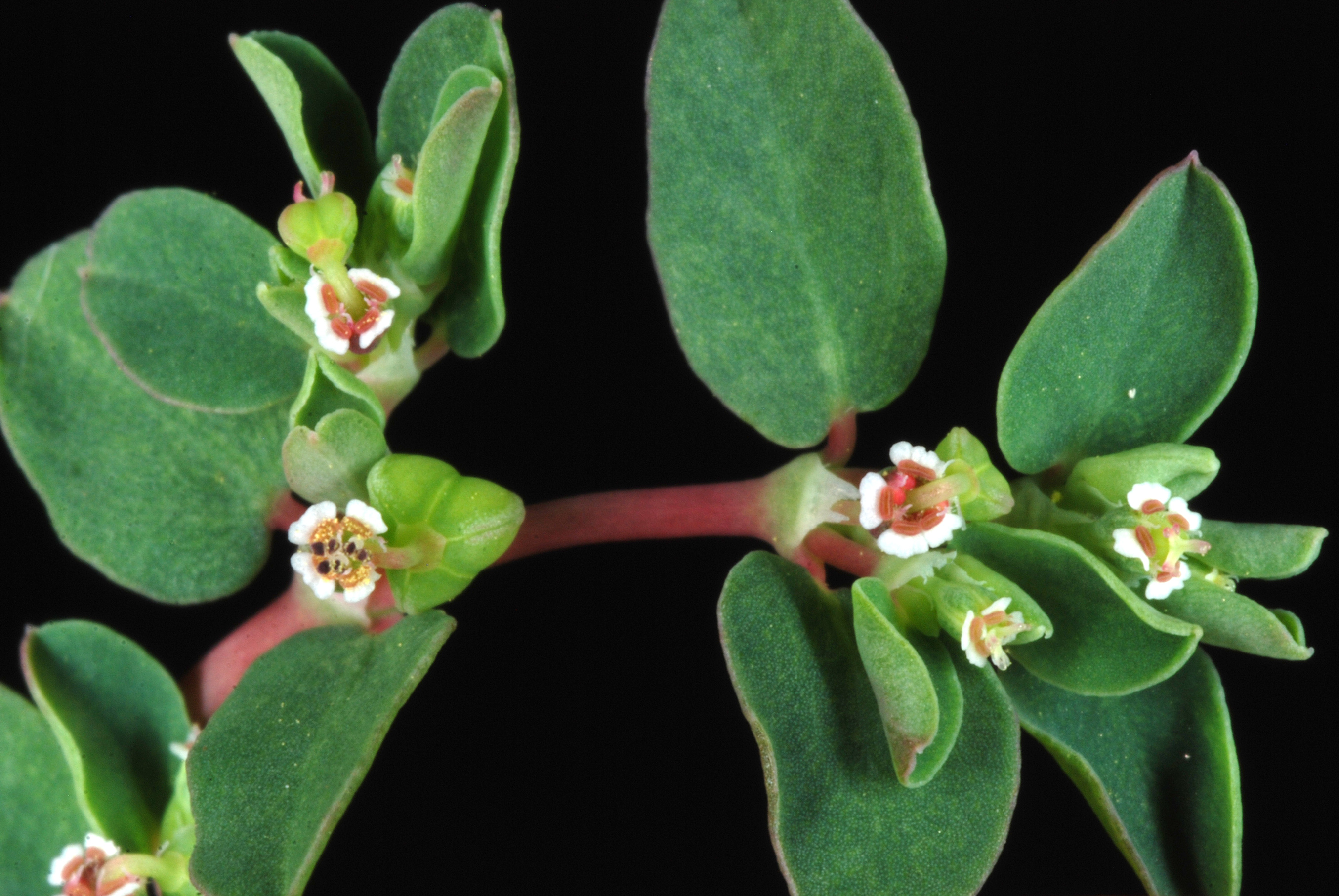
Flowers

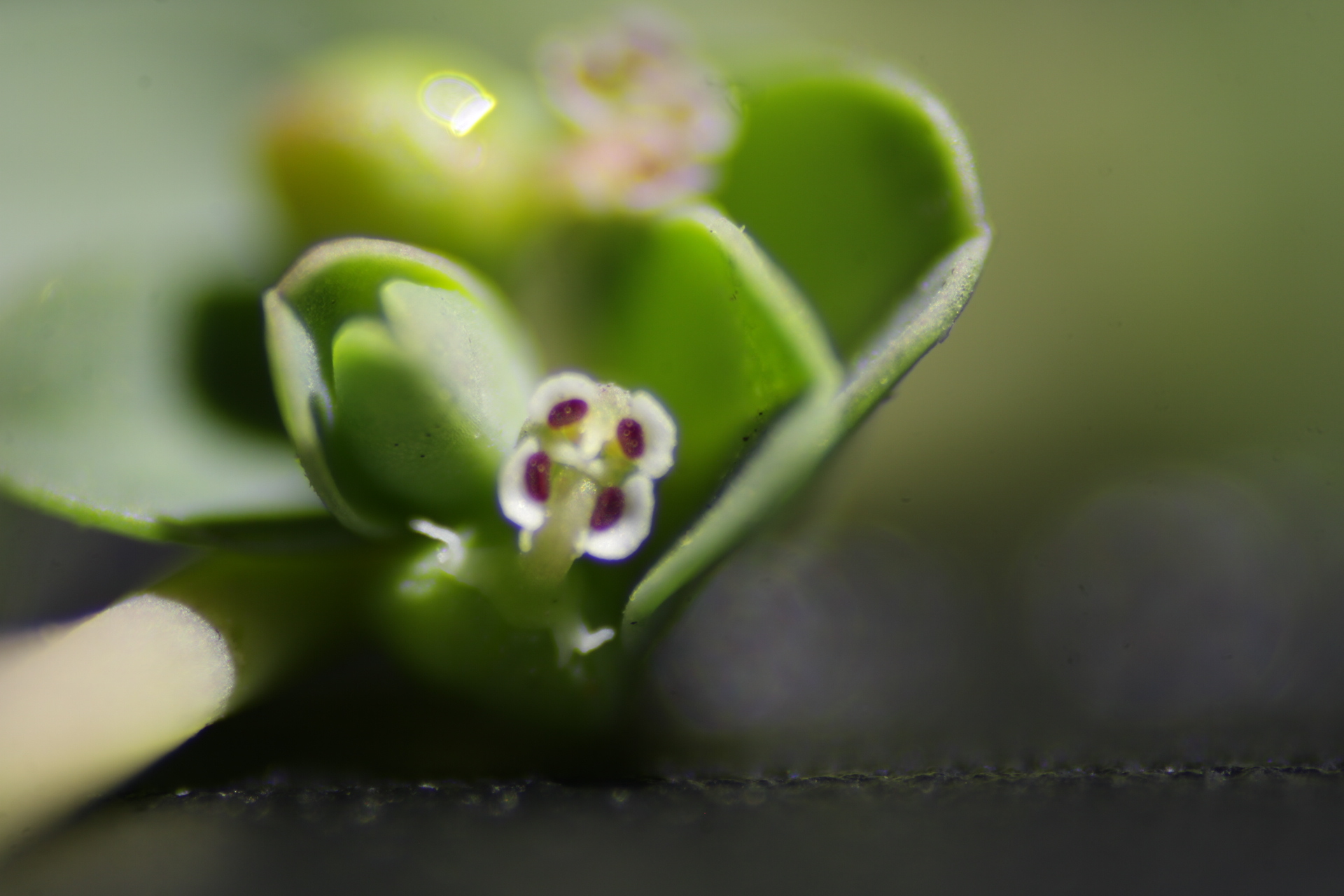
Macro view of a single flower

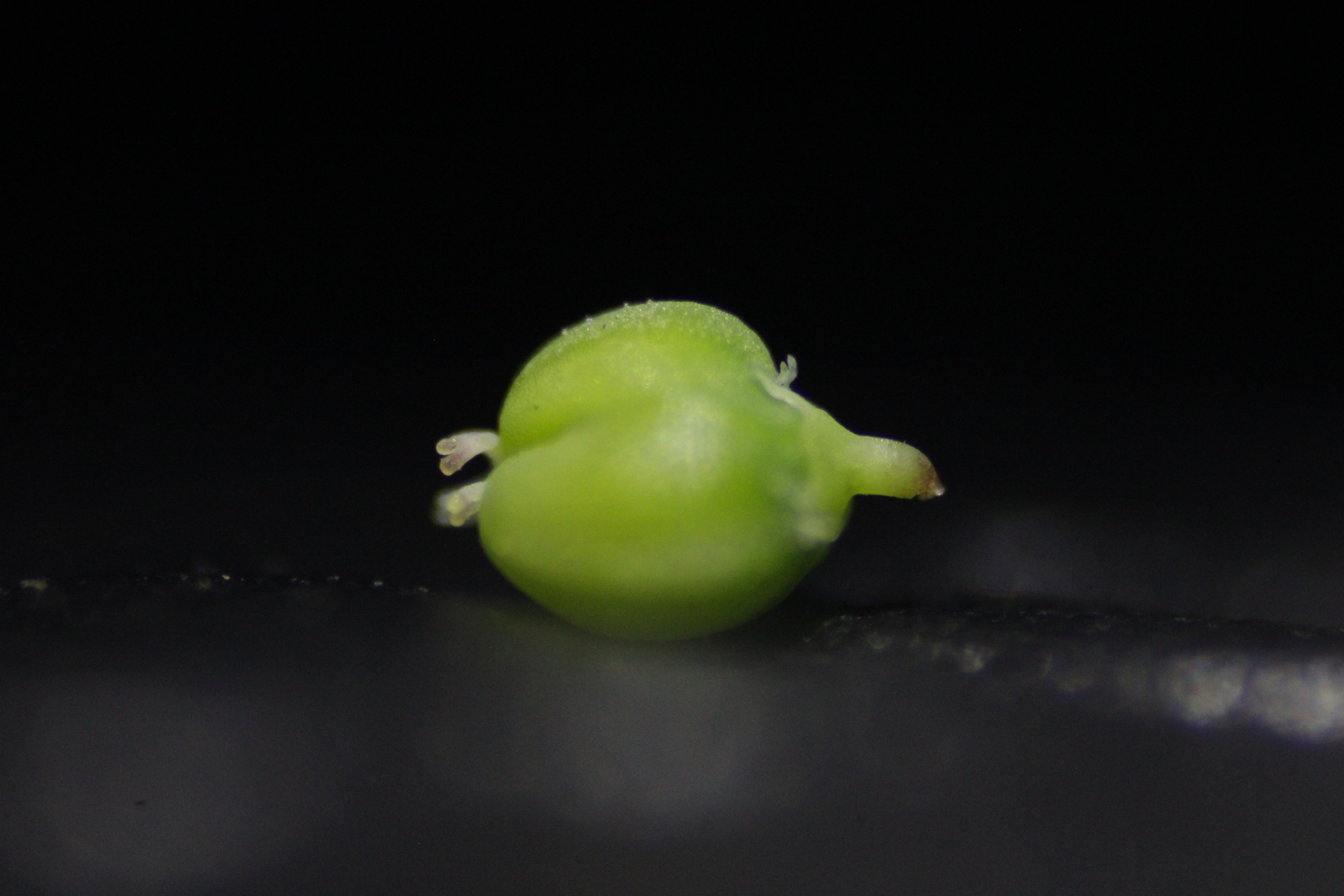
Macro view of a single fruit
