= Cyathium =

Form of inflorescence

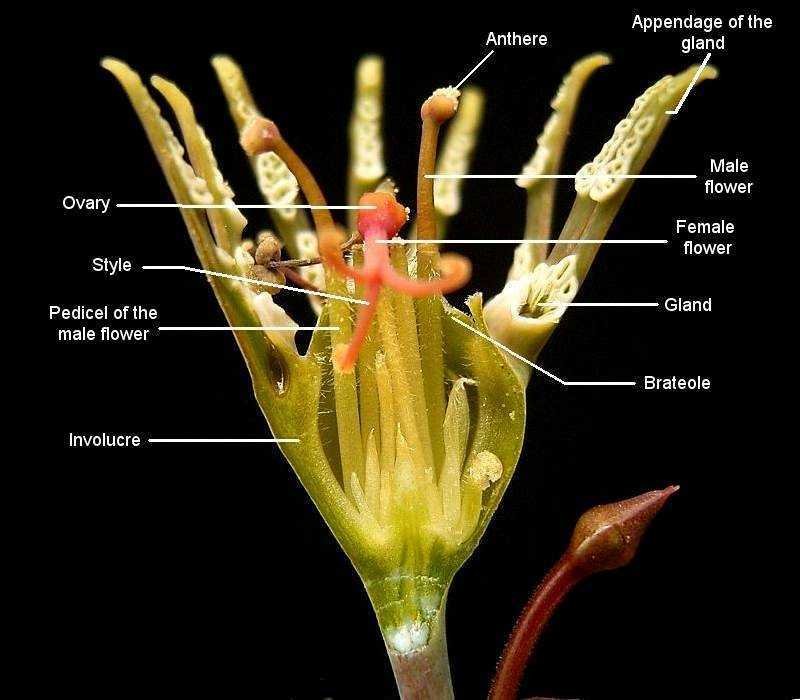
Euphorbia tridentata, cross-section of a cyathium, red stalked female flower extending toward the camera

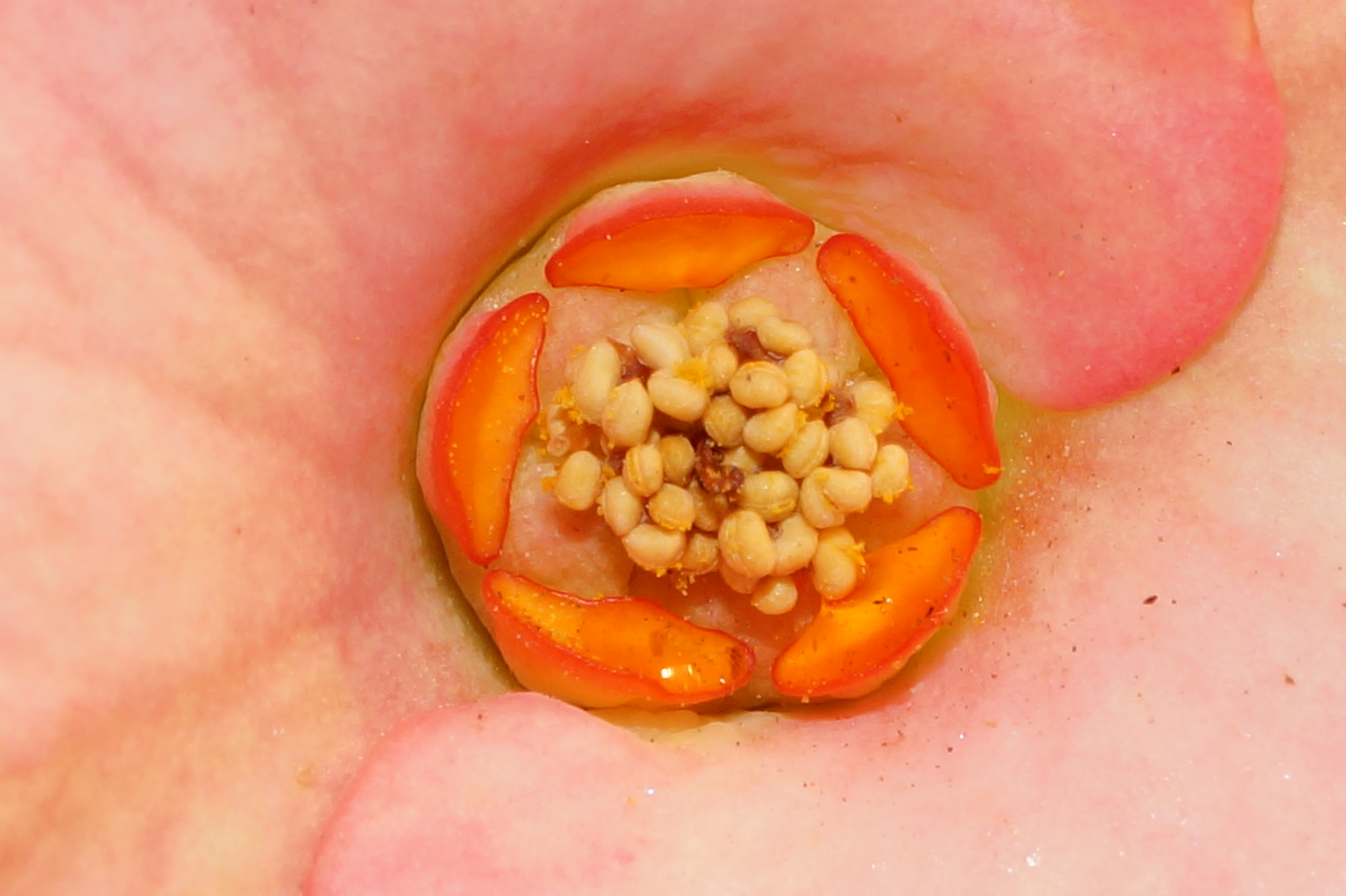
In Euphorbia milii—close up

A Cyathium (pl.: Cyathia) is one of the specialised pseudanthia ("false flowers") forming the inflorescence of plants in the genus Euphorbia (Euphorbiaceae). A cyathium consists of:

- Five (rarely four) bracteoles. These are small, united bracts, which form a cup-like involucre. Their upper tips are free and cover the opening of the involucre (like the shutter of a camera). These alternate with:
- Five (1 to 10) nectar glands, which are sometimes fused.
- One extremely reduced female flower standing in the centre on a stalk at the base of the involucre surrounded by:
- Four or five groups (one group at the base of each bracteole) of extremely reduced male flowers, which each consist of a single anther on a stem.

The flower-like characteristics of the cyathia are underlined by brightly coloured nectar glands and often by petal-like appendages to the nectar glands, or brightly coloured, petal-like bracts positioned under the cyathia. The paired petal-like bracts of Euphorbia section Goniostema are called cyathophylls. here female to male flower ratio is 1:α

The cyathia are sometimes solitary, but are usually in cymes, inflorescences of the second order, in pseudumbels, on dichotomously branched stalks or in so-called simple cymes which consist of one central and two lateral cyathia.

In one group of Madagascan species in the subfamily Euphorbia section Goniostema (E. aueoviridiflora, E. capmanambatoensis, E. iharanae, E. leuconeura, E. neohumbertii, E. viguieri) there is a tendency for a further pseudanthium to grow from the cyme. Probably as an adaptation to pollination by birds, the cyathia have become specialised: Most cyathia have upright cyathophylls which surround them protectively, but render the nectar glands inaccessible. To compensate, between them are naked sterile cyathia whose only job is to produce nectar.
