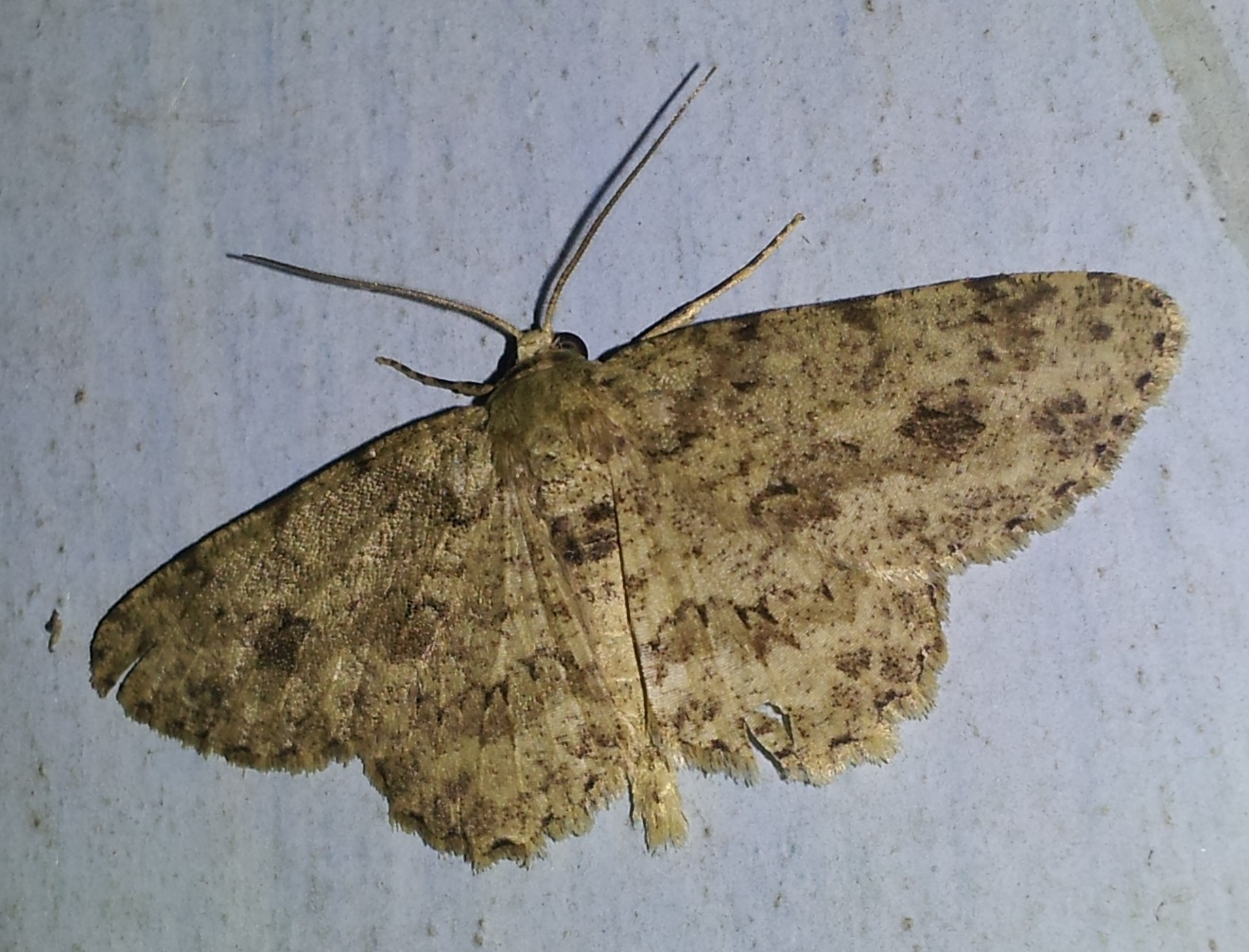

Scientific classification
- Kingdom: Animalia
- Phylum: Arthropoda
- Class: Insecta
- Order: Lepidoptera
- Family: Geometridae
- Genus: Ectropis
- Species: E. bhurmitra

Binomial name
- Ectropis bhurmitra (Walker, 1860)

Synonyms
- Boarmia bhurmitra Walker, 1860; Boarmia diffusaria Walker, 1860; Scioglyptis semifascia Warren, 1897; Ectropis sabulosa Warren, 1897; Heterostegane semifasciata Warren, 1900; Ectropis brevifasciata Wileman, 1912; Ectropis bhurmitra Walker; Sato, 1992

= Ectropis bhurmitra =

Species of moth

Ectropis bhurmitra, the tea twig caterpillar, is a moth of the family Geometridae. The species was first described by Francis Walker in 1860. A widespread Asian species, it is found around Indo-Australian tropics from India, Sri Lanka and Hong Kong, Taiwan, Thailand, New Guinea to Australian Queensland and the Solomon Islands.

== Description ==
The wingspan of the adult is 3 cm. Its ground colour is fawn with a brown fasciations with complex patterns. A blurry dark blotch is found near the middle of each forewing. The caterpillar has a dull, pale yellow dorsum and fuscous ventral side with pink suffusion. A rusty colour appears towards the posterior end. Setae arise from black dots. Pupation occurs within a silken cell woven between leaves.

== Biology ==
It is a polyphagous species. The caterpillar has been recorded from several plant species of many families. Host plants include Bombax ceiba, Terminalia, Artemisia vulgaris, Shorea, Aleurites, Phyllanthus, Albizia, Eucalyptus, Lantana camara, Sambucus, Uncaria gambir, Cassia, Indigofera, Leucaena, Allium, Eugenia, Syzygium, Champereia, Grevillea robusta, Breonia (syn. Anthocephalus), Coffea arabica, Elettaria cardamomum, Camellia sinensis, Gliricidia sepium, Citrus, Schleichera, Theobroma cacao, Taxodium, Gmelina, Vernicia montana and Tectona grandis.

Caterpillars feed on the epidermis of tender leaves causing holes on leaves. Mature caterpillars tend to feed leaves with small pieces started from margins and then eat the leaf entirely. They are mostly active during early morning and night.

== Control ==
It is a minor pest of tea. However, caterpillars can be removed by hand picking or other mechanical methods. Adults are attracted to light and pheromones. If the outbreak is heavy, insecticides such as trichlorfon, chlorfluazuron or tebufenozide can be applied to eradicate immature stages of the caterpillar. Using biological control, China has successfully experimented with viruses like nuclear polyhedrosis virus against larval stages.

== Research articles ==
- Studies on the ecology and causes of outbreak of Ectropis bhurmitra Wlk (Geometridae), the twig caterpillar of tea in Ceylon
- The chemical control of the twig caterpillar (Ectropis bhurmitra) in tea
- Final instar caterpillar and metamorphosis of Ectropis bhurmitra (Walker, 1860) in Singapore
- The ecology and control of the forest insects of India and the neighbouring countries
- Insect pest infestation on Gmelina arborea Roxb. in different agroclimatic zones of Jharkhand, India
