= Paul Hubertus Hiepko =

German botanist and journals editor (1932–2019)

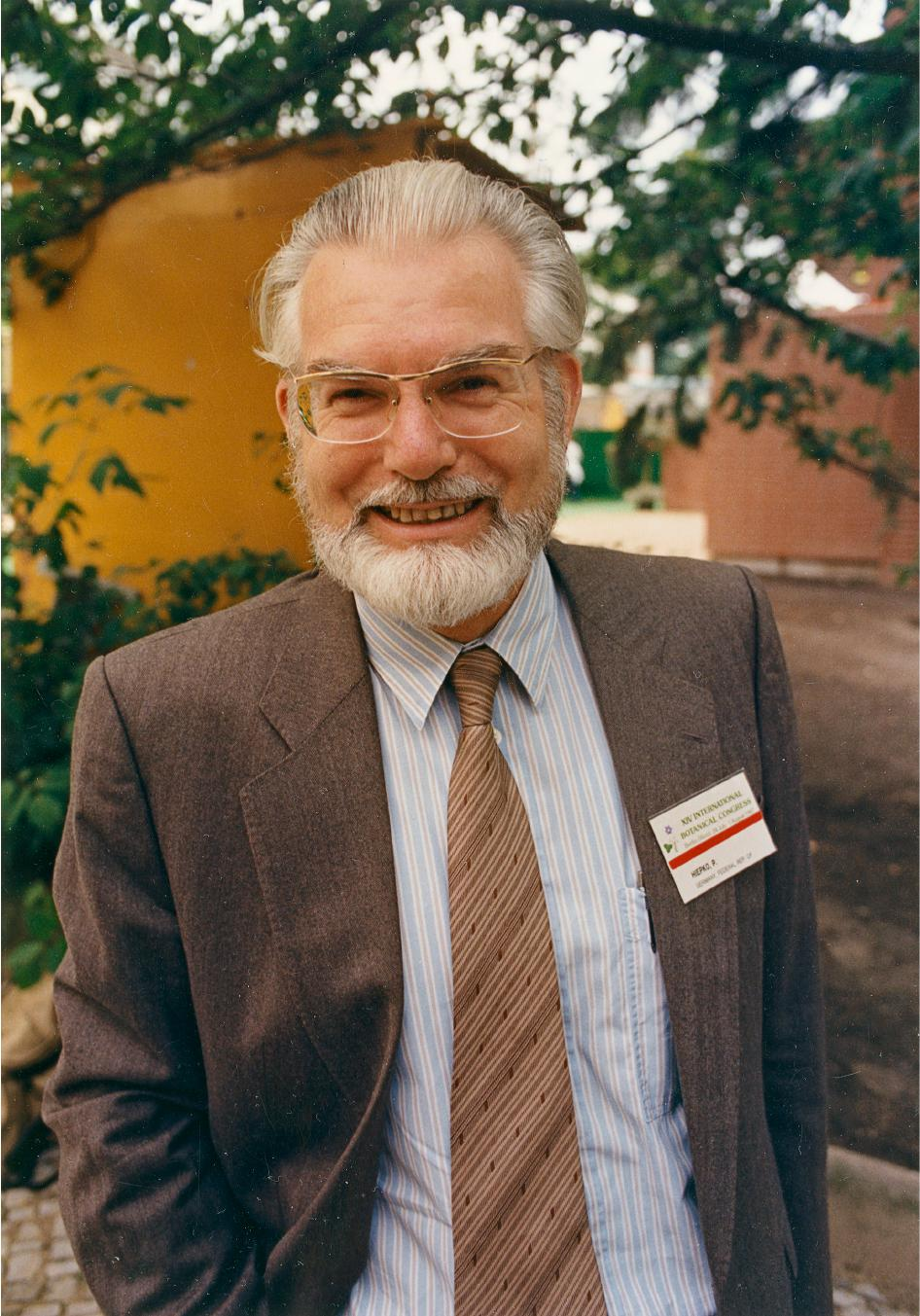

Paul Hubertus Hiepko (1932 – 2019) - was a German botanist and journals editor.

== Works ==
- Botanische Jahrbücher für Systematik, Pflanzengeschichte und Pflanzengeographie [Vol. 104 (1983) – vol. 125 (2004)].
- Hiepko P. 1984. Opiliaceae. In: van Steenis CGGJ ed. Flora Malesiana. London: Martinus Nijhoff Garden. 31–52.
- Hiepko P. 1987. A revision of Opiliaceae, IV. Rhopalopilia Pierre and Pentarhopalopilia (Engler) Hiepko gen. nov. Botanische Jahrbücher für Systematik, Pflanzengeschichte und Pflanzengeographie 108: 280–288.
- Hiepko P. 2008. Opiliaceae. In: Anderson CE, Marhold K eds. Species Plantarum: Flora of the World. Geneve: Conservatoire et Jardin botaniques de la Ville de Geneve. 12: 1–7
- Hiepko, P. 1997. A new name and a new combination in the neotropical genus Agonandra (Opiliaceae). Willdenowia 27(1/2): 225–226
- Delprete, P.G., Schuster, T.M. and Hiepko, P. (2005). An annotated translation of Karl Schumann’s 1888 Ueber einige verkannte oder wenig gekannte Geschlechter der Rubiaceen Suedamericas" with notes on the Rubiaceae type specimens kept at Berlin Herbarium. Botanische Jahrbücher für Systematik, Pflanzengeschichte und Pflanzengeographie 126, 3-69
