= Agonandra macrocarpa =

Conservation status
- Near Threatened (IUCN 3.1)

Scientific classification
- Kingdom: Plantae
- Clade: Tracheophytes
- Clade: Angiosperms
- Clade: Eudicots
- Order: Santalales
- Family: Opiliaceae
- Genus: Agonandra
- Species: A. macrocarpa

Binomial name
- Agonandra macrocarpa L.O. Wms.

Synonyms
- Agonandra loranthoides L.O.Williams

Species of flowering plant

Agonandra macrocarpa is a species of plant in the family Opiliaceae. It is found in Costa Rica and Honduras. It is threatened by habitat loss.
