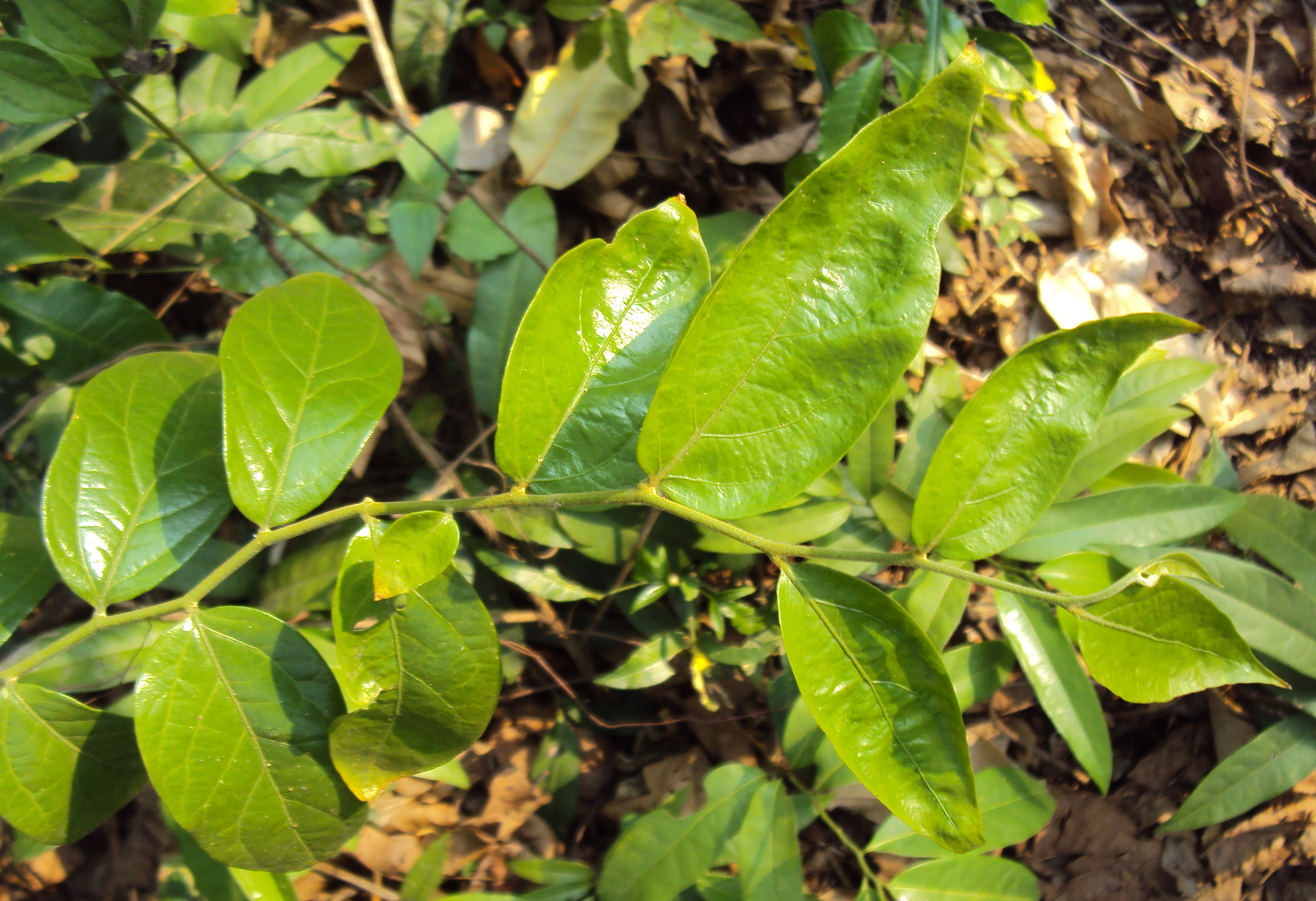

Scientific classification
- Kingdom: Plantae
- Clade: Tracheophytes
- Clade: Angiosperms
- Clade: Eudicots
- Order: Santalales
- Family: Opiliaceae
- Genus: Cansjera
- Species: C. rheedei

Binomial name
- Cansjera rheedei J.F.Gmel.

= Cansjera rheedei =

Species of flowering plant

Cansjera rheedei is a scandent shrub distributed from India, across Southeast Asia, China, Sumatra, Borneo and the Philippines. It was described by Johann Friedrich Gmelin in his work System Naturae ed. 13[bis]: 280 (1791).
