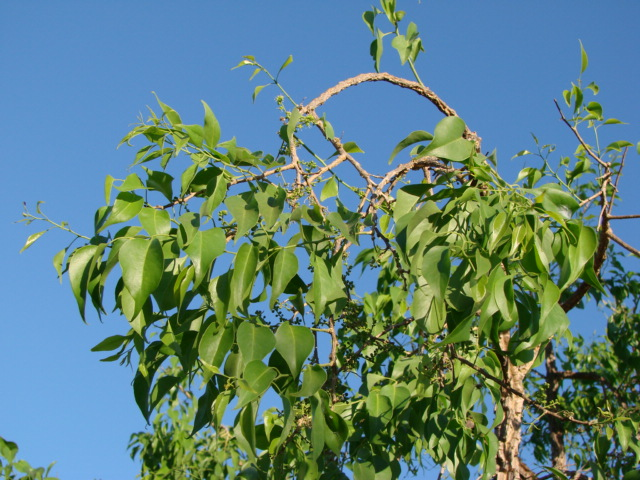

Scientific classification
- Kingdom: Plantae
- Clade: Tracheophytes
- Clade: Angiosperms
- Clade: Eudicots
- Order: Santalales
- Family: Opiliaceae
- Genus: Agonandra
- Species: A. brasiliensis

Binomial name
- Agonandra brasiliensis Miers ex Benth. & Hook.f.

= Agonandra brasiliensis =

Species of tree

Agonandra brasiliensis (Portuguese common name: pau-marfim) is a timber tree native to Amazon rainforest and Cerrado vegetation in Brazil. This plant is Brazilian wood export, and it is often used for flooring and furniture, specially chair production.
