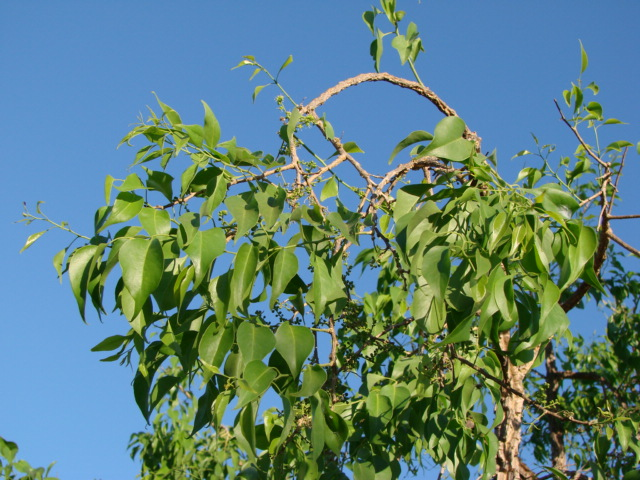
- Agonandra brasiliensis

Scientific classification
- Kingdom: Plantae
- Clade: Tracheophytes
- Clade: Angiosperms
- Clade: Eudicots
- Order: Santalales
- Family: Opiliaceae
- Genus: Agonandra; Miers ex Benth. & Hook.f.

= Agonandra =

Genus of flowering plants

Agonandra is a genus of plants in the family Opiliaceae described as a genus in 1862.

Agonandra is native to Mesoamerica and South America.

Species

1. Agonandra brasiliensis - Panama, Colombia, Venezuela, Guyana, Brazil, Bolivia, Peru, Paraguay
2. Agonandra excelsa - Brazil, Bolivia, Peru, Paraguay, Ecuador, N Argentina
3. Agonandra fluminensis - Rio de Janeiro
4. Agonandra goldbergiana - Guatemala
5. Agonandra macrocarpa - Yucatán, Costa Rica, Honduras, Nicaragua
6. Agonandra obtusifolia - C + S Mexico
7. Agonandra ovatifolia - Chiapas
8. Agonandra peruviana - E Ecuador, N Peru, NW Brazil
9. Agonandra racemosa - C + S Mexico, Guatemala, El Salvador, Honduras
10. Agonandra silvatica - Fr Guiana, Suriname, Guyana, Venezuela, N Brazil, Bolivia, Peru, Ecuador
