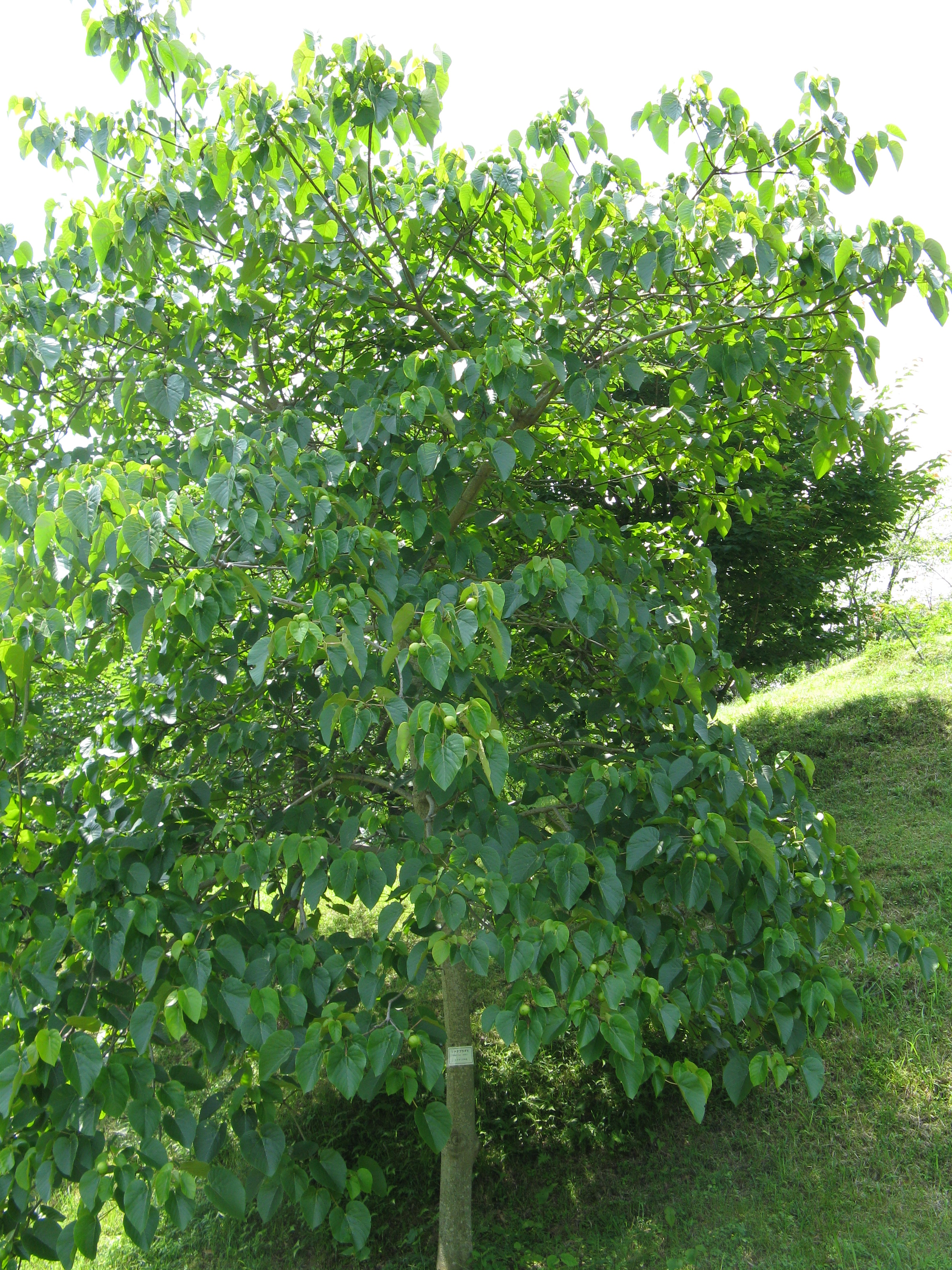
- Vernicia fordii

Scientific classification
- Kingdom: Plantae
- Clade: Tracheophytes
- Clade: Angiosperms
- Clade: Eudicots
- Clade: Rosids
- Order: Malpighiales
- Family: Euphorbiaceae
- Subfamily: Crotonoideae
- Tribe: Aleuritideae
- Subtribe: Aleuritinae
- Genus: Vernicia; Lour.

Synonyms
- Dryandra Thunb. 1783, rejected name, not R.Br. 1810; Elaeococca Comm. ex A.Juss.

= Vernicia =

Genus of flowering plants

Vernicia is a genus in the spurge family Euphorbiaceae, first described as a genus in 1790. It is native to China, Japan, India, and Indochina. The species have often been included within the related genus Aleurites.

They are shrubs or trees growing to 20 m tall. The leaves are alternate, broad, and entire to palmately lobed; they may be either deciduous or evergreen. The flowers may be either monoecious or dioecious.

== Species ==
Image	Fruit	Scientific name	Distribution
		Vernicia cordata (Thunb.) Airy Shaw.	southern Japan, naturalized in Angola and Nepal
		Vernicia fordii (Hemsl.) Airy Shaw.	southern China, Myanmar, Vietnam, naturalized in Mozambique, Zimbabwe, Taiwan, eastern Himalayas, New South Wales, California, Lesser Antilles, Paraguay, Argentina (tung oil tree)
		Vernicia montana Lour.	southern China, Indochina; naturalized in Angola, Japan, Java, eastern Himalayas (mu oil tree)
