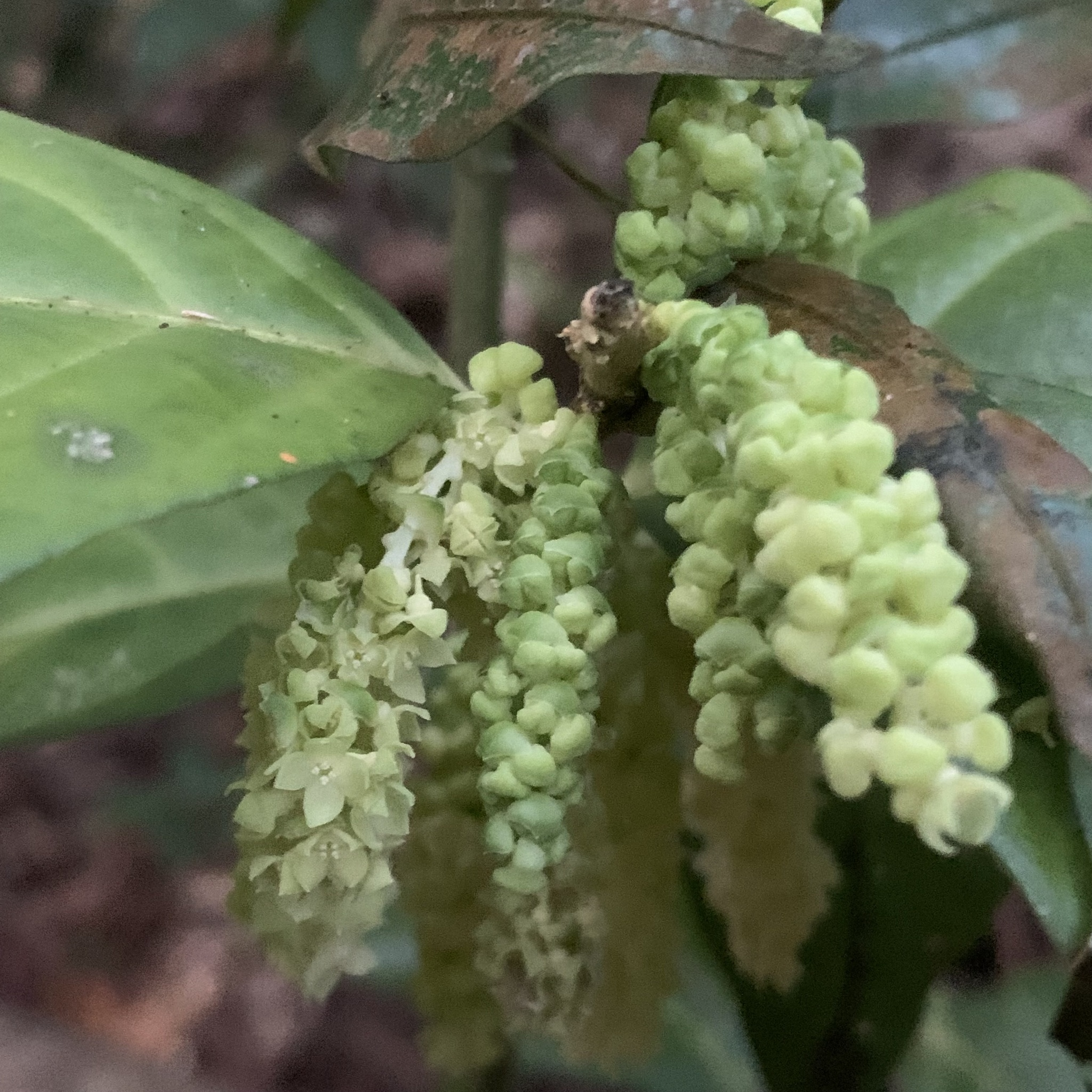
- Lepionurus sylvestris in Singapore

Scientific classification
- Kingdom: Plantae
- Clade: Embryophytes
- Clade: Tracheophytes
- Clade: Spermatophytes
- Clade: Angiosperms
- Clade: Eudicots
- Order: Santalales
- Family: Opiliaceae
- Genus: Lepionurus; Blume
- Species: L. sylvestris

Binomial name
- Lepionurus sylvestris Blume

Synonyms
- Lepionurus javanicus G.Don; Opilia acuminata Wall. ex Baill.; Leptonium oblongifolium Griff.; Lepionurus oblongifolius (Griff.) Mast.; Lepionurus sylvestris var. lanceolatus Valeton; Lepionurus oblongifolius var. angustifolius Ridl.

= Lepionurus =

Genus of flowering plants

Lepionurus is a genus of plants in the family Opiliaceae described as a genus in 1826.

It contains only one known species, Lepionurus sylvestris, native to Yunnan, Bhutan, Assam, W Indonesia, Laos, Malaysia, Myanmar, Nepal, Sikkim, Thailand, Vietnam.
