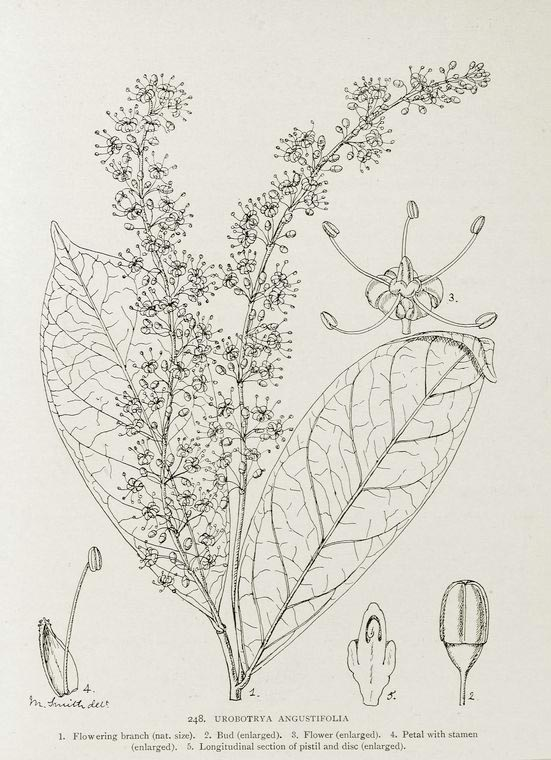
- Urobotrya congolana subsp. afzelii

Scientific classification
- Kingdom: Plantae
- Clade: Tracheophytes
- Clade: Angiosperms
- Clade: Eudicots
- Order: Santalales
- Family: Opiliaceae
- Genus: Urobotrya; Stapf

= Urobotrya =

Genus of flowering plants

Urobotrya is a genus of plants in the family Opiliaceae described as a genus in 1905.

Urobotrya is native to Africa and Southeast Asia.

Species

1. Urobotrya congolana (Baill.) Hiepko - W + C Africa
2. Urobotrya floresensis Hiepko - Flores
3. Urobotrya latisquama (Gagnep.) Hiepko - Guangxi, Yunnan, Laos, Myanmar, Thailand, Vietnam
4. Urobotrya longipes (Gagnep.) Hiepko - Vietnam
5. Urobotrya parviflora Hiepko - Borneo
6. Urobotrya siamensis Hiepko - Indochina
7. Urobotrya sparsiflora (Engl.) Hiepko - Central African Rep., West Congo, East Congo, Angola
