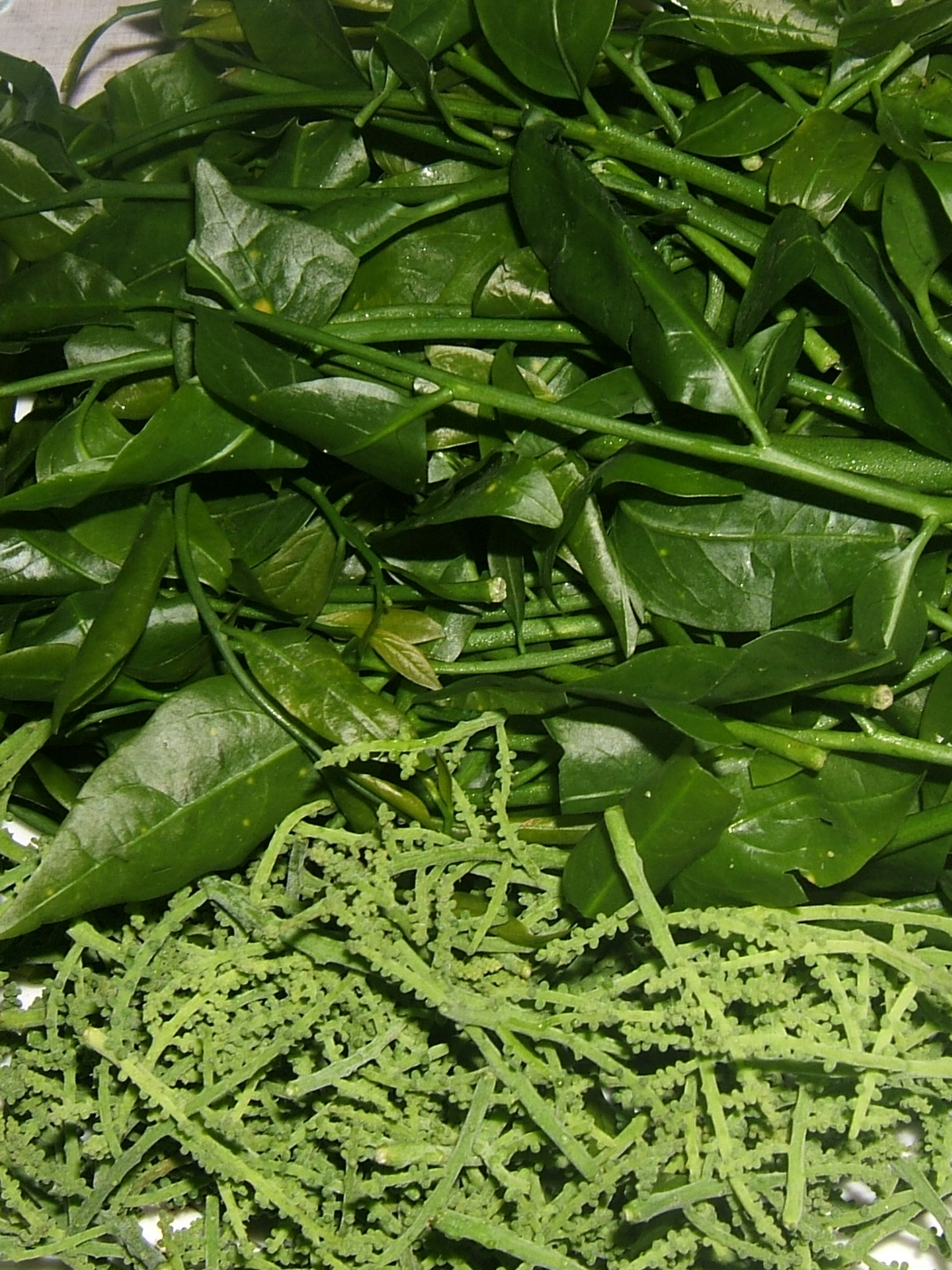
- Melientha suavis (leaves and flowers)

Scientific classification
- Kingdom: Plantae
- Clade: Tracheophytes
- Clade: Angiosperms
- Clade: Eudicots
- Order: Santalales
- Family: Opiliaceae
- Genus: Melientha; Pierre
- Species: M. suavis

Binomial name
- Melientha suavis Pierre

Synonyms
- Melientha acuminata Merr.

= Melientha =

Genus of flowering plants

== Descriptions ==
Melientha is a genus of plants in the family Opiliaceae described as a genus in 1888.

The genus contains only one known species, Melientha suavis, native to Southeast Asia (Mindanao, Sabah, Peninsular Malaysia, Thailand, Cambodia, Laos, Vietnam).

Varieties

1. Melientha suavis subsp. macrocarpa Hiepko - Sabah
2. Melientha suavis subsp. suavis - Mindanao, Peninsular Malaysia, Thailand, Cambodia, Laos, Vietnam

== Uses ==
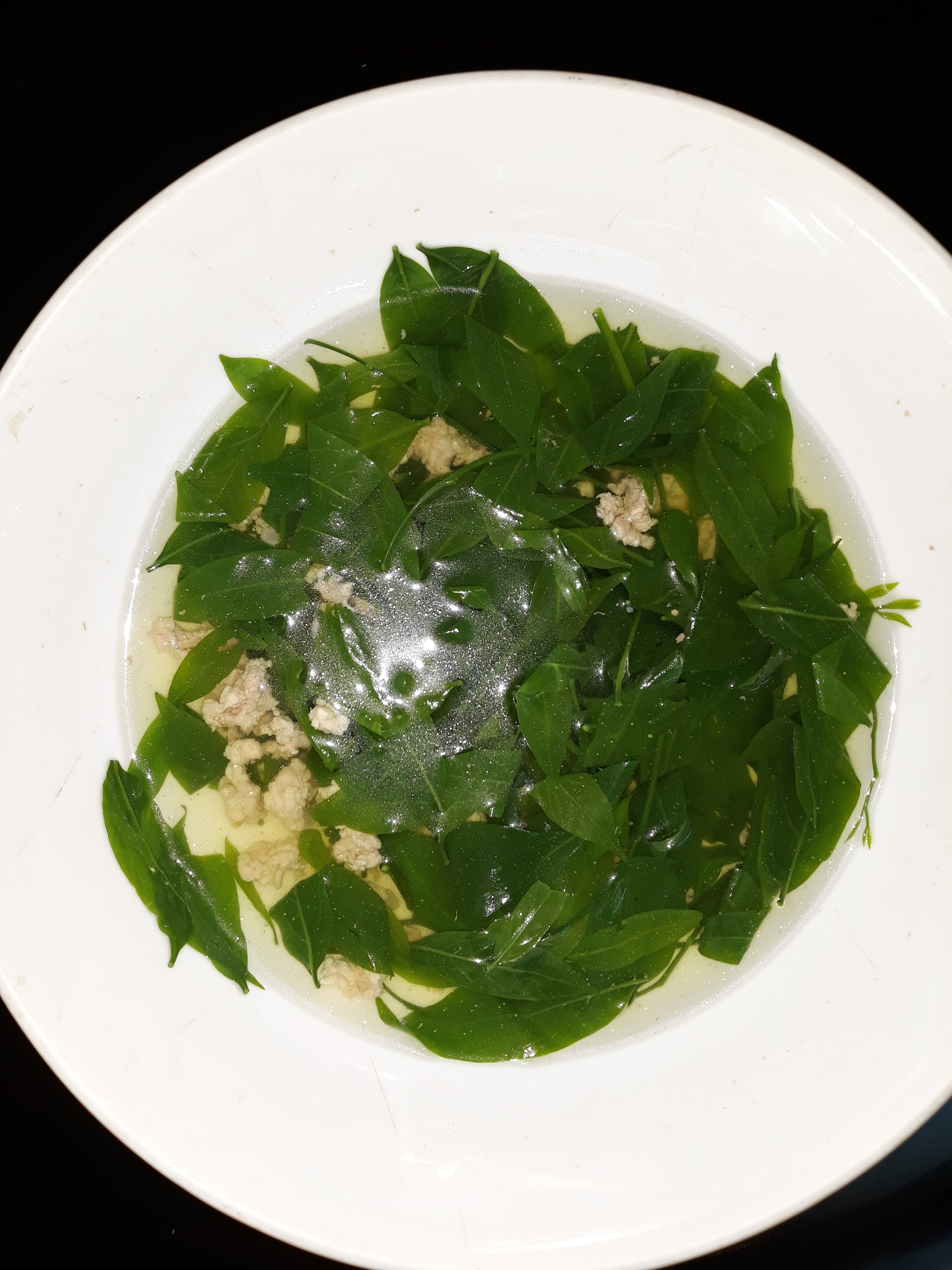
Vietnamese Milentha soup

In Vietnam, the plant is called Rau Sắng. It is considered a food delicacy. In Thailand the plant is known as ผักหวานป่า (/phak waan paa/). Its leaves are considered a food delicacy.
