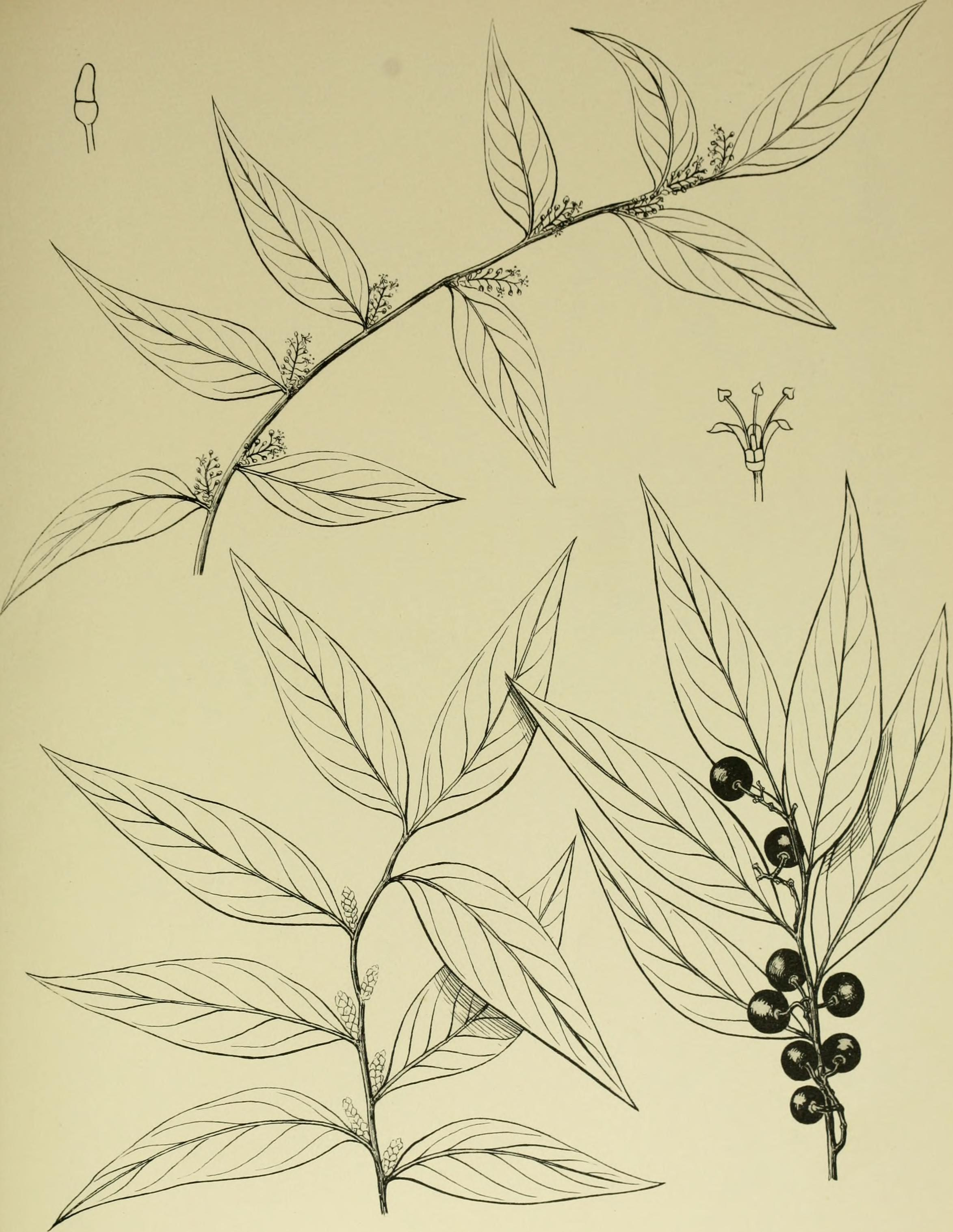
- Gjellerupia papuana Lauterb.

Scientific classification
- Kingdom: Plantae
- Clade: Tracheophytes
- Clade: Angiosperms
- Clade: Eudicots
- Order: Santalales
- Family: Opiliaceae
- Genus: Gjellerupia; Lauterb.
- Species: G. papuana

Binomial name
- Gjellerupia papuana Lauterb.

= Gjellerupia =

Genus of flowering plants

Gjellerupia is a genus of plants in the family Opiliaceae described as a genus in 1912.

It contains only one known species, Gjellerupia papuana, endemic to New Guinea.
