= Cansjera =

Scientific classification
- Kingdom: Plantae
- Clade: Tracheophytes
- Clade: Angiosperms
- Clade: Eudicots
- Order: Santalales
- Family: Opiliaceae
- Genus: Cansjera; Juss. 1789, conserved name

Synonyms
- Tsjeru-caniram Adans. 1763, rejected name

Genus of flowering plants

Cansjera is a genus of plants in the family Opiliaceae described as a genus with this name in 1789.

Cansjera is native to southern China, Indian subcontinent, Southeast Asia, Papuasia, and northern Australia.

Species

1. Cansjera leptostachya - Java, Lesser Sunda Is, Maluku, New Guinea, Solomons, Bismarck, N Australia (NT Qld WA)
2. Cansjera parvifolia - Myanmar
3. Cansjera rheedei - India, Sri Lanka, Nepal, China (Guangdong, Guangxi, Hainan, Yunnan), Andaman & Nicobar, Indochina, P Malaysia, Borneo, Sumatra, Philippines
