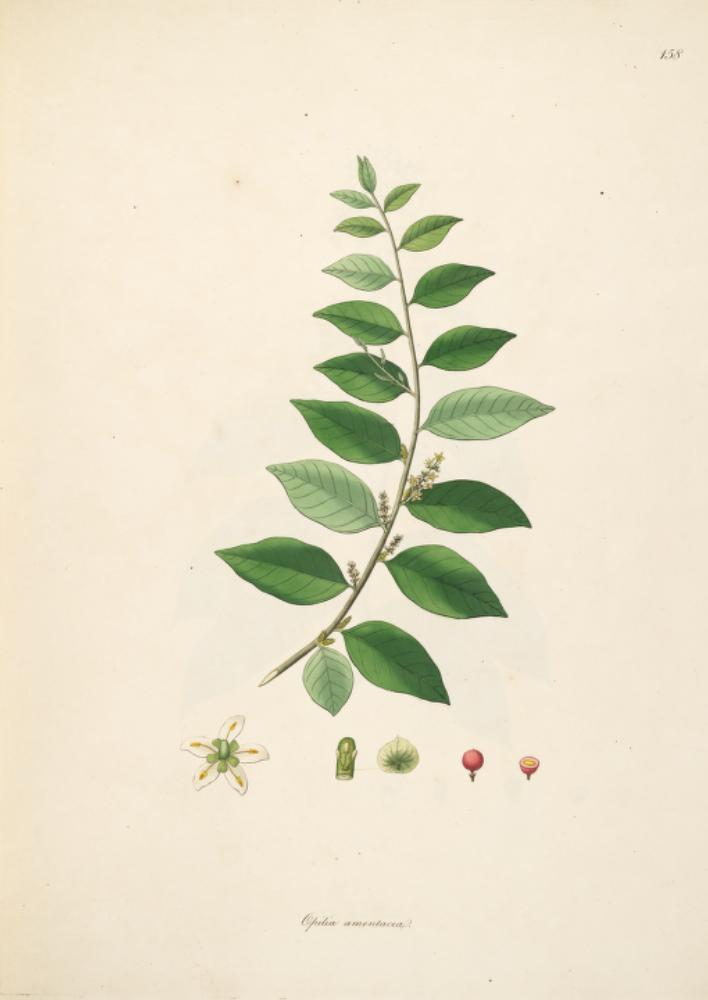
- Opilia amentacea

Scientific classification
- Kingdom: Plantae
- Clade: Tracheophytes
- Clade: Angiosperms
- Clade: Eudicots
- Order: Santalales
- Family: Opiliaceae
- Genus: Opilia; Roxb.

Synonyms
- Tetanosia Rich. ex M.Roem.; Pentitdis Zipp. ex Blume

= Opilia =

Genus of flowering plants

Opilia is a genus of approximately 33 species of lianas in the family Opiliaceae described as a genus in 1802.

Opilia is native to tropical and subtropical regions of Asia, Africa, Papuasia, and Australia.

Species

- Opilia afzelii - Sierra Leone
- Opilia amentacea - trop Africa, Madagascar, India, Sri Lanka, Yunnan, SE Asia, Papuasia, N Australia
- Opilia campestris - Ethiopia, Somalia, Kenya, Tanzania, Angola, Namibia
- Opilia congolana - Cameroon, Gabon, Equatorial Guinea, Democratic Republic of the Congo
- Opilia fragrans - Philippines
