= Pentarhopalopilia =

Scientific classification
- Kingdom: Plantae
- Clade: Tracheophytes
- Clade: Angiosperms
- Clade: Eudicots
- Order: Santalales
- Family: Opiliaceae
- Genus: Pentarhopalopilia (Engl.) Hiepko

Synonyms
- Rhopalopilia section Pentarhopalopilia Engl. 1909

Genus of flowering plants

Pentarhopalopilia is a genus of plants in the family Opiliaceae described as a genus in 1987.

Pentarhopalopilia is native to Africa and Madagascar.

Species

- Pentarhopalopilia madagascariensis (Cavaco & Keraudren) Hiepko - Madagascar
- Pentarhopalopilia marquesii (Engl.) Hiepko - Cabinda, West Congo, East Congo, Zambia, Angola
- Pentarhopalopilia perrieri (Cavaco & Keraudren) Hiepko - Madagascar
- Pentarhopalopilia umbellulata (Baill.) Hiepko - Kenya, Tanzania, Mozambique
