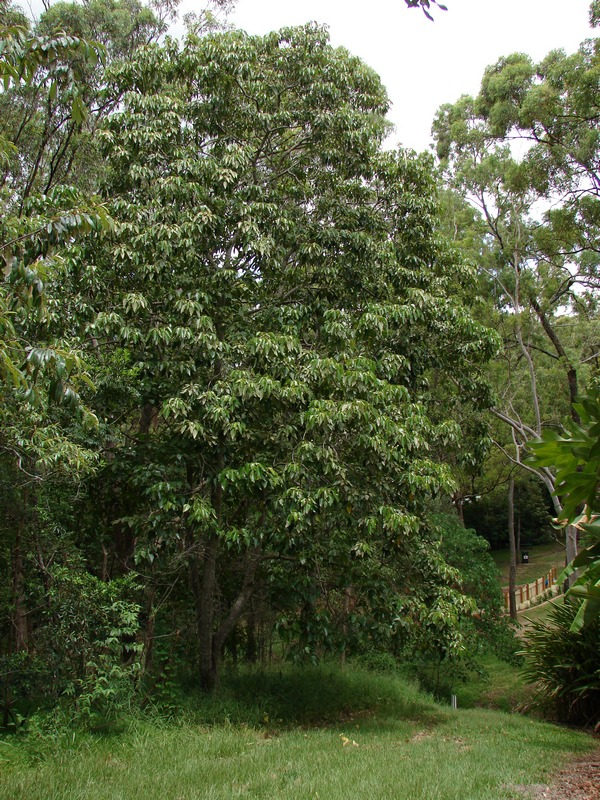

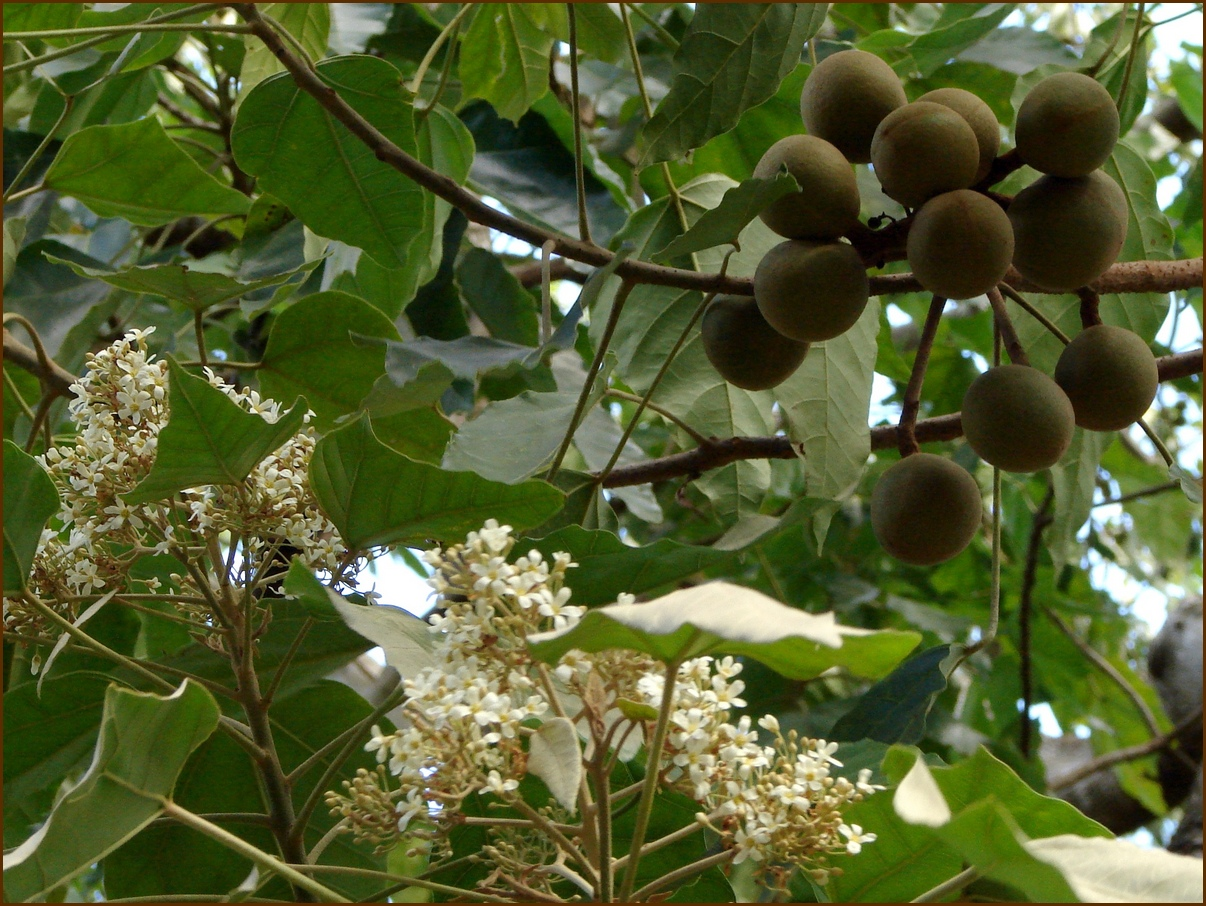
- A. rockinghamensis flowers and fruit

Scientific classification
- Kingdom: Plantae
- Clade: Tracheophytes
- Clade: Angiosperms
- Clade: Eudicots
- Clade: Rosids
- Order: Malpighiales
- Family: Euphorbiaceae
- Genus: Aleurites
- Species: A. rockinghamensis

Binomial name
- Aleurites rockinghamensis (Baill.) P.I.Forst.

= Aleurites rockinghamensis =

Candlenut

Species of flowering plant

Aleurites rockinghamensis, the candlenut, is a flowering tree in the spurge family, Euphorbiaceae found in northeastern Australia. It was first formally described and named by French botanist Henri Ernest Baillon as a variety of Aleurites moluccanus, as Aleurites moluccanus var. rockinghamensis in 1866. The Australian botanist Paul Irwin Forster promoted it to distinct species status in 1996. The type specimen was collected in Rockingham Bay, Queensland. It occurs in Australia and Papua New Guinea.
