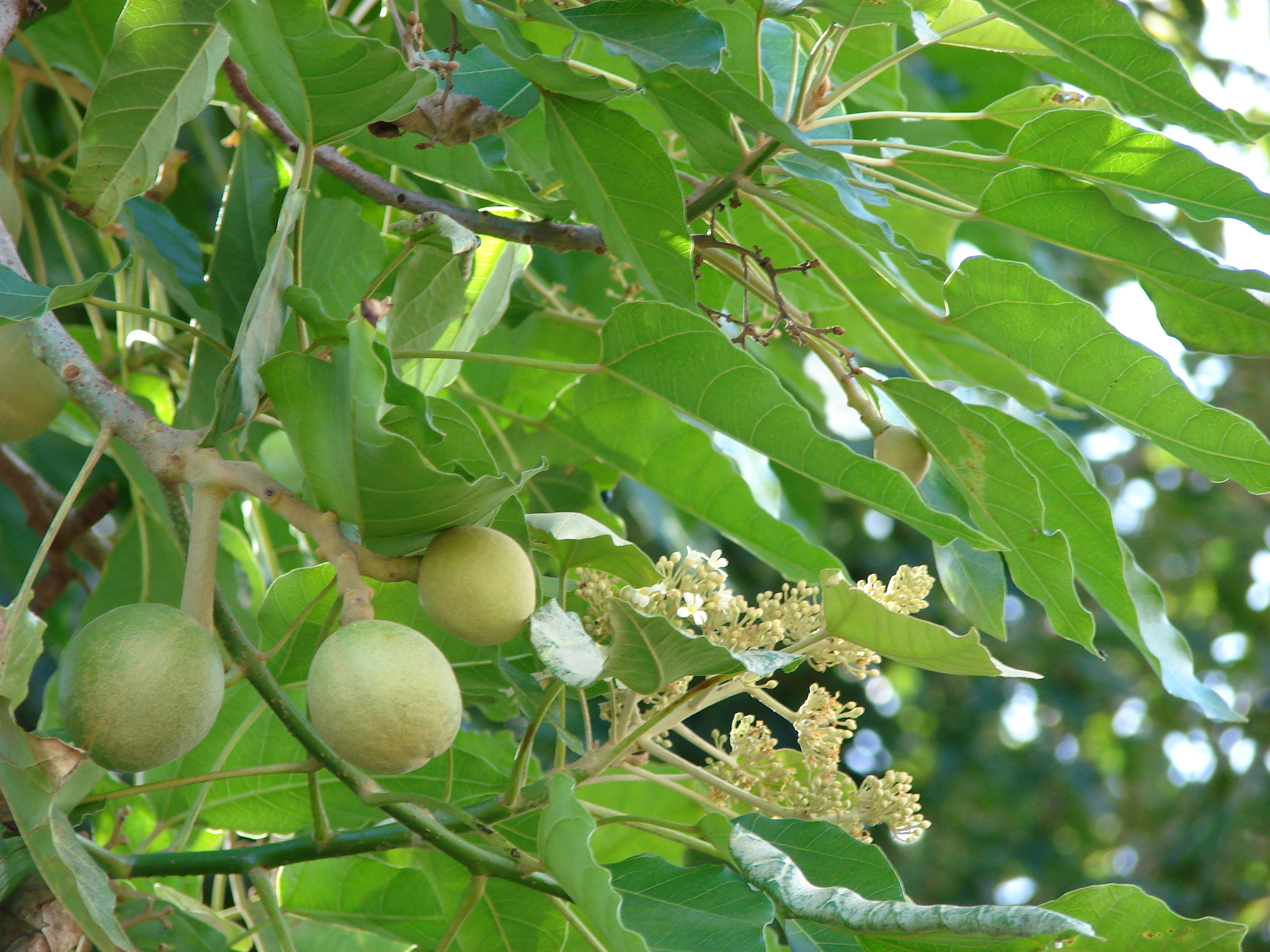
- Candlenut (A. moluccanus)

Scientific classification
- Kingdom: Plantae
- Clade: Tracheophytes
- Clade: Angiosperms
- Clade: Eudicots
- Clade: Rosids
- Order: Malpighiales
- Family: Euphorbiaceae
- Subfamily: Crotonoideae
- Tribe: Aleuritideae
- Subtribe: Aleuritinae
- Genus: Aleurites; J.R.Forst. & G.Forst.

Synonyms
- Camirium Gaertn.; Ambinax Comm. ex A.Juss.; Telopea Sol. ex Baill.

= Aleurites =

Genus of flowering plants

Aleurites is a small genus of arborescent flowering plants in the Euphorbiaceae, first described as a genus in 1776. It is native to China, the Indian subcontinent, Southeast Asia, Papuasia, and Queensland. It is also reportedly naturalized on various islands (Pacific and Indian Oceans, plus the Caribbean) as well as scattered locations in Africa, South America, and Florida.

These monoecious, evergreen trees are perennials or semiperennials. These are large trees, 15–40 m (49–131 ft) tall, with spreading, drooping, and rising branches.

The leaves are alternate, lobate, ovate to ovate-lanceolate with minute stipules. They are pubescent on both sides when young, but in a later stage they become glabrous.

The inflorescence consists of terminal plumes of small, creamy white, bell-shaped, fragrant flowers, branching from the base. The flowers are usually bisexual, with a solitary pistillate flower at the end of each major axis. The lateral cymes are staminate. There are five or six imbricate petals. The staminate flowers are mostly longer and thinner than the pistillate flowers, with 17–32 glabrous stamens in four whorls. The pistillate flowers have a superior ovary.

The fruits are rather large drupes with a fleshy exocarp and a thin, woody endocarp. They vary in shape, according to the numbers of developed locules. They contain oleiferous, poisonous seeds.

The oil has been used as a paraffin and lubricant, and as a constituent of varnish, paint, and soap. Once poisonous substances are removed, it can be used as a cooking oil.

Some deciduous Chinese species are now classified under a separate genus Vernicia.

The name Aleurites is derived from the Ancient Greek: ἄλευρον meaning "wheaten flour" or "ground meal", because of the appearance of the lower surface of the leaf.

== Taxonomy and nomenclature ==
Linnaeus assigned the Latin feminine grammatical gender to the genus name Aleurites, as for example in the species name Aleurites moluccana. The current International Code of Nomenclature for algae, fungi, and plants has standardized all genus names ending in -ites to use the masculine gender, so the correct name of the species Aleurites moluccanus.

== Species ==
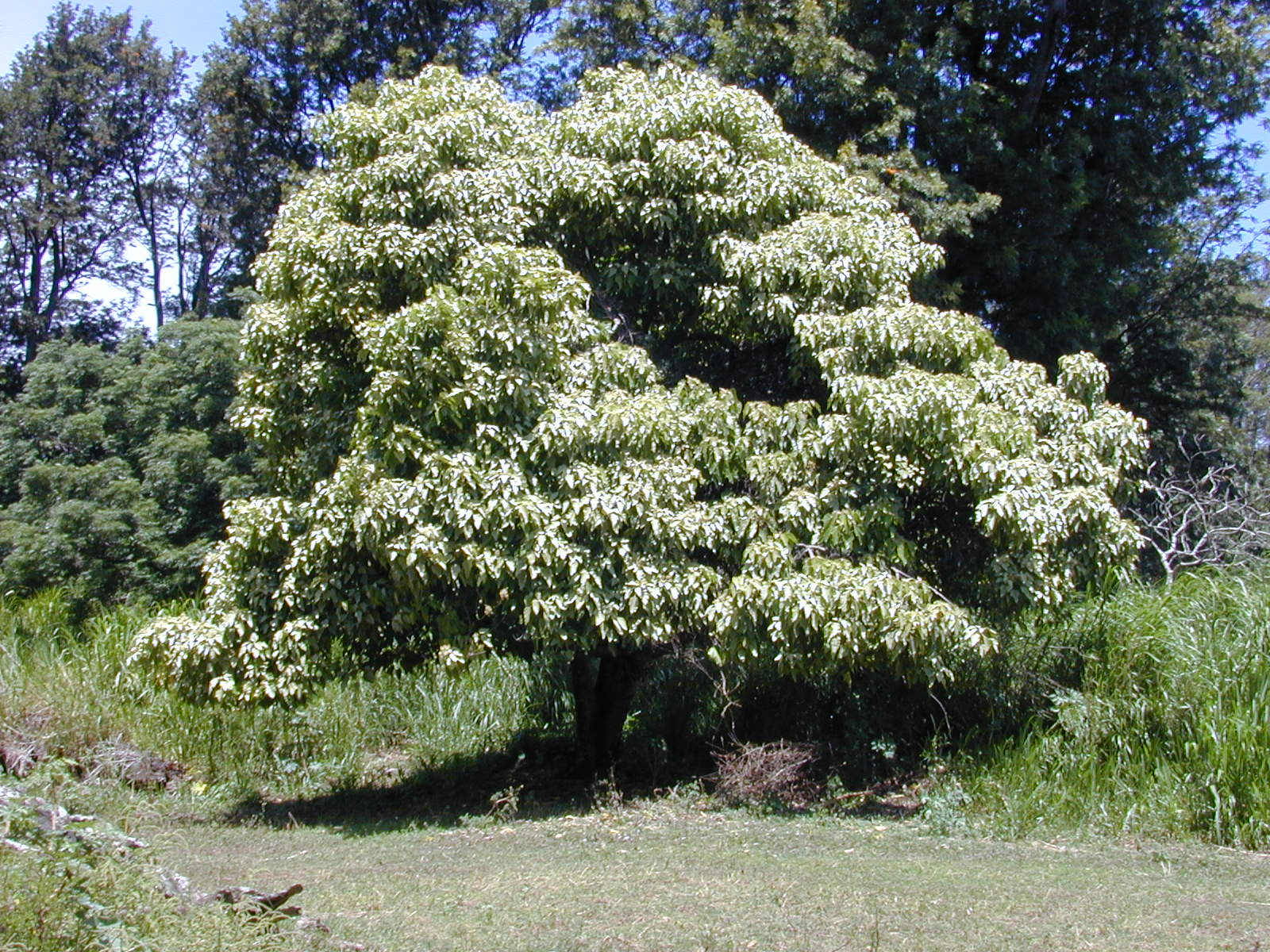
Candlenut (Aleurites moluccanus)

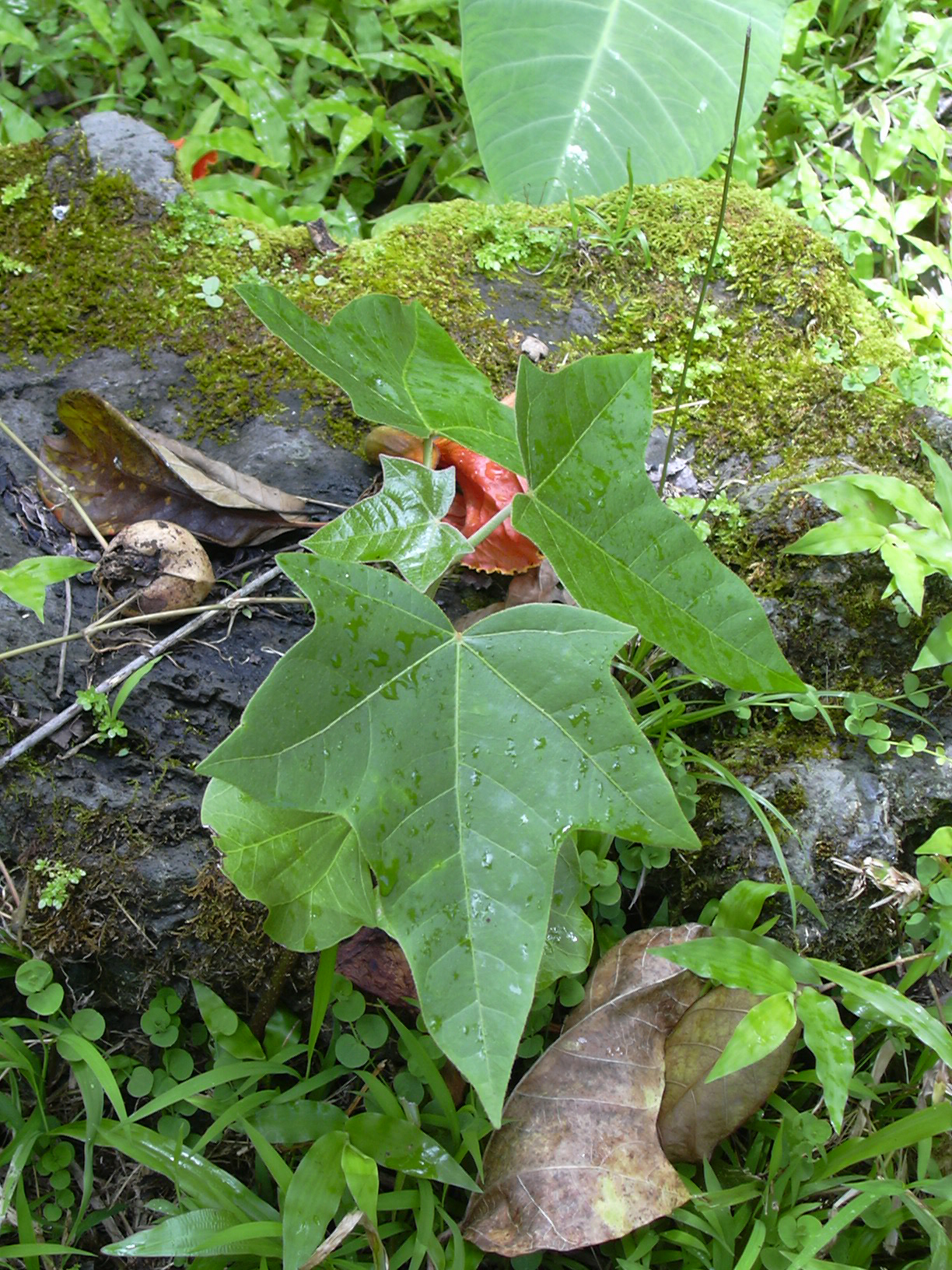
Candlenut seedling

Accepted species

The most widespread species is the candlenut (Aleurites moluccanus), occurring from tropical Asia and the Pacific, from India to China and Polynesia, Australia and New Zealand. Some botanists only recognize two species, A. moluccanus and A. rockinghamensis.

1. Aleurites moluccanus (L.) Willd. – Indian walnut, candlenut tree, country walnut, aburagiri, ama - most of genus range
2. Aleurites rockinghamensis (Baill.) P.I.Forst. - Papua New Guinea, Queensland

formerly included

moved to other genera: Croton, Mallotus, Omphalea, Reutealis, Vernicia

- A. cordatus - Vernicia cordata
- A. erraticus - Omphalea papuana
- A. fordii - Vernicia fordii
- A. japonicus - Vernicia cordata
- A. laccifer - Croton laccifer
- A. montanus - Vernicia montana
- A. peltatus - Mallotus peltatus
- A. saponarius - Reutealis trisperma
- A. trispermus - Reutealis trisperma
- A. vernicifluus - Vernicia cordata
- A. vernicius - Vernicia montana
