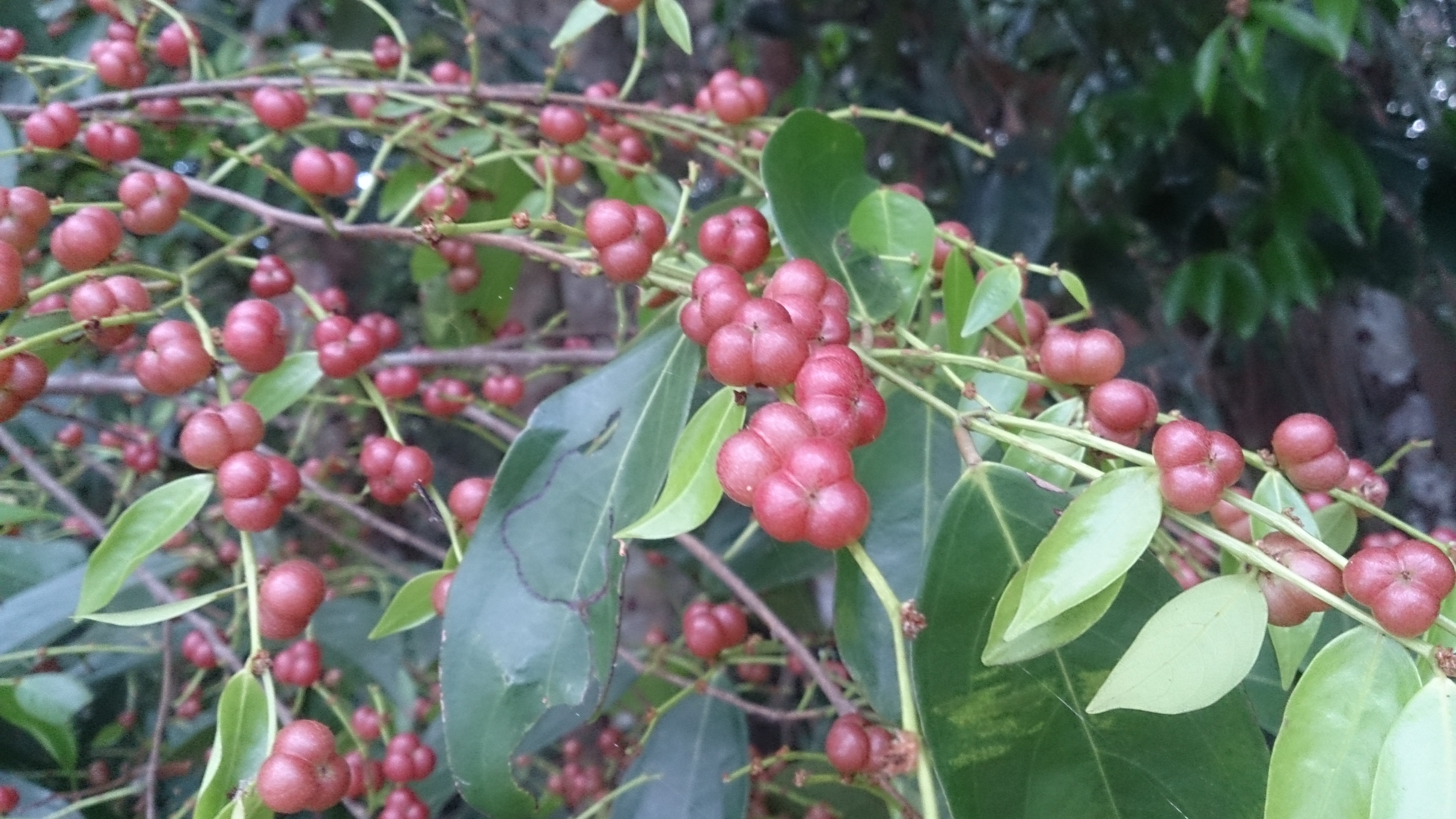

Conservation status
- Least Concern (IUCN 3.1)

Scientific classification
- Kingdom: Plantae
- Clade: Tracheophytes
- Clade: Angiosperms
- Clade: Eudicots
- Order: Santalales
- Family: Opiliaceae
- Genus: Champereia; Griff.
- Species: C. manillana

Binomial name
- Champereia manillana (Blume) Merr.

Synonyms
- Govantesia Llanos; Nallogia Baill.; Yunnanopilia C.Y.Wu & D.Z.Li; Cansjera manillana Blume; Opilia manillana (Blume) Baill.; Melientha longistaminea W.Z.Li; Champereia longistaminea (W.Z.Li) D.D.Tao; Yunnanopilia longistaminea (W.Z.Li) C.Y.Wu & D.Z.Li; Cansjera martabanica Wall.; Opilia cumingiana Baill.; Govantesia malulucban Llanos; Champereia gnetocarpa Kurz; Champereia griffithiana Planch. ex Kurz; Nallogia gaudichaudiana Baill.; Champereia gaudichaudiana (Baill.) Tiegh.; Champereia cumingiana (Baill.) Merr.; Champereia oblongifolia Merr.; Champereia platyphylla Merr.; Champereia lanceolata Merr.

= Champereia =

Genus of flowering plants

Champereia is a genus of plants in the family Opiliaceae described as a genus in 1843.

It contains only one known species, Champereia manillana, native to China (Guangxi, Yunnan), Taiwan, Southeast Asia, New Guinea, and Christmas Island.

Varieties

1. Champereia manillana var. longistaminea (W.Z.Li) H.S.Kiu - Yunnan, Guangxi
2. Champereia manillana var. manillana - Taiwan, Southeast Asia, New Guinea, and Christmas Island
