= Rhopalopilia =

Scientific classification
- Kingdom: Plantae
- Clade: Embryophytes
- Clade: Tracheophytes
- Clade: Spermatophytes
- Clade: Angiosperms
- Clade: Eudicots
- Order: Santalales
- Family: Opiliaceae
- Genus: Rhopalopilia; Pierre

Type species
- Rhopalopilia pallens Pierre

Genus of flowering plants

Rhopalopilia is a genus of plants in the family Opiliaceae described as a genus in 1896.

Rhopalopilia is native to west-central Africa.

Species

- Rhopalopilia altescandens Mildbr. ex Sleum. - Cameroon, Central African Republic, Republic of the Congo, Democratic Republic of the Congo
- Rhopalopilia hallei Villiers - Gabon
- Rhopalopilia pallens Pierre - Gabon, Cameroon, Central African Republic, Republic of the Congo, Democratic Republic of the Congo
