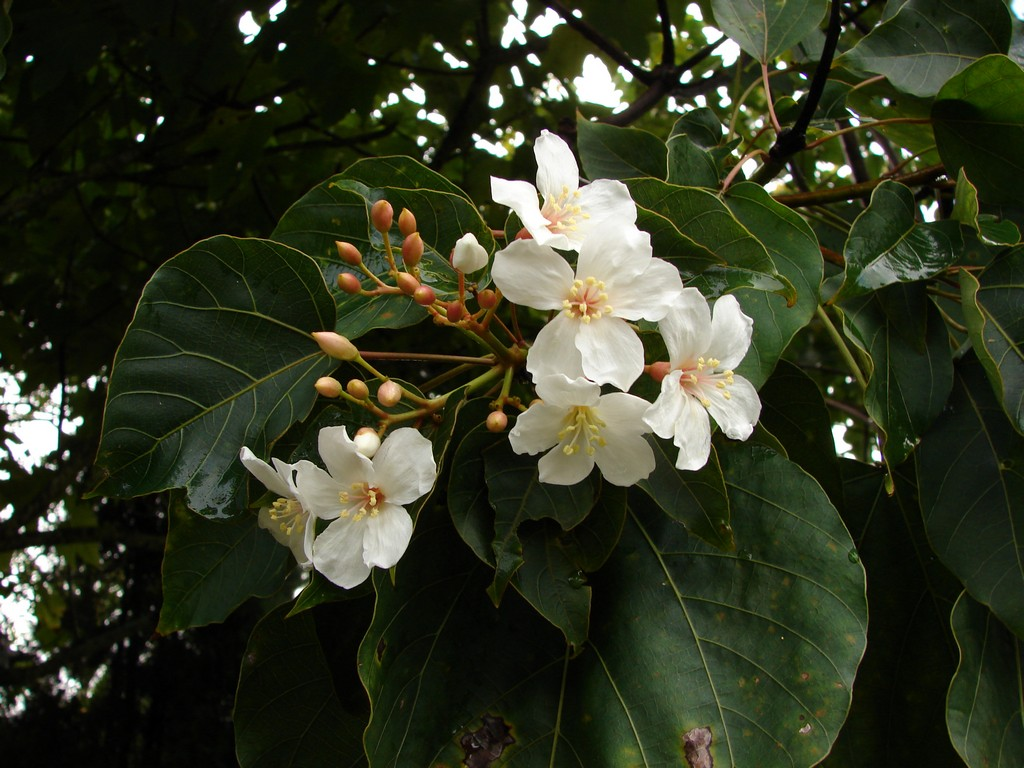

Conservation status
- Least Concern (IUCN 3.1)

Scientific classification
- Kingdom: Plantae
- Clade: Tracheophytes
- Clade: Angiosperms
- Clade: Eudicots
- Clade: Rosids
- Order: Malpighiales
- Family: Euphorbiaceae
- Genus: Vernicia
- Species: V. montana

Binomial name
- Vernicia montana Lour.

Synonyms
- Aleurites montanus (Lour.) E.H.Wilson; Aleurites vernicius (Corrêa) Hassk.; Dryandra vernicia Corrêa; Elaeococca montana (Lour.) Oken

= Vernicia montana =

Species of tree

Vernicia montana is a species of flowering plant in the spurge family, Euphorbiaceae. It is sometimes referred to by the common name mu oil tree, or chine wood oil tree.

== Description ==
It is a medium-sized deciduous tree reaching a height 20 metres (66 ft). The Latin specific epithet montana refers to mountains or coming from mountains. The leaves are large with three lobes. The monoecious white-petaled flowers emerged as inflorescences, containing both male and female flowers. The 2–3 inches (5.1–7.6 cm) fruit is a globular drupe with wrinkled skin that turns from green to yellow upon ripening. Each fruit contains 3 seeds, rich in oil.

== Distribution ==
It is native to Cambodia, South-Central and Southern China, Hainan, Myanmar, Taiwan, Thailand, Vietnam.

== Cultivation and uses ==
Vernicia montana is grown mostly for the seeds from which a varnish is made similar to the tung tree. The oil is prized as a wood finish. As the tree prefers well drained, sandy soils, the trees are grown on hillside plantations in northern Vietnam. In nature, V montana can be found at the margins of primary forests.

The wood is also harvested.

== Gallery ==
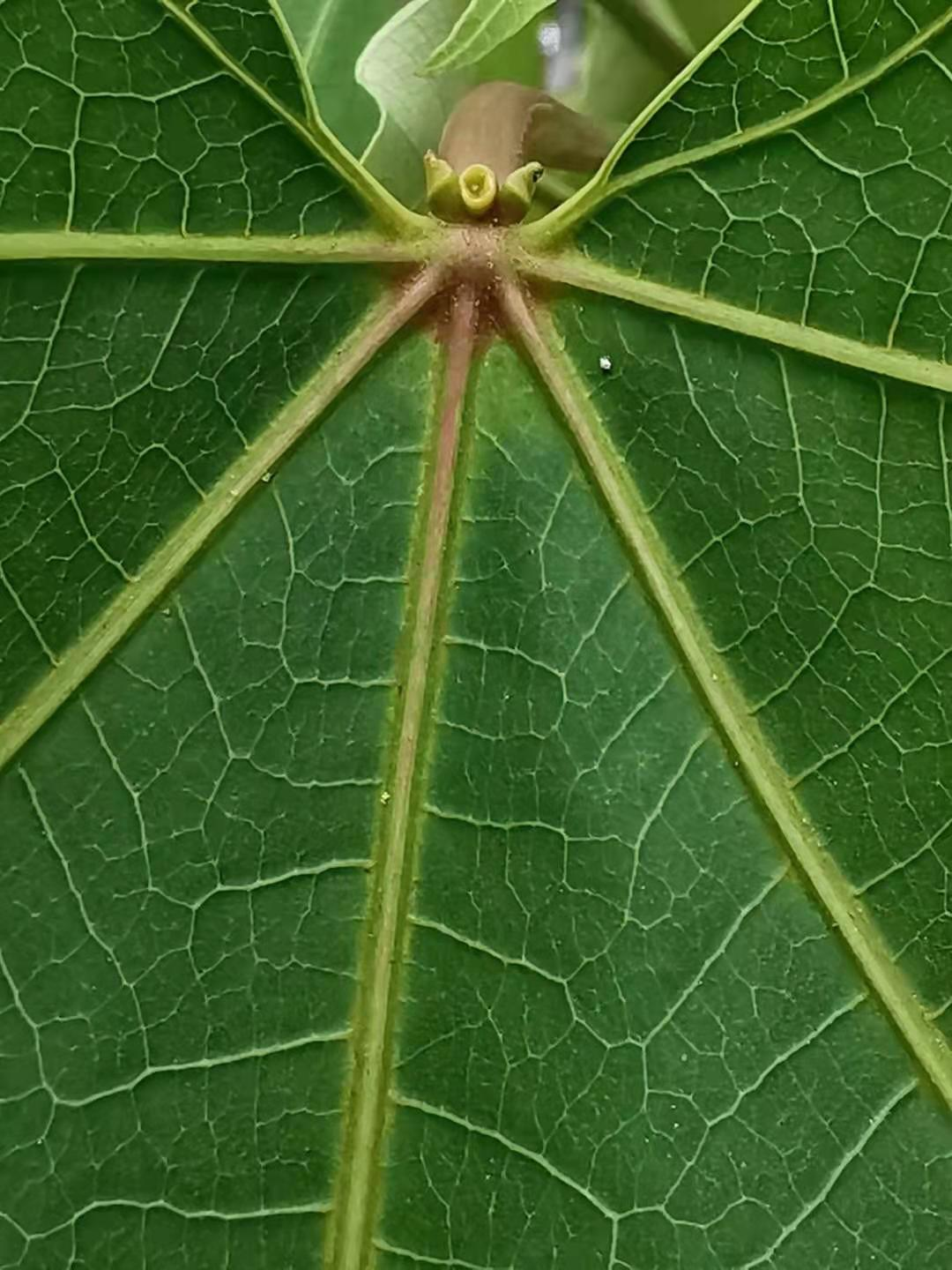
Glands and veins

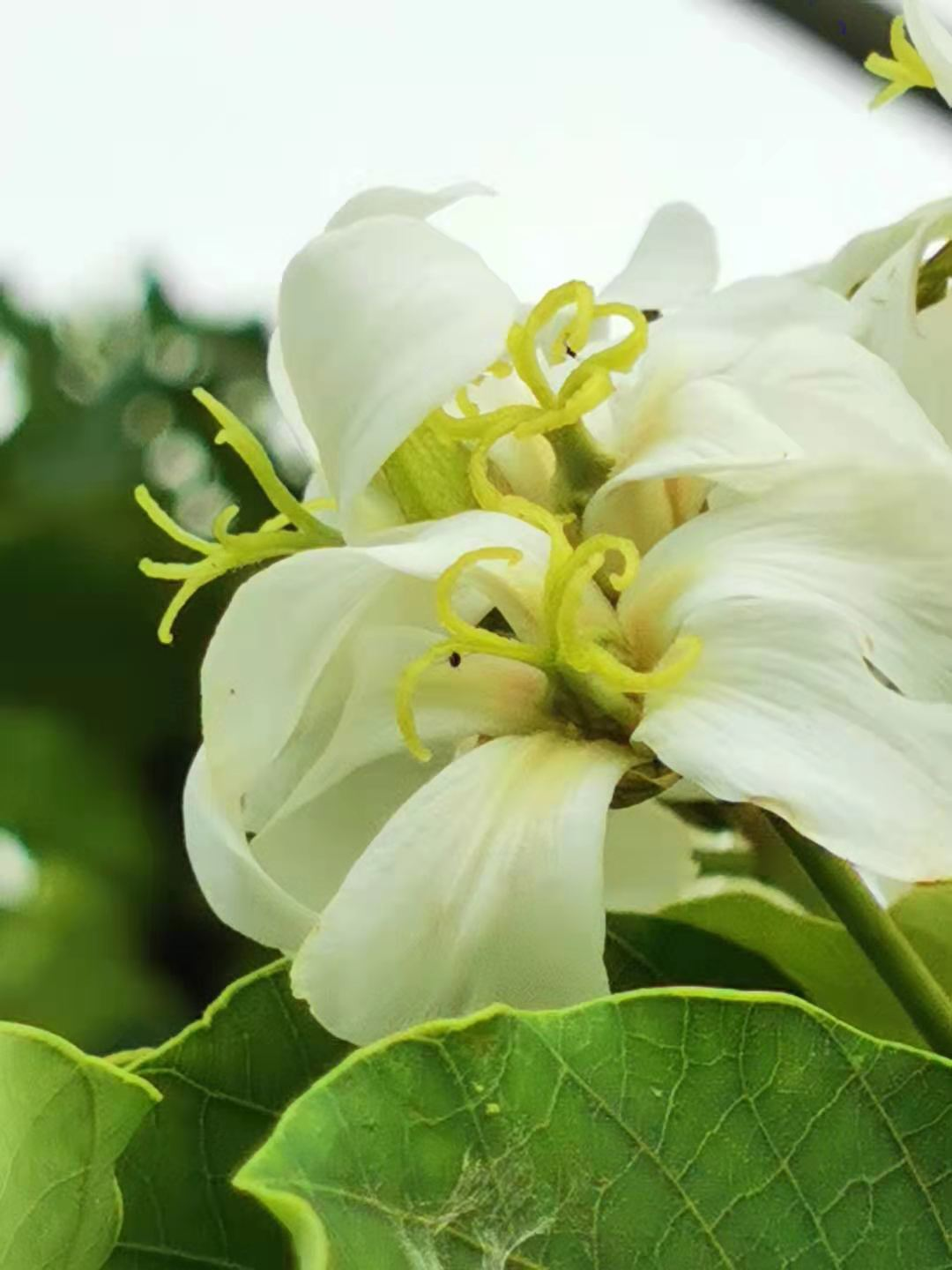
Female flower

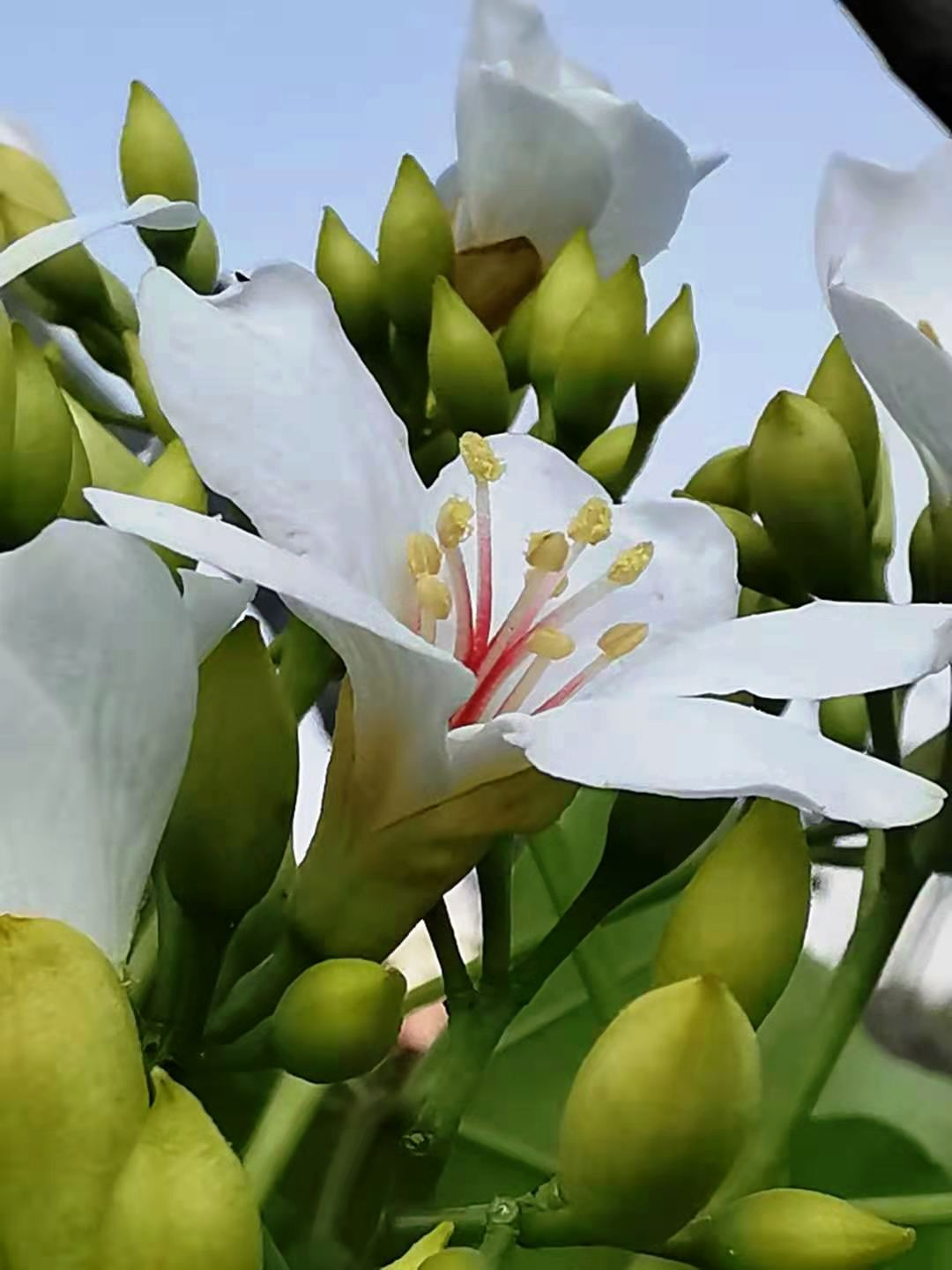
Male flower

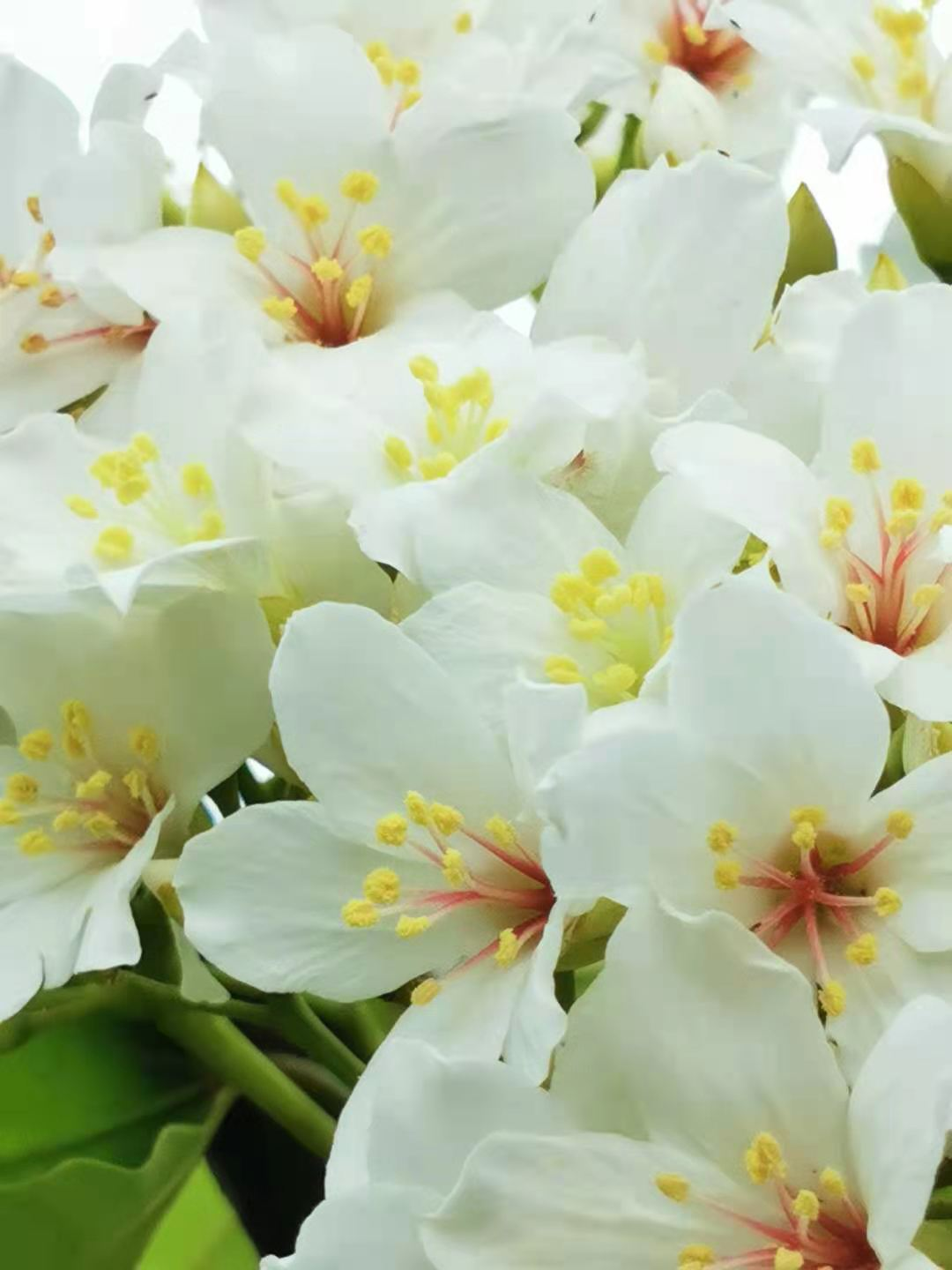
In full bloom

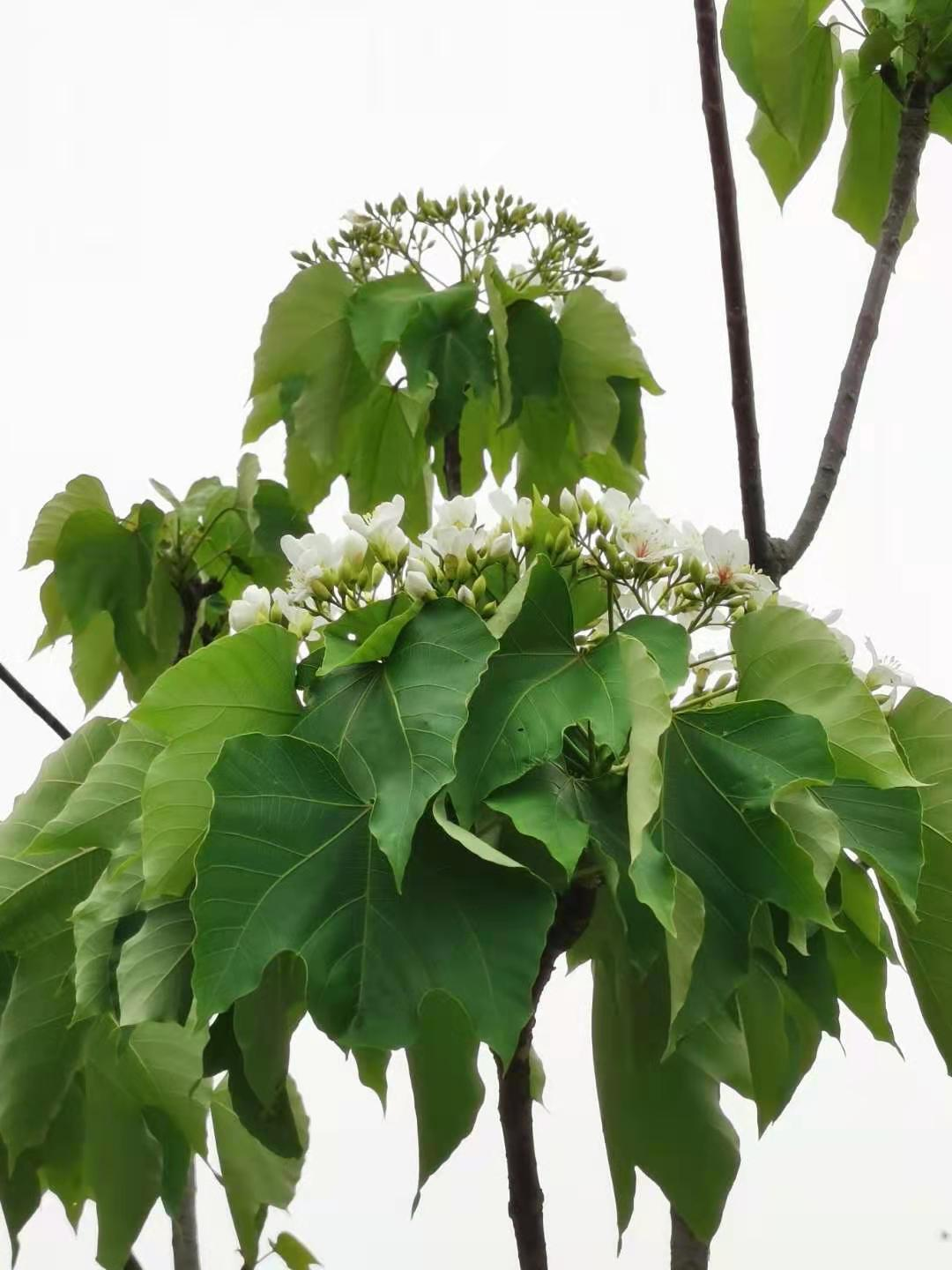
Inflorescence
