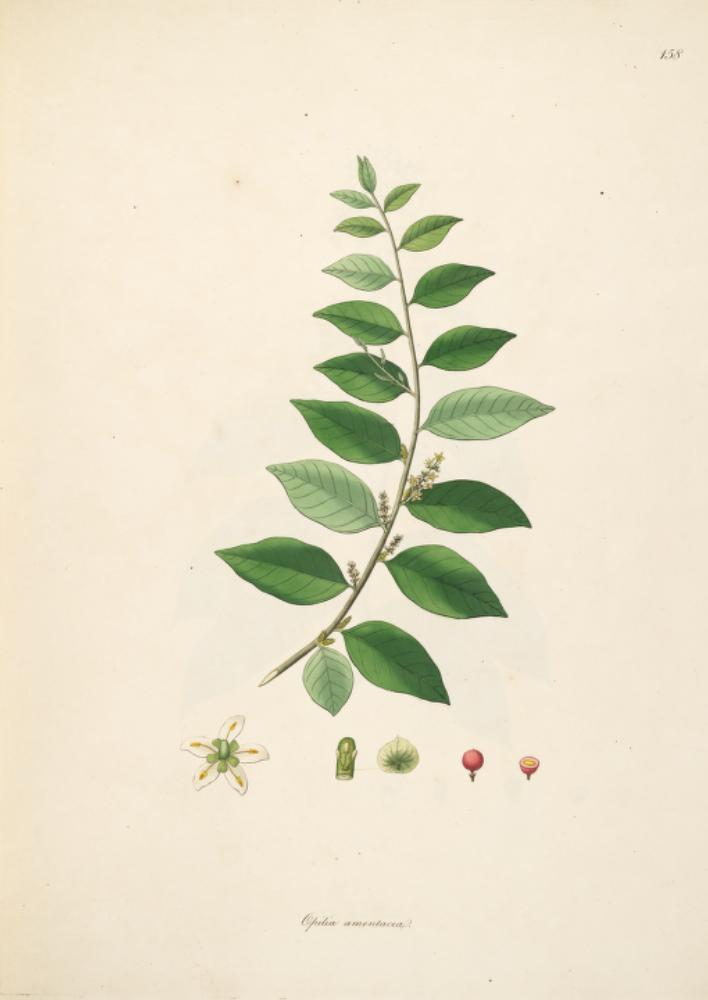
- Opilia amentacea

Scientific classification
- Kingdom: Plantae
- Clade: Tracheophytes
- Clade: Angiosperms
- Clade: Eudicots
- Order: Santalales
- Family: Opiliaceae; Valeton

Genera
- Agonandra; Cansjera; Champereia; Gjellerupia; Lepionurus; Melientha; Opilia; Pentarhopalopilia; Rhopalopilia; Urobotrya; Yunnanopilia

= Opiliaceae =

Family of flowering plants

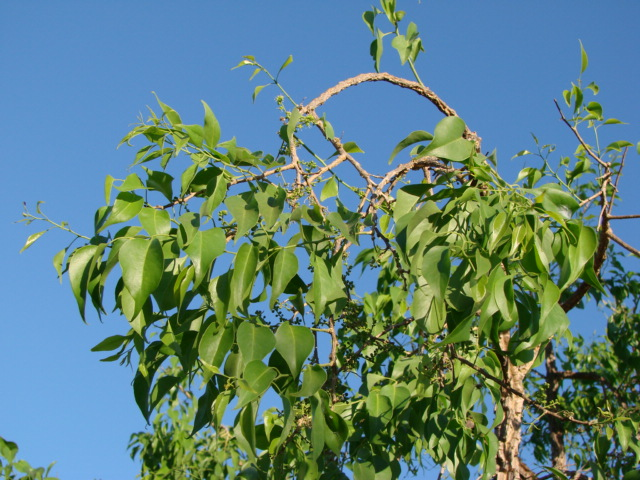
Agonandra brasiliensis

Opiliaceae is a family of flowering plants comprising 11 genera and 33 known species. It consists of tropical woody plants. Several genera contain parasitic species. The biggest genus, in number of species and in stature of the individual plants, is Agonandra, the only American genus.

Since it was first described this family has been recognized universally by taxonomists. The APG II system, of 2003 (unchanged from the APG system, of 1998), also recognizes this family and assigns it to the order Santalales in the clade core eudicots.
