= Slender threeseed mercury =

Slender threeseed mercury is a common name for several plants and may refer to:

- Acalypha gracilens
- Acalypha monococca
