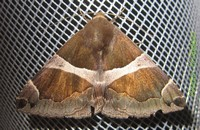

Scientific classification
- Kingdom: Animalia
- Phylum: Arthropoda
- Clade: Pancrustacea
- Class: Insecta
- Order: Lepidoptera
- Superfamily: Noctuoidea
- Family: Erebidae
- Genus: Dysgonia
- Species: D. torrida

Binomial name
- Dysgonia torrida (Guenée, 1852)

Synonyms
- List: Bastilla torrida; Ophiusa albivitta; Ophiusa festina; Ophiusa torrida Guenée, 1852; Parallelia torrida

= Dysgonia torrida =

Jigsaw

Species of moth

Dysgonia torrida, commonly known as the jigsaw, is a species of moth in the family Erebidae. The species was first described by Achille Guenée in 1852. It is found from the tropical and subtropical areas of Africa to Spain, southern Italy, Greece, Syria, Israel, Iran, Uzbekistan towards India, Sri Lanka and Myanmar.

== Description ==
This species has a wingspan of 45–50 mm. Colors highly variable. Body red-brown. Antemedial line of the forewing being erect and having broad, white and slightly suffused band beyond it. Postmedial line angled also between veins 3 and 4 and sinuous towards inner margin. Apical streak broken up into two spots. Hindwings with a white medial band and outer margin greyish at center.

== Ecology ==
There are multiple generations per year. In Europe adults are on wing from May to June and September. The larvae feed on Zea mays (Poaceae), Ricinus communis and Acalypha wilkesiana (Euphorbiaceae)
