= Turkey bush =

Turkey bush is a common name for several plants and may refer to:

- Acalypha eremorum, endemic to Queensland
- Calytrix exstipulata, endemic to Western Australia
- Eremophila deserti, endemic to Australia
- Grewia retusifolia
- Psychotria daphnoides endemic to northern NSW and QLD
