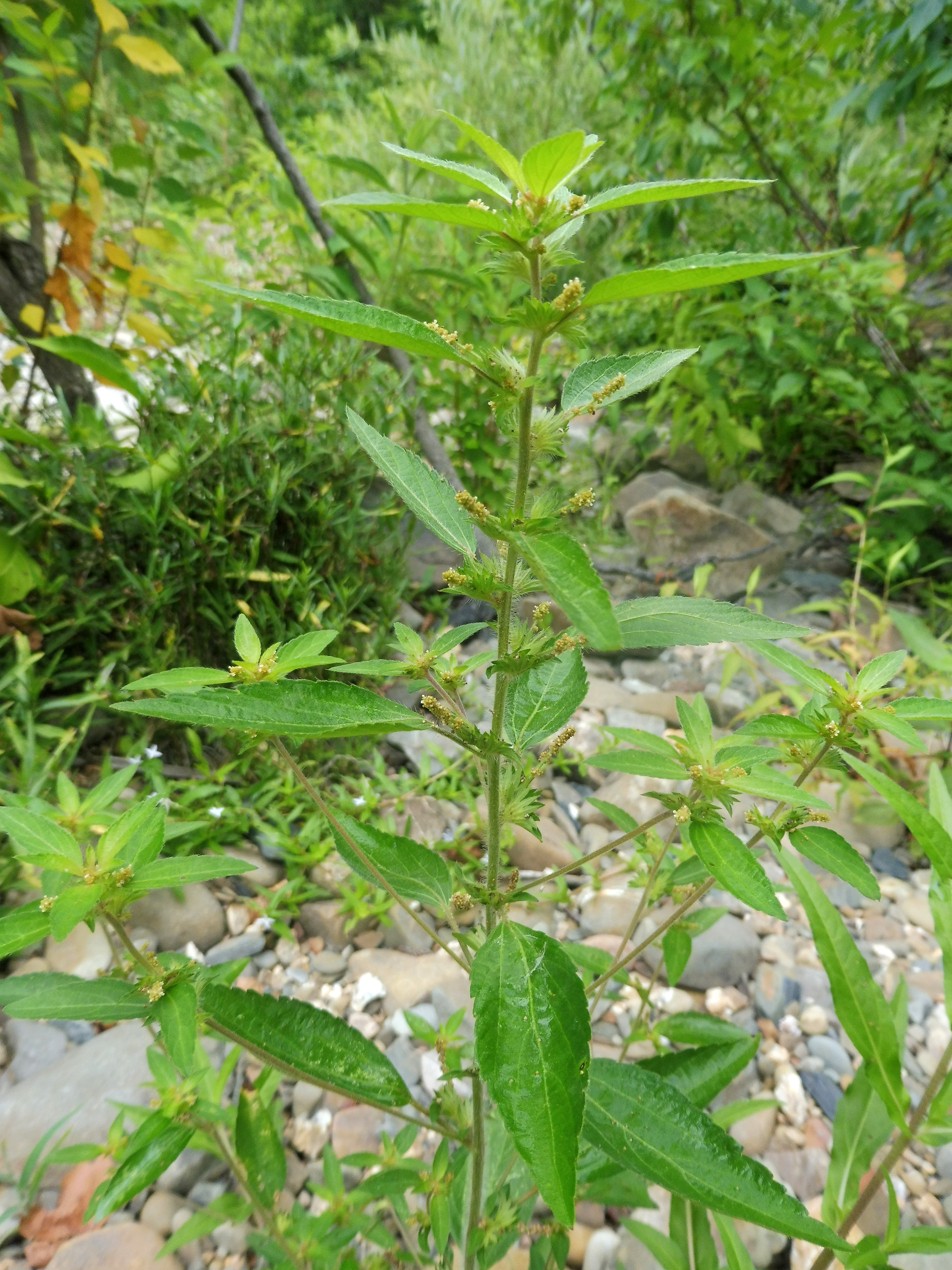

Conservation status
- Secure (NatureServe)

Scientific classification
- Kingdom: Plantae
- Clade: Tracheophytes
- Clade: Angiosperms
- Clade: Eudicots
- Clade: Rosids
- Order: Malpighiales
- Family: Euphorbiaceae
- Genus: Acalypha
- Species: A. virginica

Binomial name
- Acalypha virginica L.

= Acalypha virginica =

Species of flowering plant

Acalypha virginica, commonly called Virginia threeseed mercury or Virginia copperleaf, is a plant in the spurge family (Euphorbiaceae). It is native to the eastern United States. It is found in a variety of natural habitats, particularly in open woodlands and along riverbanks. It is a somewhat weedy species that responds positively to ecological disturbance, and can be found in degraded habitats such as agricultural fields.

Acalypha virginica is an erect herbaceous annual growing to 50 centimetres (20 in) tall. It is monoecious, and produces small greenish axillary flowers with no petals. It blooms in summer through fall. It bears a similarity to Acalypha gracilens which occupies much of its geographic range. Acalypha virginica can be distinguished by its pistillate bracts which are hirsute and lack glands (vs. Acalypha gracilens, which has pistillate bracts that are sparsely pubescent and red-glandular).

For conservation, Acalypha virginica is considered to be globally secure. It is a common species throughout much of its range, and is found in a wide variety of habitats. However, it becomes uncommon at the edges of its range, and is listed as a special concern species in Connecticut. In Maine, the only documented occurrence of this species was collected from Parsonsfield in 1902, and it is currently thought to be extirpated from the state.
