= Species Plantarum =

Book by Carl Linnaeus

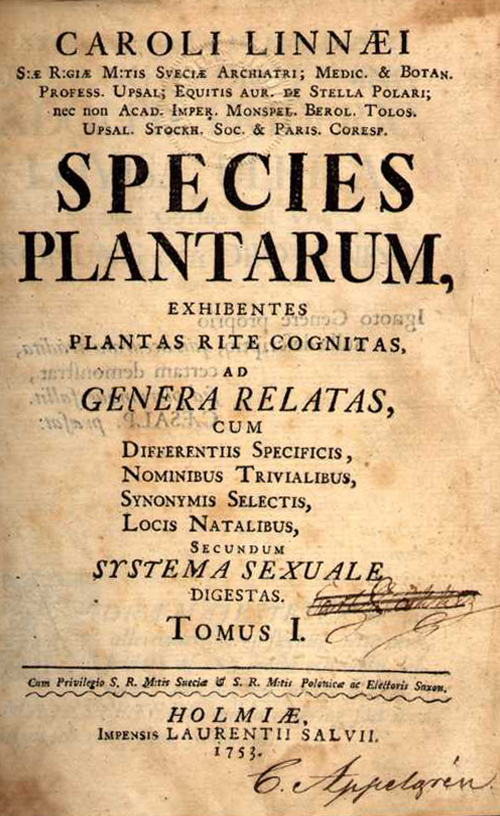
- Cover page of first edition
- Author: Carl Linnaeus
- Language: Latin
- Subject: Botany
- Published: Laurentius Salvius (1 May 1753)
- Publication place: Sweden
- Media type: Print
- Pages: xi, 1200 + xxxi
- OCLC: 186272535

Species Plantarum (Latin for "The Species of Plants") is a book by Carl Linnaeus, originally published in 1753, which lists every species of plant known at the time, classified into genera. It is the first work to consistently apply binomial names and was the starting point for the naming of plants.

== Publication ==
Species Plantarum (Note: Its full title is Species plantarum, exhibentes plantas rite cognitas ad genera relatas, cum differentiis specificis, nominibus trivialibus, synonymis selectis, locis natalibus, secundum systema sexuale digestas.) was published on 1 May 1753 by Laurentius Salvius in Stockholm, in two volumes. (Note: The book was actually published in two volumes, the first being on 24 May and the second on 16 August. However, for practical purposes, the dates of issue for volumes was arbitrarily set on 1 May, see Stearn, W.T. (1957), The preparation of the Species Plantarum and the introduction of binomial nomenclature, in: Species Plantarum, A Facsimile of the first edition, London, Ray Society: 72 and ICN (Melbourne Code) Art. 13.4 Note 1: "The two volumes of Linnaeus' Species plantarum, ed. 1 (1753), which appeared in May and August, 1753, respectively, are treated as having been published simultaneously on 1 May 1753.") A second edition was published in 1762–1763, and a third edition in 1764, although this "scarcely differed" from the second. Further editions were published after Linnaeus' death in 1778, under the direction of Karl Ludwig Willdenow, the director of the Berlin Botanical Garden; the fifth edition was titled "fourth edition" and was published by Willdenow in four volumes, 1798 (1), 1800 (2), 1801 (3^{1}), 1803 (3^{2}), 1804 (3^{3}), 1805 (4^{1}), 1806 (4^{2}), rather than the dates printed on the volumes themselves.

== Importance ==
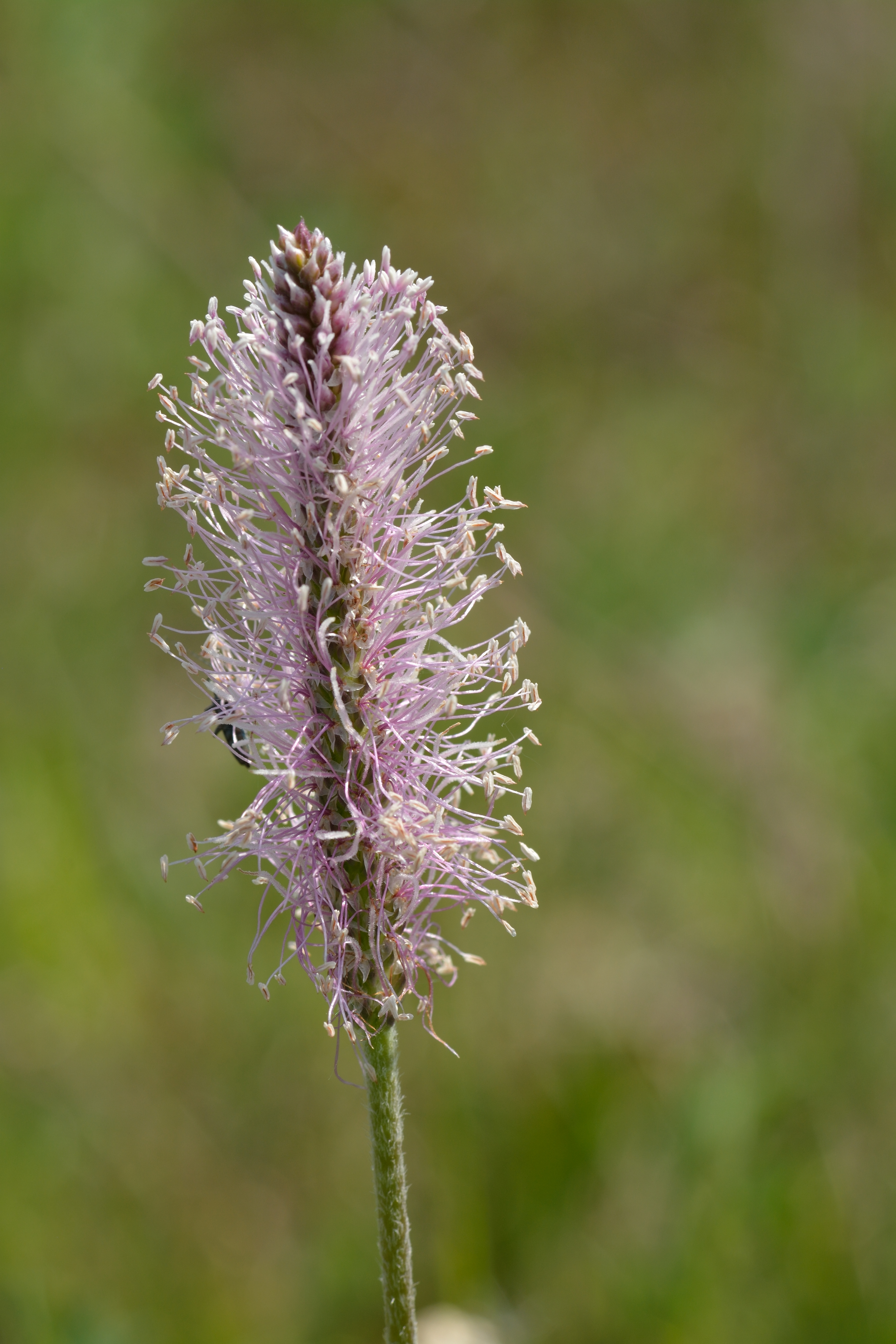
Before Species Plantarum, this plant was referred to as "Plantago foliis ovato-lanceolatis pubescentibus, spica cylindrica, scapo tereti"; Linnaeus renamed it Plantago media.

Species Plantarum was the first botanical work to consistently apply the binomial nomenclature system of naming to any large group of organisms (Linnaeus' tenth edition of Systema Naturae would apply the same technique to animals for the first time in 1758). Prior to this work, a plant species would be known by a long polynomial, such as Plantago foliis ovato-lanceolatis pubescentibus, spica cylindrica, scapo tereti (meaning "plantain with pubescent ovate-lanceolate leaves, a cylindrical spike and a terete scape") or Nepeta floribus interrupte spicatis pedunculatis (meaning "Nepeta with flowers in a stalked, interrupted spike"). In Species Plantarum, these cumbersome names were replaced with two-part names, consisting of a single-word genus name, and a single-word specific epithet or "trivial name"; the two examples above became Plantago media and Nepeta cataria, respectively. The use of binomial names had originally been developed as a kind of shorthand in a student project about the plants eaten by cattle.

After the specific epithet, Linnaeus gave a short description of each species, and a synonymy. The descriptions were careful and terse, consisting of few words in small genera; in Glycyrrhiza, for instance, the three species (Glycyrrhiza echinata, Glycyrrhiza glabra and "Glycyrrhiza hirsuta", (Note: Now considered a synonym of G. glabra.) respectively) were described as "leguminibus echinatis", "leguminibus glabris" and "leguminibus hirsutis".

Because it is the first work in which binomial nomenclature was consistently applied, Species Plantarum was chosen as the "starting point" for the nomenclature of most plants (the nomenclature of some non-vascular plants and all fungi uses later starting points).

== Contents ==
Species Plantarum contained descriptions of the thousands of plant species known to Linnaeus at the time. In the first edition, there were 5,940 names, from Acalypha australis to Zygophyllum spinosum. In his introduction, Linnaeus estimated that there were fewer than 10,000 plant species in existence; there are now thought to be around 400,000 species of flowering plants alone.

The species were arranged in around a thousand genera, which were grouped into 24 classes, according to Linnaeus' sexual system of classification. There are no descriptions of the genera in Species Plantarum; these are supplied in the companion volume Genera Plantarum (lit. 'the genera of plants'), the fifth edition of which was printed at a similar time to the first edition of Species Plantarum. (Note: The fifth edition of Genera Plantarum was published in 1754, and contains a supplement to Species Plantarum, first published the year before.) Linnaeus acknowledged his "sexual system" was an artificial system, rather than one which accurately reflects shared ancestry, but the system's simplicity made it easier for non-specialists to rapidly find the correct class, being based on simple counts of floral parts such as stigmas and stamens.

== Bibliography ==
- Linnaeus, Carl (1753). Species Plantarum: exhibentes plantas rite cognitas, ad genera relatas, cum differentiis specificis, nominibus trivialibus, synonymis selectis, locis natalibus, secundum systema sexuale digestas (1st ed.). Stockholm: Impensis Laurentii Salvii.
  - Species Plantarum, vol. 1, vol. 2 at Biodiversity Heritage Library facsimile
  - Species Plantarum, vol. 1, vol. 2 at Botanicus
- Linnaeus, Carl (1763). Species Plantarum: exhibentes plantas rite cognitas, ad genera relatas, cum differentiis specificis, nominibus trivialibus, synonymis selectis, locis natalibus, secundum systema sexuale digestas (2nd ed.). Stockholm: Impensis Laurentii Salvii.
- Species Plantarum at Project Gutenberg I–III IV–V VI–X XI–XIII text
- Linnaeus Link Union Catalogue
