= Acalypha psilostachya =

Scientific classification
- Kingdom: Plantae
- Clade: Embryophytes
- Clade: Tracheophytes
- Clade: Angiosperms
- Clade: Eudicots
- Clade: Rosids
- Order: Malpighiales
- Family: Euphorbiaceae
- Subtribe: Acalyphinae
- Genus: Acalypha
- Species: A. psilostachya

Binomial name
- Acalypha psilostachya Hochst. ex A.Rich.

Species of flowering plant

Acalypha psilostachya is a species in the botanical family Euphorbiaceae. In East Africa it is used as a medicinal plant.

== Geographic distribution ==
Acalypha psilostachya occurs throughout East Africa and in southern Africa it occurs in Malawi, Zambia, Mozambique and Angola.
