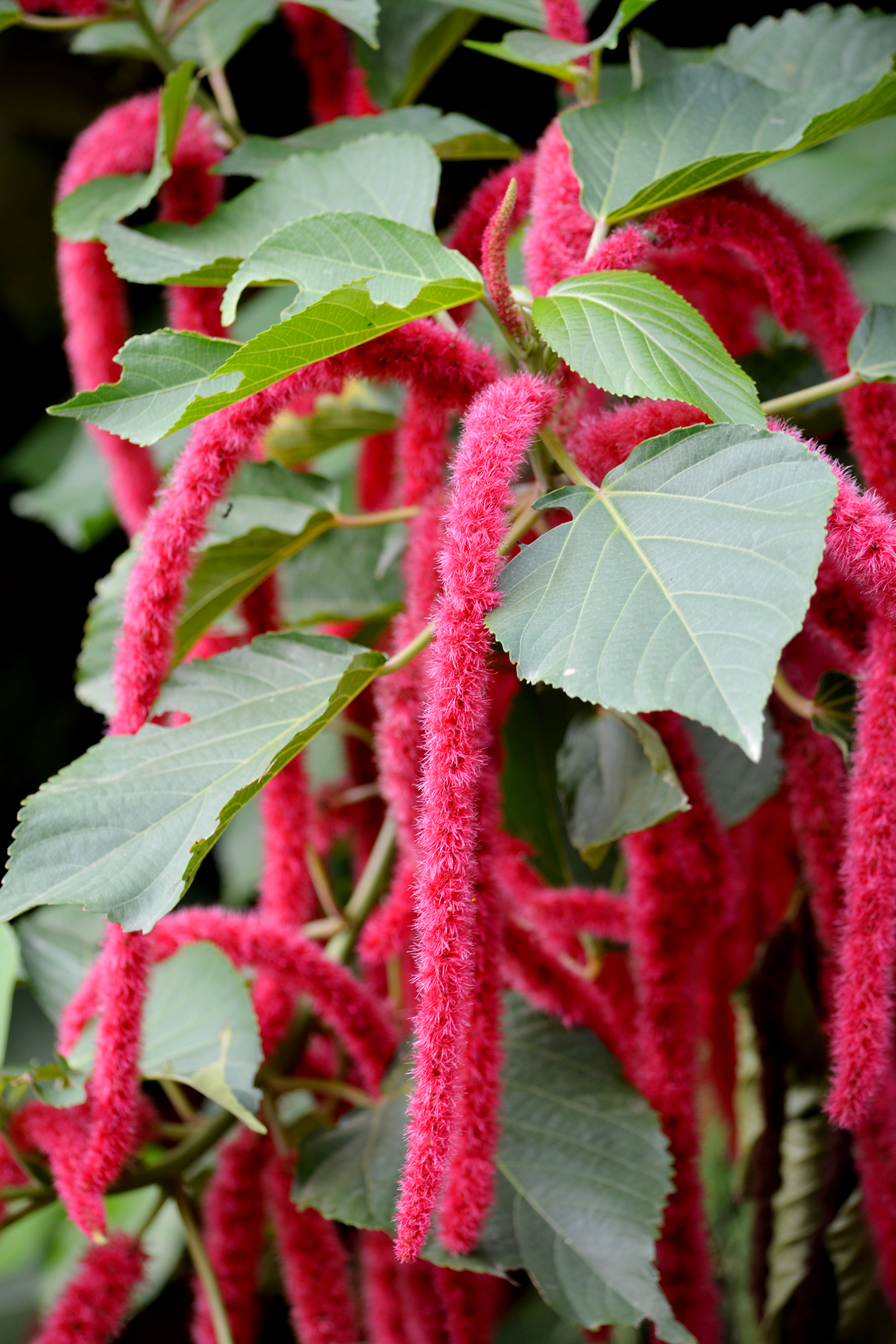
- Chenille plant (Acalypha hispida)

Scientific classification
- Kingdom: Plantae
- Clade: Embryophytes
- Clade: Tracheophytes
- Clade: Spermatophytes
- Clade: Angiosperms
- Clade: Eudicots
- Clade: Rosids
- Order: Malpighiales
- Family: Euphorbiaceae
- Subfamily: Acalyphoideae
- Tribe: Acalypheae
- Subtribe: Acalyphinae
- Genus: Acalypha; L.

Species
- 450-462, see text

Synonyms
- Acalyphes Hassk.; Acalyphopsis Pax & K.Hoffm.; Calyptrospatha Klotzsch ex Baill.; Caturus L.; Corythea S.Watson; Cupameni Adans.; Galurus Spreng.; Gymnalypha Griseb.; Linostachys Klotzsch ex Schltdl.; Mercuriastrum Fabr.; Odonteilema Turcz.; Paracelsea Zoll.; Ricinocarpus Kuntze; Schizogyne Ehrenb. ex Pax (non Cass.: preoccupied); Usteria Dennst. (non Willd.: preoccupied)

= Acalypha =

Genus of flowering plants

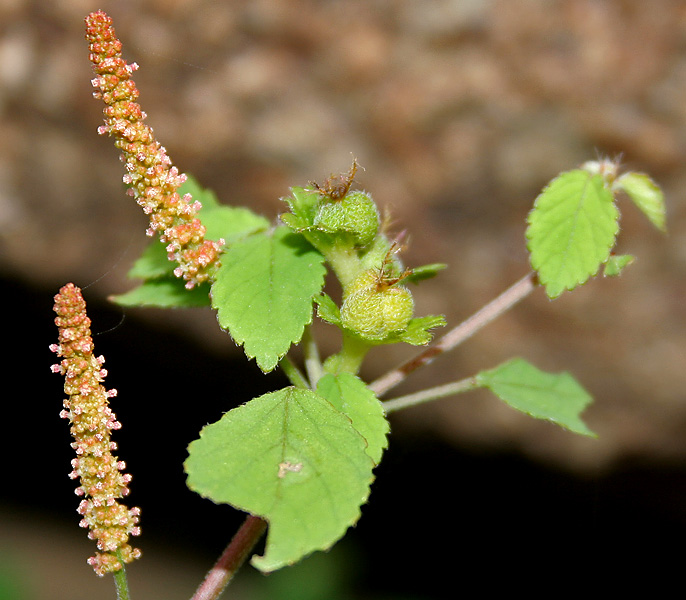
Acalypha capitata

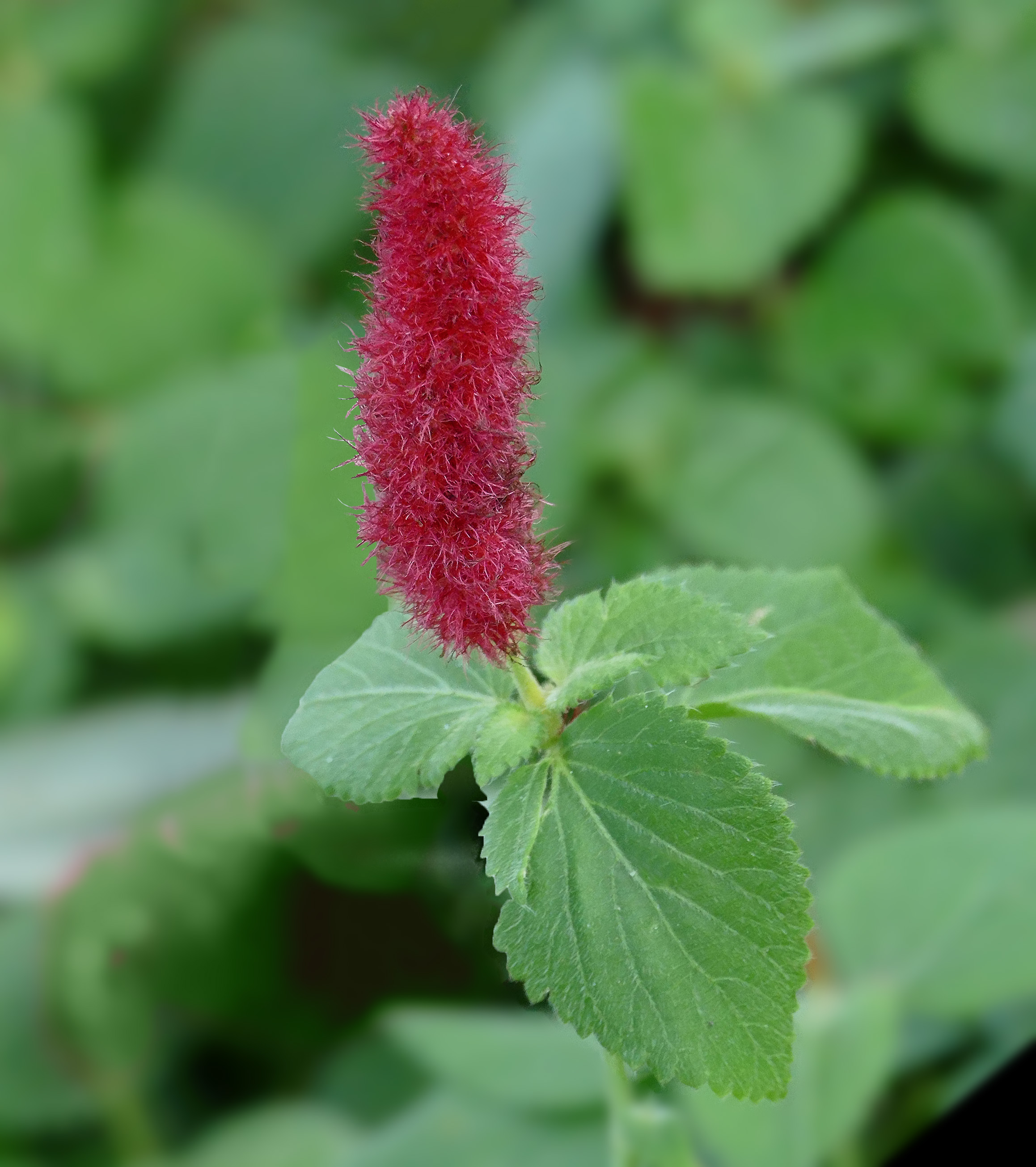
Firetail Chenille Plant, Acalypha pendula

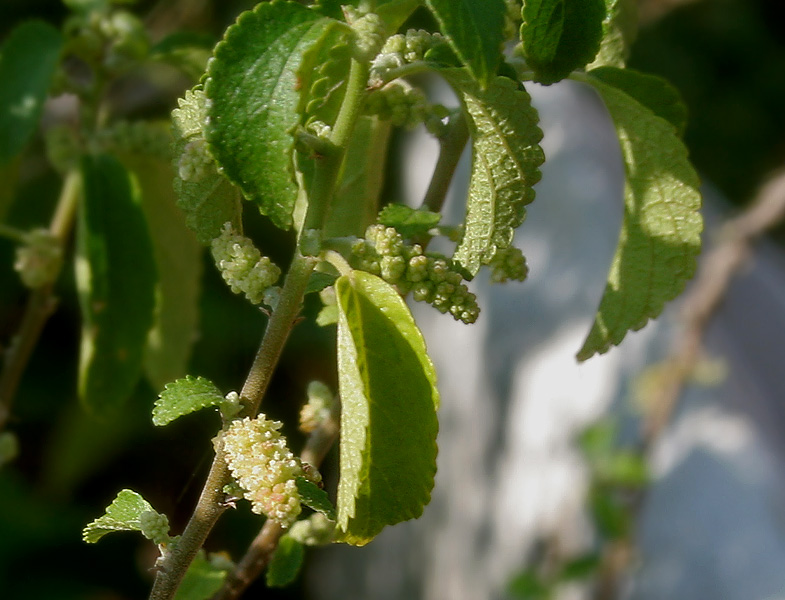
Acalypha fruticosa

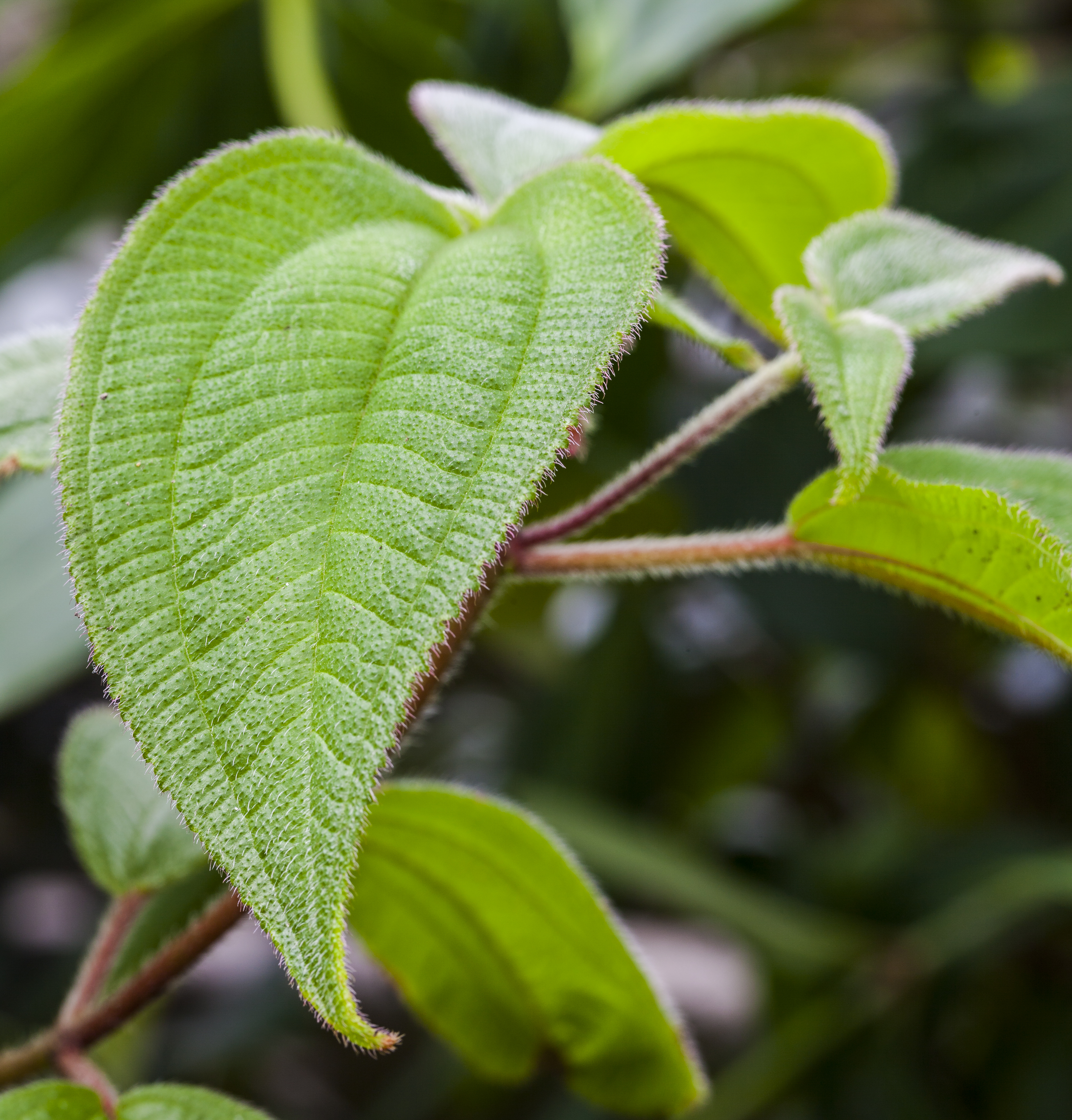
Acalypha cuneata

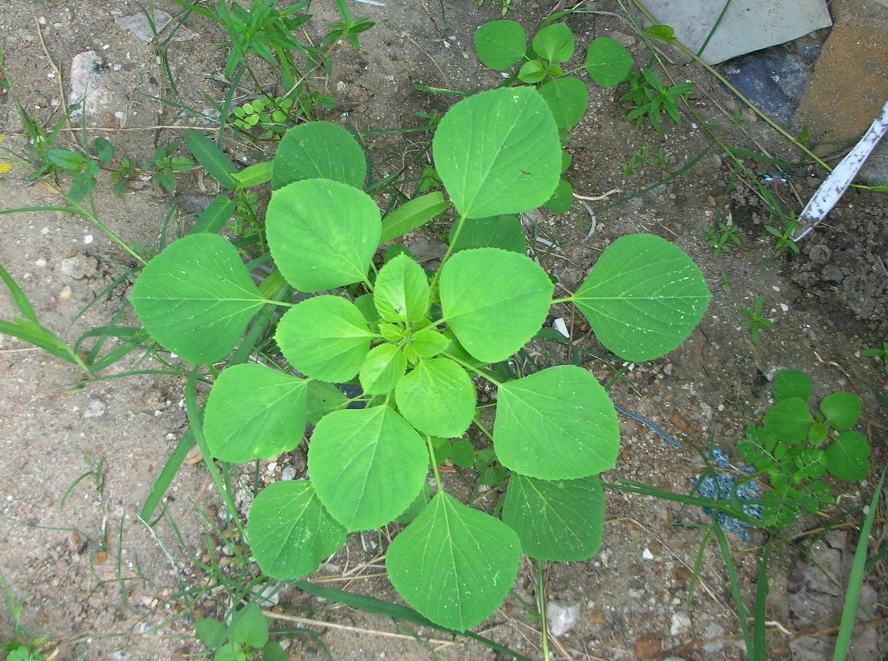
Acalypha indica

Acalypha is a genus of flowering plants in the family Euphorbiaceae. It is the sole genus of the subtribe Acalyphinae. It is one of the largest euphorb genera, with approximately 450 to 462 species. The genus name Acalypha is from the Ancient Greek ἀκαλύφη (akalúphē) ("nettle"), an alternative form of ἀκαλήφη (akalḗphē), and was inspired by the nettle-like leaves. General common names include copperleaf and three-seeded mercury. Native North American species are generally inconspicuous most of the year until the fall when their stems and foliage turn a distinctive coppery-red.

The genus is distributed mainly in the tropics and subtropics, with about 60% of species native to the Americas and about 30% in Africa.

== Description ==
The genus includes annuals or perennial herbs, shrubs, and small trees. Most are monoecious, and some are dioecious. Indumentum of simple hair or glands, rarely of stellate hair. The leaves are alternately arranged, undivided, generally petiolate, stipulate; stipels rarely present at apex of petiole or leaf base, caduceus. The blades entire or more frequently dentate or crenate, pinnately or palmately veined. There are several types of inflorescence, terminal or axillary, frequently both, unisexual or androgynous. Male inflorescences spicate, densely flowered, with several flowers at each node subtended by a minute bract. Female inflorescences generally spicate, sometimes racemose or panicle-shaped, with 1–3(–5) flowers at each node, usually subtended by a large bract, increasing and foliaceous in the fruit, generally dentate or lobed; sometimes subtended by a small bract, entire or lobed, non accrescent in the fruit. Androgynous inflorescences usually with female flowers at proximal nodes and male flower at distal nodes. Flowers unisexual, apetalous, disc absent. Male flowers very small, shortly pedicellate, globose in bud; calyx parted into 4 small valvate sepals; stamens 4–8(–16) on a slightly raised receptacle, filaments free or basally connate; anthers with divaricate or pendulous thecae, unilocular, more or less elongated and later becoming vermiform; pollen grains oblate-spheroidal, with 3–5 pseudopores, tectate, psilate; pistillode absent. Female flowers generally sessile or subsessile, pedicellate in a few species; calyx of 3– (4–5) small sepals imbricate, connate at base; ovary of [1–2]3 carpels, surface often muricate, pubescent or papillose; ovules solitary in each cell, anatropes; styles reddish, free or basally connate, several times divided into filiform segment, rarely bifid or entire; staminodes absent. Fruits capsular, small, 3-lobed, soon dehiscing septicidally into 3 bivalved cocci; generally surrounded by the accrescent female bract. Seeds small, ovoid or ellipsoid, usually carunculate, smooth or foveolate; endosperm present, whitish; the embryo straight; cotyledons broad and flat. Allomorphic female flowers present in some species, generally terminal (sometimes median or basal) in the inflorescences; ebracteate, long pedicellate or subsessile; calyx as in the normal female flowers; ovary and fruits 1–2 locular.

Extrafloral nectaries have been found on A. amentacea.

== Taxonomy ==
The genus Acalypha was described in the Species Plantarum by Linné (1753), as belonging to the monoecia monadelphia class along with other Euphorbiaceae genera such as Croton, Jatropha and Ricinus. Previously it was also included in the Corollarium Generum Plantarum (Linné, 1737). Its definition has been changed very little ever since, and it is confirmed as a natural and well specified genus. In its Species Plantarum, Linné sets forth the first three binominal names, i.e. A. virginica from North America, and A. indica and A. australis from Asia; in 1760 he describes a fourth species: A. virgata from Jamaica. In the same year, Nikolaus Joseph von Jacquin, as a result from his journey to Caribbean Sea, writes Enumeratio Systematica Plantarum, in which species A. villosa and A. carthagenensis from Colombia, and A. corensis from Venezuela are described. The first Acalypha iconographies are also shown in the books by Jacquin; there coloured sheets of A. villosa (Jacquin, 1776), A. alopecuroides (Jacquin, 1792), A. cuspidata, A. diversifolia and A. macrostachya (Jacquin, 1797) can be found.

Until the late 18th century the outstanding incorporations to the genus were those from Pehr Forsskål, a Linné student, who sets forth six new species in his Flora Aegyptiaco-Arabica in 1775; and also those from Swedish botanist Olof Swartz, author of Nova Genera et Species Plantarum seu Prodromus, in 1788, where eight new species are published as a result of a journey around Western Indies. In 1789 Antoine de Jussieu also incorporates Acalypha in his Genera Plantarum. 19th century going on, Antonio José Cavanilles describes six species from Mexico: these were collected by Luis Née, a botanist from Malaspina Expedition (Cavanilles, 1800). One year later, such species are again included in his book Icones et Descriptiones Plantarum together with some excellent monochrome drawings.

In 1804 and 1816, Jean Louis Marie Poiret makes the first compilation of all Acalypha known species in the Encyclopédie Méthodique, Botanique by Jean Baptiste Lamarck (vol. VI and suppl. IV). There he describes forty species, thirteen of them for the first time. In 1805, Carl Ludwig Willdenow compiles and describes thirty nine Acalypha species in his Species Plantarum, in which the first classification of genus is made. The species are grouped as to whether they are monoecious or dioecious, and to the position of flowers and inflorescences. As an offspring from the American journey made by Alexander von Humboldt and Aimé Bonpland, twelve new Acalypha species, from Mexico and Colombia, are described by Sigmund Kunth in Nova Genera et Species Plantarum (1817, 1825).

In 1826, Kurt Sprengel compiles fifty eighth Acalypha species in his Systema Vegetabilium, seven of them brand new. He puts them together under a key with characters similar to those used by Willdenow, finally, the herbaceous species are separated from the woody species. During the first half of the 19th century, many new species are published all around the world, with emphasis on the works by Eduard Poeppig (1841) and George Bentham (1839, 1844) about American species.

In the French botanist Henri Baillon publication Étude générale du groupe des Euphorbiacées (1858), a large morphological description of genus is made, and a peculiar classification is presented: two sections are considered –“Sect. A” and “Sect. B”– depending on whether the inflorescence axis is simple or branched out, and the female flowers calyx consists of three or five sepals. Baillon continued to publish a series of works under the title Euphorbiacées américaines, to be issued in the first volumes of Adansonia journal, between 1860 and 1864. More than fifty new species of Acalypha are described thereto, most of them from South America, and specially from Brazil.

Johannes Müller Argoviensis, a Swiss botanist specialist in lichens and director of Geneva herbarium, was entrusted with making a good many Euphorbiaceae, Acalyphagenus included, ready for De Candolle’s Prodromus (Müller Argoviensis, 1866). As a preparation for that public book, he published in Flora journal a lot of descriptions of new species based on specimens of Hooker herbarium, at Kew Gardens (Müller Argoviensis, 1864). In such a work, Müller for the first time uses a classification of Acalypha in two sections, i. e. “Linostachys” and “Euacalypha”, names which accompany each of the described species. In 1865, he publishes in Linnaea journal a first revision of genus, in which 164 species are gathered –67 of them first time described– and Acalypha is formally divided into two sections as above referred. The Linostachys section is based on the homonymous genus from Klotzsch (1846), and includes seven species with pedicellate male flowers and bracts non-increasing in the fruit. The Euacalypha section incorporates all 157 remaining species, which have sessile female flowers and bracts increasing in the fruit. This latter section is in turn divided into “series”, “subseries”, and finally in groups designated by the symbol “§”, mainly according to the relative positions of male and female flowers in inflorescences and depending on whether these are axillary or terminal, unisexual or bisexual. Finally, in De Candolle’s Prodromus (Müller Argoviensis, 1866) 30 new species are described, thus raising up to 215 the number of accepted species, which are ordered as per such a complex infrasectional classification. Nearly all names of subgeneric taxa from Müller are illegitimate according to the current rules of International Code of Botanic Nomenclature. Müller Argoviensis was also entrusted with the preparation of Acalypha for the Flora Brasiliensis of Martius (Müller Argoviensis, 1874), in which 10 new species are described. There he maintains his two sections, but he does not use the infrasectional classification.

From 1867 to 1923 no new proposal is made concerning the classification of the high number of species which genus already consists of. This is, however, a plentiful period in discovery and description of new species: ca. 220 are published. We must highlight the work from John Hutchinson (1913) for Flora of Tropical Africa by Thiselton-Dyer, where he is dealing with 42 species in modern flower format and, for the first time, he introduces a dichotomous identification key.

In 1894 Ferdinand Pax, one of the most productive collaborators in the Engler German school, publishes 12 new African species of Acalypha. Pax, and the German botanist Käte Hoffmann, were entrusted with preparing the genus for the enormous Das Pflanzenreich, where all species known in the world so far are gathered and ordered (Pax & Hoffmann, 1924). They deem ca. 390 species as valid ones, of which 81 are first time described. Such a work is considered, even now, as the most complete revision of genus worldwide, and the necessary reference point for any taxonomic or local flora study. The infrageneric classification presented by Pax & Hoffmann is based on that from Müller Argoviensis, except in the rank of subgeneric taxa. Moreover, they use series and section categories in an opposite way to Muller’s: the series are described as higher ranked than sections are. So they divide Acalypha into three subgenera: Linostachys, Androcephala and Euacalypha. The subgenus Androcephala, single-typed, includes a species from Madagascar with pedicellate female flowers and capituliform male inflorescences. They divide subgenus Linostachys into three sections, and subgenus Euacalypha into 8 series and 39 sections. Pax & Hoffmann consider as “sections” the lower category groups, which Müller designates by the symbol §. According to Grady Webster (1967), such “sections” from Pax & Hoffmann are comparable to subsections or series in other Euphorbiaceae genera. The last input on Acalypha from Pax & Hoffmann is published in Die Natürlichen Pflanzenfamilien by Engler & Prantl (Pax & Hoffmann 1931). It is just a synthesis of the treatment given in Das Pflanzenreich, where all species are classified and listed without any description or key.

In a general paper on Euphorbiaceae systematics, Isao Hurusawa (1954) sets forth a new classification, where the rank of infrageneric taxa is even raised and a proposal is made to divide Acalypha into seven subgenera with 19 sections. Grady Webster (1967), in a study of Euphorbiaceae genera from Southeastern USA, deems inadequate the treatments given by Pax & Hoffmann and Hurusawa; he thinks that by dividing genus into two sections with many infrasectional taxa, such as presented by Müller, the grade of kinship between Acalypha species seems to be better outlined. Accordingly, Webster compiles Acalypha species from the United States into ten series, which are based on corresponding “§” groups from Müller.

== Uses ==
A. hispida, the chenille plant or red-hot cat's tail, is cultivated as a houseplant for its interesting flowers. It earned the Royal Horticultural Society's Award of Garden Merit, as has A. hispaniolae, the Hispaniola cat's tail. Others are grown for their foliage and a number of cultivars have been developed, such as A. wilkesiana 'Obovata Cristata' and A. wilkesiana 'Hoffmannii'.

A. bipartita is eaten as a vegetable in some parts of Africa, and it is used in basketry and as animal fodder.

== Selected species ==
- Acalypha alopecuroidea – foxtail copperleaf
- Acalypha amentacea
- Acalypha arvensis – field copperleaf
- Acalypha australis – Australian acalypha, Asian copperleaf
- Acalypha berteroana – Guayama copperleaf
- Acalypha bipartita
- Acalypha bisetosa – streambank copperleaf
- Acalypha boinensis Leandri
- Acalypha brachystachya
- Acalypha californica – California copperleaf, Pringle three-seeded mercury
- Acalypha chamaedrifolia – bastard copperleaf
- Acalypha chlorocardia
- Acalypha chuniana
- Acalypha ciliata
- Acalypha costaricensis
- Acalypha cupricola
- Acalypha deamii – Deam's threeseed mercury
- Acalypha decaryana Leandri
- Acalypha dictyoneura
- Acalypha dikuluwensis (extinct)
- Acalypha diversifolia
- Acalypha ecuadorica
- Acalypha eggersii
- Acalypha eremorum
- Acalypha fruticosa
- Acalypha glabrata
- Acalypha gracilens – slender copperleaf
- Acalypha gummifera
- Acalypha herzogiana – dwarf chenille plant, red firetail, strawberry foxtail, trailing red cat's-tail
- Acalypha hispida – chenille plant, Philippine Medusa, red-hot cattail, bristly copperleaf
- Acalypha hontauyuensis
- Acalypha humbertii Leandri
- Acalypha indica– Indian acalypha, Indian-nettle
- Acalypha integrifolia
- Acalypha lamiana (Leandri) I.Montero & Cardiel
- Acalypha lancetillae
- Acalypha lepidopagensis Leandri
- Acalypha lepinei
- Acalypha leptopoda
- Acalypha linearifolia Leandri
- Acalypha macrostachya
- Acalypha menavody (Leandri) I.Montero & Cardiel
- Acalypha mexicana – Mexican copperleaf
- Acalypha monococca – slender threeseed mercury
- Acalypha monostachya – round copperleaf
- Acalypha mortoniana
- Acalypha neomexicana – New Mexico copperleaf
- Acalypha ornata
- Acalypha ostryifolia – hophornbeam copperleaf, pineland threeseed mercury
- Acalypha padifolia
- Acalypha pendula
- Acalypha perrieri Leandri
- Acalypha phleoides – shrubby copperleaf
- Acalypha poiretii – Poiret's copperleaf
- Acalypha polystachya
- Acalypha portoricensis – Puerto Rico copperleaf
- Acalypha psilostachya
- Acalypha radians – cardinal's feather
- Acalypha raivavensis
- Acalypha rhomboidea – common copperleaf, rhombic copperleaf
- Acalypha rubrinervis – St. Helena mountain bush, string tree, stringwood (extinct (c.1860))
- Acalypha setosa – Cuban copperleaf
- Acalypha siamensis – wild tea
- Acalypha skutchii
- Acalypha sonderiana
- Acalypha suirenbiensis
- Acalypha swallowensis
- Acalypha tunguraguae
- Acalypha umbrosa
- Acalypha villicaulis
- Acalypha villosa
- Acalypha virginica – Virginia copperleaf, mercuryweed, wax balls
- Acalypha wilderi (extinct)
- Acalypha wilkesiana – Copper plant, Beefsteakplant, Fire-dragon, Jacob's-coat, Match-me-if-you-can
