= Acalypha padifolia =

Conservation status
- Least Concern (IUCN 3.1)

Scientific classification
- Kingdom: Plantae
- Clade: Tracheophytes
- Clade: Angiosperms
- Clade: Eudicots
- Clade: Rosids
- Order: Malpighiales
- Family: Euphorbiaceae
- Subtribe: Acalyphinae
- Genus: Acalypha
- Species: A. padifolia

Binomial name
- Acalypha padifolia Kunth

Synonyms
- Acalypha andina Müll.Arg.; Acalypha coriifolia Pax & K.Hoffm.; Acalypha erythrostachya Müll.Arg.; Acalypha schimpffii Diels; Acalypha tunguraguae Pax & K.Hoffm.; Ricinocarpus erythrostachyus (Müll.Arg.) Kuntze; Ricinocarpus padifolius (Kunth) Kuntze

Species of plant

Acalypha padifolia is a species of flowering plant in the family Euphorbiaceae. It is native to the Andes in Bolivia, Colombia, Ecuador, and Peru. It is a shrub or small tree that grows in mountain rainforests.
