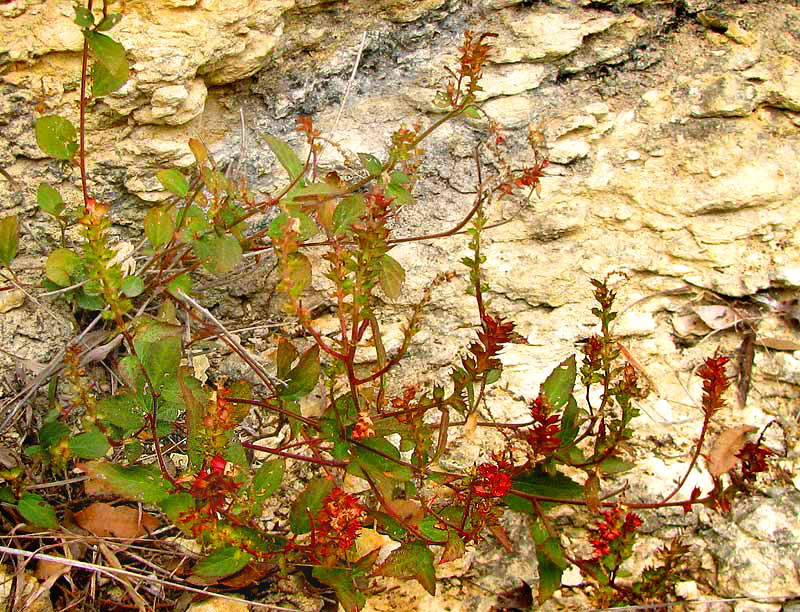
- Shrubby copperleaf on limestone cliff

Scientific classification
- Kingdom: Plantae
- Clade: Tracheophytes
- Clade: Angiosperms
- Clade: Eudicots
- Clade: Rosids
- Order: Malpighiales
- Family: Euphorbiaceae
- Genus: Acalypha
- Species: A. phleoides

Binomial name
- Acalypha phleoides Cav.

Synonyms
- List: Acalypha phleoides var genuina Müll.Arg.; Ricinocarpus phleoides (Cav.) Kuntze; Acalypha ehretiifolia Klotzsch ex Pax & K.Hoffm.; Acalypha hirta Cav.; Acalypha lindheimeri Müll.Arg.; Acalypha lindheimeri var. major Pax & K.Hoffm.; Acalypha pastoris Schrank; Acalypha pastoris DC. ex Willd.; Acalypha phleoides Torr.; Acalypha phleoides f. dioica McVaugh; Acalypha phleoides var. hirta (Cav.) Müll.Arg.; Acalypha prunifolia Kunth; Acalypha rubra Willd.; Ricinocarpus lindheimeri (Müll.Arg.) Kuntze

= Acalypha phleoides =

Species of plant

Acalypha phleoides, the shrubby copperleaf, sometimes called Lindheimer's copperleaf or a name applied to all Acalypha species, three-seeded mercury, is a species of flowering plant. A native of the southwestern USA, Mexico and Guatemala, it belongs to the family Euphorbiaceae.

== Description ==
Acalypha phleoides is a member of a large genus in a large family, so its general appearance is shared with quite a few species. Here are key features helping to distinguish Acalypha phleoides from its close relatives:

- It is a herbaceous and perennial plant with variously hairy stems up to 5 dm (19 1/2 in) long.
- Leaves with petioles up to 1 cm (1/2 in) long arise singly along stems. Blades up to 6 cm × 3 cm (2 1/2 in × 1 in) have sharp tips and saw-toothed to wavy-toothed margins.
- Slender, spike-like, inflorescences consist of unisexual flowers, with male flowers arranged at the top, and female ones lower down. Rarely, modified or "allomorphic" forms of female flowers replace all or part of the male ones.
- Male flowers bear 4-8 stamens. Female flowers, unlike the male, arise in the axis of conspicuous bracts up to 12 mm (1/2 in) long and nearly as wide, with up to 8 well-defined, sharp-pointed lobes. The bracts bear clearly visible stalked glands. The female flower's pistil normally has three compartments, or carpels, though allomorphic ones have only two. Styles are branched or irregularly jagged-looking.
- Capsular-type fruits are hairy and covered with tiny bumps. Seeds are up to 2 mm (1/16 in) long and covered with tiny pits.

== Distribution ==
Acalypha phleoides mainly occurs in Mexico, though in the Southwestern United States it is found in the states of Arizona, New Mexico and Texas, plus at Mexico's southern border it extends into Guatemala.

== Habitat ==
In the southwestern USA, Acalypha phleoides inhabits rocky areas, grasslands, and woodlands with oak, pine, and/or juniper at elevations between 100–2,600 m (330–8,530 ft). In the Tehuacán-Cuicatlán Valley in southeastern Mexico, it inhabits (treated as A. ostryifolia) tropical deciduous forests with deciduous leaves, at elevations of about 1,220 m (4,000 ft).

== In traditional medicine ==
Among the Otomí people of highland central Mexico's Tlaxcala state, where one of the local common names of Acalypha phleoides is hierba del cáncer ("cancer plant"), Acalypha phleoides is used to treat all kinds of skin problems (granos) as well as cuts. One or two large branches are boiled in a half liter of water (1 pint), set aside to cool, and the affected skin is washed with it. Elsewhere in Mexico,Acalypha phleoides is employed to treat a variety of gastrointestinal problems. In fact, in vivo and in vitro studies tend to support the plant's use as an antispasmodic agent.

== Taxonomy ==
In 1801 when Antonio José Cavanilles described and named Acalypha phleoides he wrote that his type specimen had been seen in a herbarium. It had been collected flowering in September, in the neighborhood of "Tixtala," in what is now Mexico. In the book's introduction he had stated that the mentioned herbarium was that of Luis Née. (page 128). Née had served as botanist during the Malaspina expedition, and the "Tixtala" mentioned certainly was the Tixtla in Mexico's Guerrero state, where in 1791 Née had collected plants.

In the USA, plants now recognized as Acalypha phleoides traditionally have been considered Acalypha lindheimeri and spoken of as Lindheimer's copperleaf. It is noted that plants of the taxon from Texas generally can be distinguished from those from south of central Mexico, but that between Texas and central Mexico plants are encountered with features intermediate the extremes.

Sometimes the name Acalypha phleoides is treated as a synonym of the similar Acalypha ostryifolia.

=== Etymology ===
The genus name Acalypha is based on the Greek akalephe, meaning "stinging nettle," referring to the general similarity of Acalypha to stinging nettles, though Acalypha species do not sting.

The species name phleoides has the Greek suffix -oides, which indicates a resemblance with something; in this case, the grass genus Phleum. The spike-like inflorescences of Acalypha phleoides are vaguely similar to the spike-like panicles of densely packed spikelets of Phleum species.

== Gallery ==
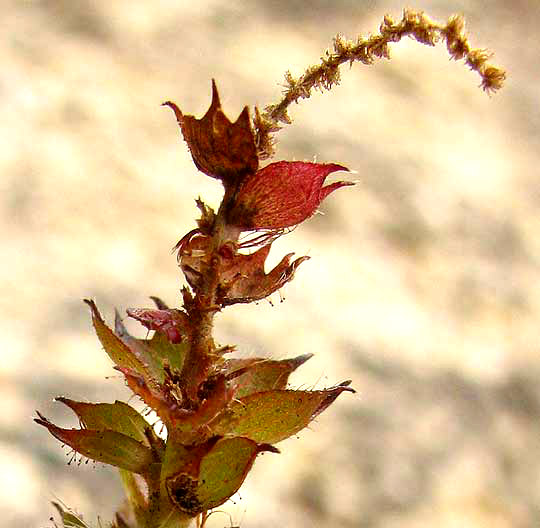
Inflorescence with male flowers above, female below

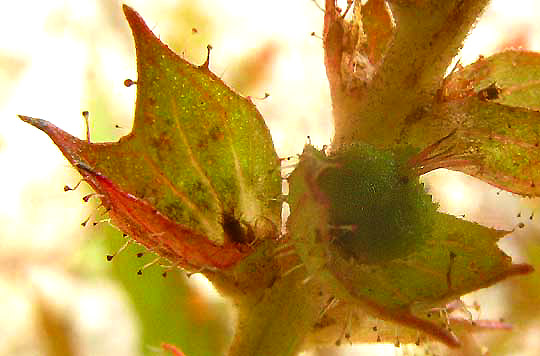
Female flowers with bracts and ovary with bumpy surface

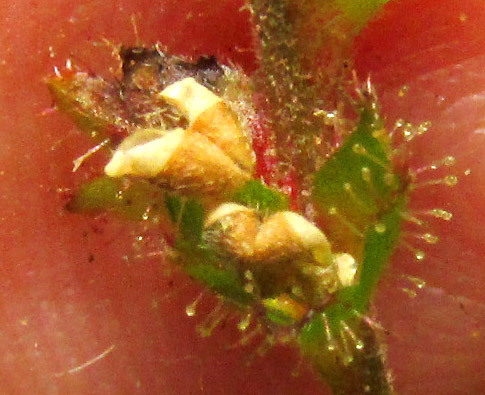
Split-open capsular fruits and bracts with stalked glands

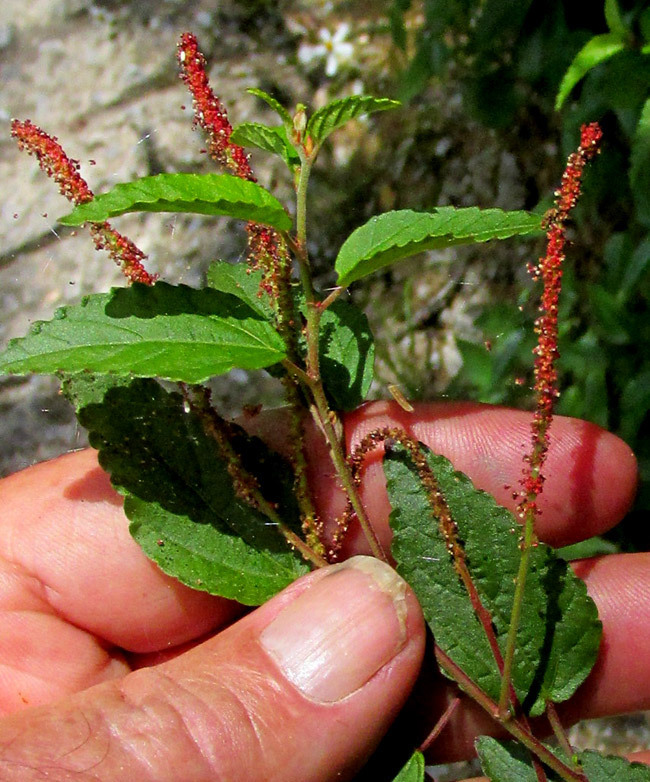
Inflorescences with all male flowers
