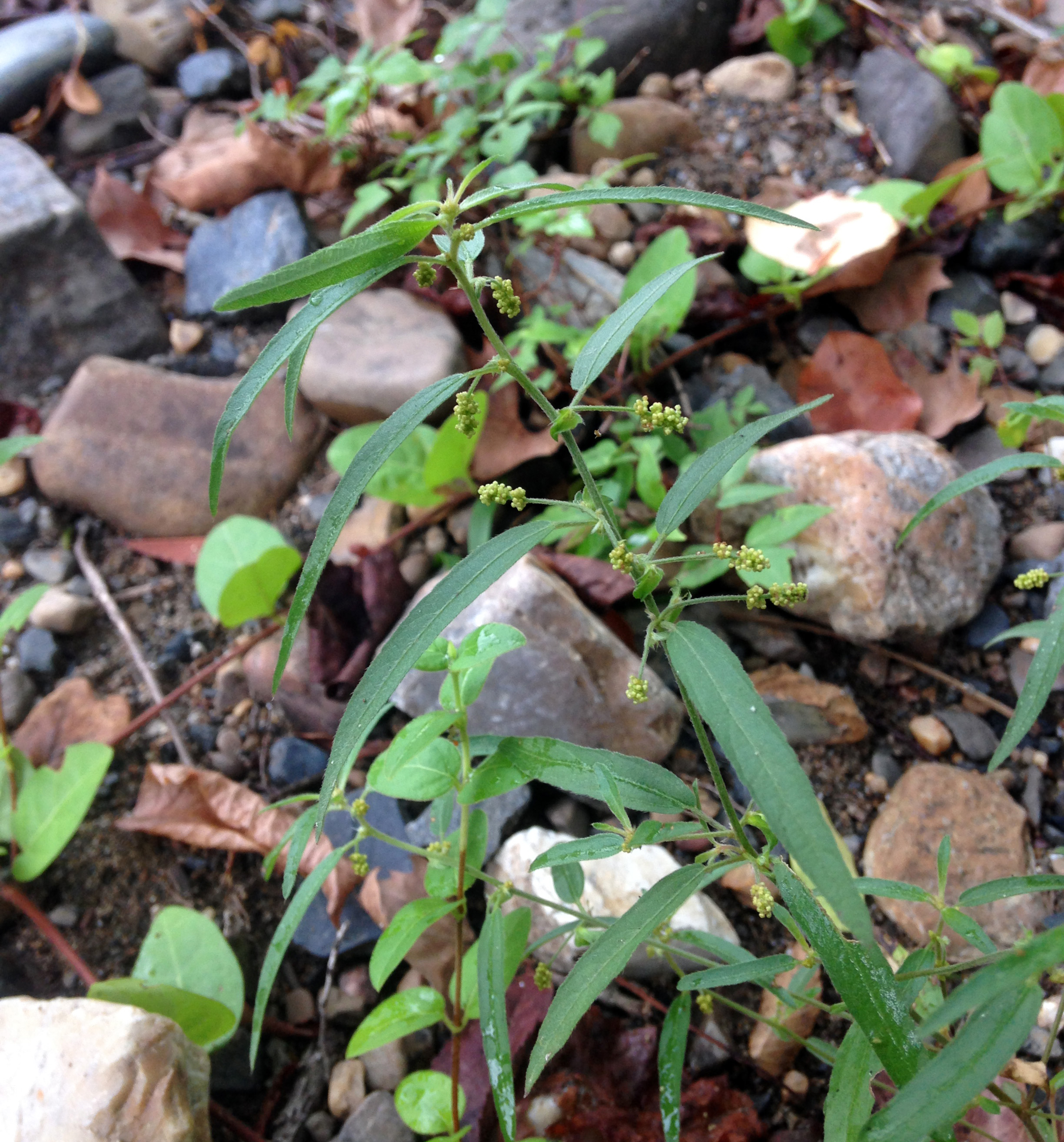

Conservation status
- Apparently Secure (NatureServe)

Scientific classification
- Kingdom: Plantae
- Clade: Tracheophytes
- Clade: Angiosperms
- Clade: Eudicots
- Clade: Rosids
- Order: Malpighiales
- Family: Euphorbiaceae
- Genus: Acalypha
- Species: A. monococca

Binomial name
- Acalypha monococca (Engelm. ex A.Gray) Lill. W. Mill. & Gandhi

= Acalypha monococca =

Species of flowering plant

Acalypha monococca, commonly called slender threeseed mercury, is a species of flowering plant in the spurge family (Euphorbiaceae). It is native to North America, where it is found in the South Central and Midwestern regions of the United States, primarily west of the Mississippi River. Its natural habitat is in dry, sunny, sandy or rocky areas, in prairies, barrens, or woodlands.

Acalypha monococca in an erect annual, growing to around 40 cm tall. Its flowers are produced from summer to fall. It is similar to Acalypha gracilens, which occupies a generally more easterly range from Acalypha monococca. Characteristic features for distinguishing Acalypha monococca include its single-seeded fruits, narrower leaves, smaller stature.
