= Acalypha lepinei =

Conservation status
- Vulnerable (IUCN 2.3)

Scientific classification
- Kingdom: Plantae
- Clade: Tracheophytes
- Clade: Angiosperms
- Clade: Eudicots
- Clade: Rosids
- Order: Malpighiales
- Family: Euphorbiaceae
- Subtribe: Acalyphinae
- Genus: Acalypha
- Species: A. lepinei

Binomial name
- Acalypha lepinei Müll.Arg. (1865)

Synonyms
- Ricinocarpus lepinei (Müll.Arg.) Kuntze (1891)

Species of flowering plant

Acalypha lepinei is a species of plant in the family Euphorbiaceae. It is a shrub or tree endemic to the Society Islands of French Polynesia, where it is native to the islands of Bora Bora, Raiatea, and Tahiti.
