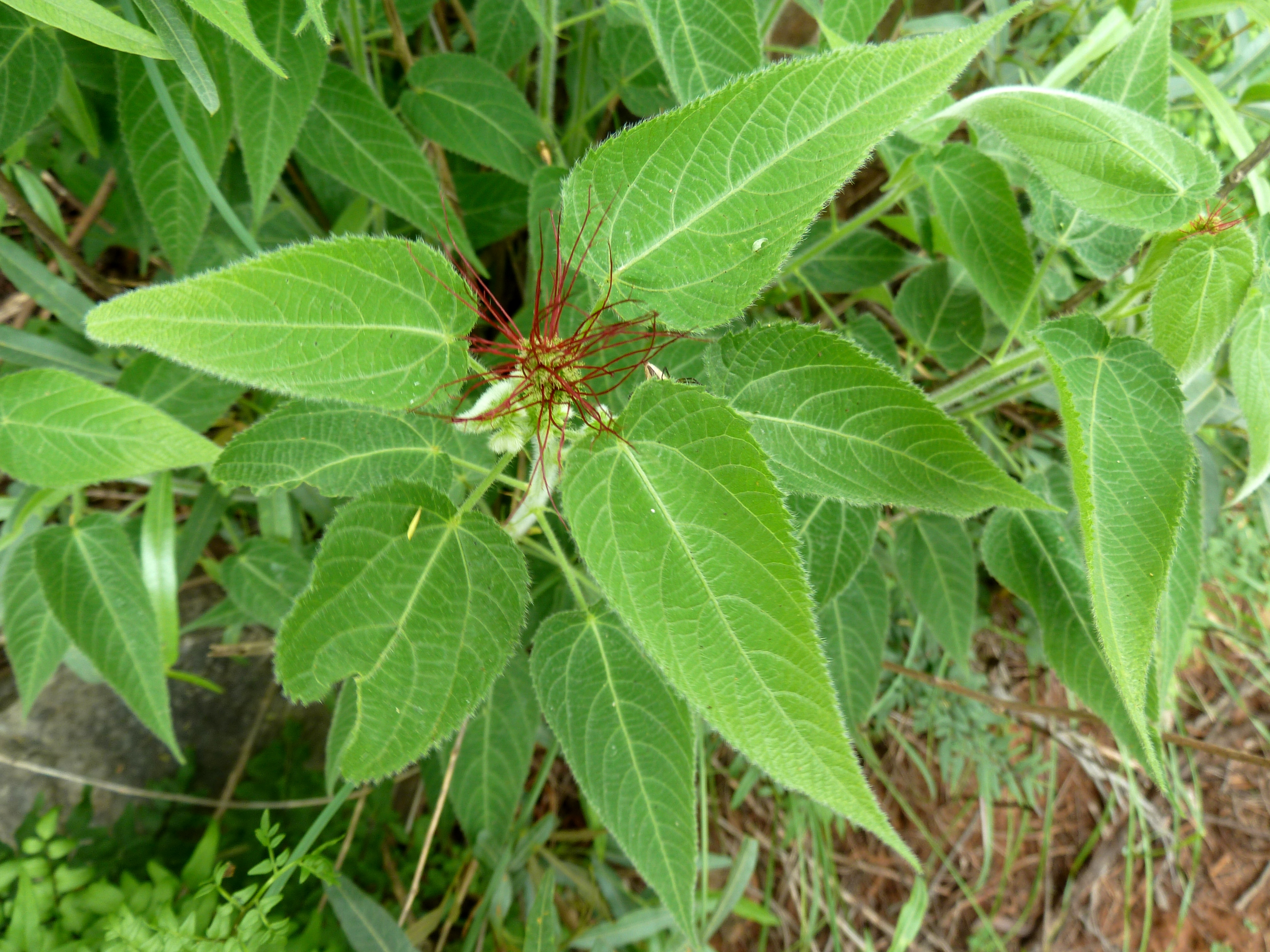

Scientific classification
- Kingdom: Plantae
- Clade: Tracheophytes
- Clade: Angiosperms
- Clade: Eudicots
- Clade: Rosids
- Order: Malpighiales
- Family: Euphorbiaceae
- Subtribe: Acalyphinae
- Genus: Acalypha
- Species: A. villicaulis

Binomial name
- Acalypha villicaulis Hochst. ex A.Rich.

= Acalypha villicaulis =

Species of flowering plant

Acalypha villicaulis is a species in the botanical family Euphorbiaceae. In tropical Africa it is widely used as a medicinal plant.

== Geographic distribution ==
Acalypha villicaulis occurs throughout tropical Africa, except humid central Africa.

== Synonyms ==
- Acalypha brachiata C.Krauss
- Acalypha petiolaris Hochst. ex C.Krauss
- Acalypha senensis Klotzsch
