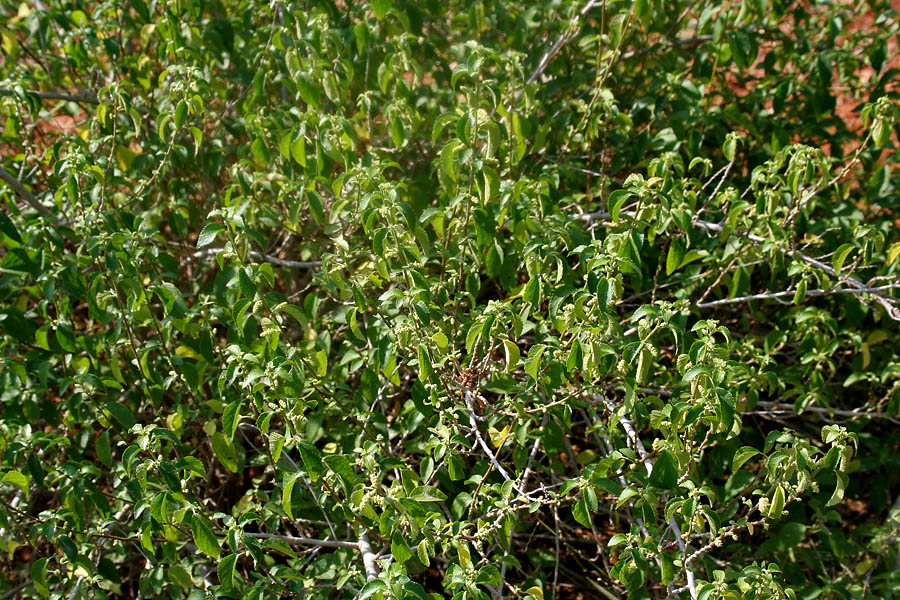

Scientific classification
- Kingdom: Plantae
- Clade: Tracheophytes
- Clade: Angiosperms
- Clade: Eudicots
- Clade: Rosids
- Order: Malpighiales
- Family: Euphorbiaceae
- Subtribe: Acalyphinae
- Genus: Acalypha
- Species: A. fruticosa

Binomial name
- Acalypha fruticosa Forssk.

= Acalypha fruticosa =

Species of flowering plant

Acalypha fruticosa is a species of flowering plant in the botanical family Euphorbiaceae. It occurs widely in East and southern Africa where it is eaten as a vegetable. It is also an important browse plant for sheep. In East Africa and southern Africa it is used as a medicinal plant. In northern Kenya, arrow shafts and beehive lids are made from the stem. From the dried leaves a tea is made in Ethiopia.

== Geographic distribution ==
Acalypha fruticosa occurs in East and parts of southern Africa, except humid central Africa. It also occurs in tropical Arabia, southern India, Sri Lanka and Myanmar.
