= Acalypha suirenbiensis =

Conservation status
- Vulnerable (IUCN 2.3)

Scientific classification
- Kingdom: Plantae
- Clade: Tracheophytes
- Clade: Angiosperms
- Clade: Eudicots
- Clade: Rosids
- Order: Malpighiales
- Family: Euphorbiaceae
- Subtribe: Acalyphinae
- Genus: Acalypha
- Species: A. suirenbiensis

Binomial name
- Acalypha suirenbiensis Yamamoto

Species of flowering plant

Acalypha suirenbiensis is a species of plant in the family Euphorbiaceae. It is endemic to Hualien County, Taiwan. The Flora of China, however, includes Acalypha hontauyuensis from Orchid Island in this species. It is a shrub growing about 3 m (10 ft) tall.

== Habitat and conservation ==
Acalypha suirenbiensis grows near the seashore in thickets, below 100 m (330 ft) asl. It is confined to a single location and is vulnerable to habitat loss.
