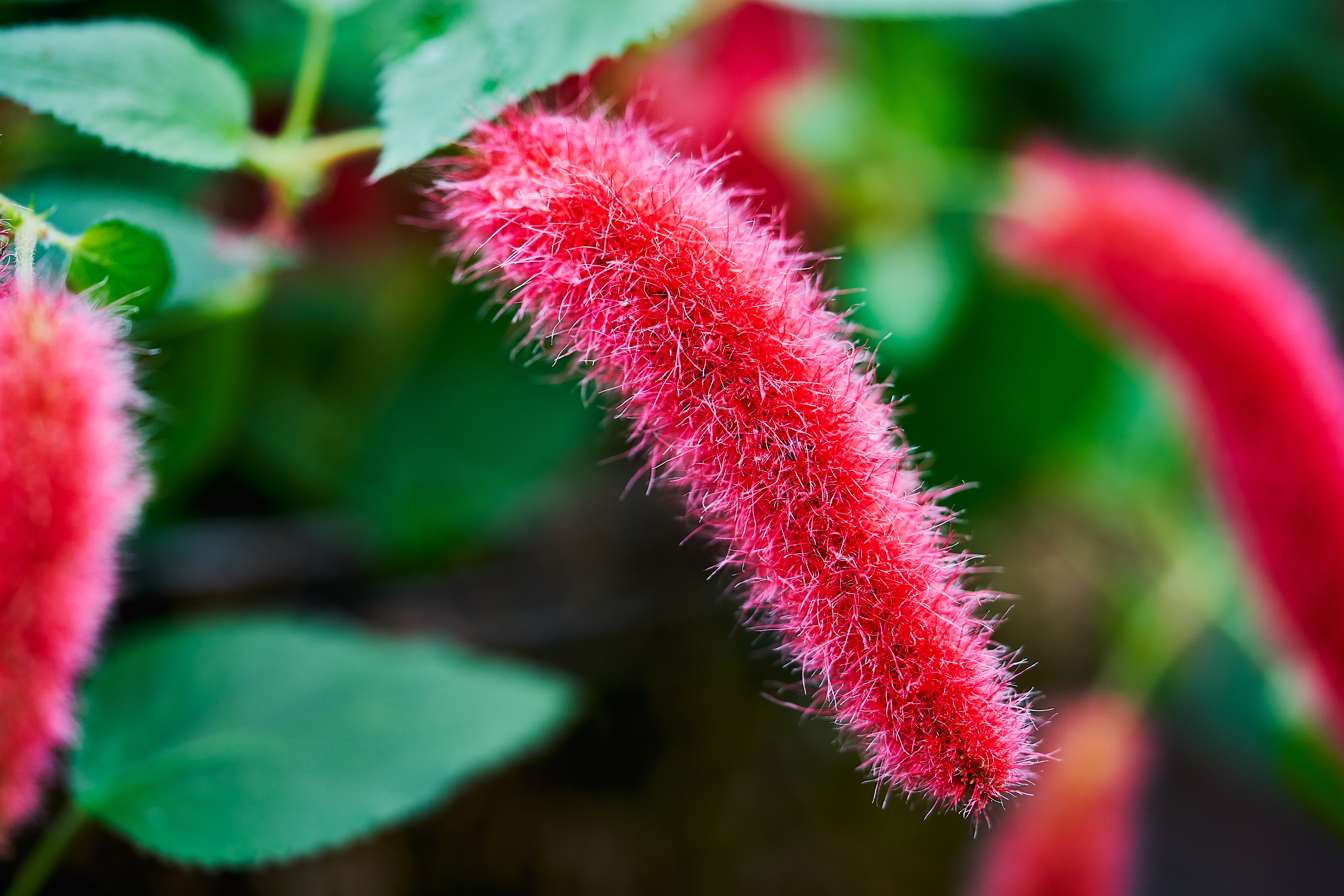
- Close-up of flowers
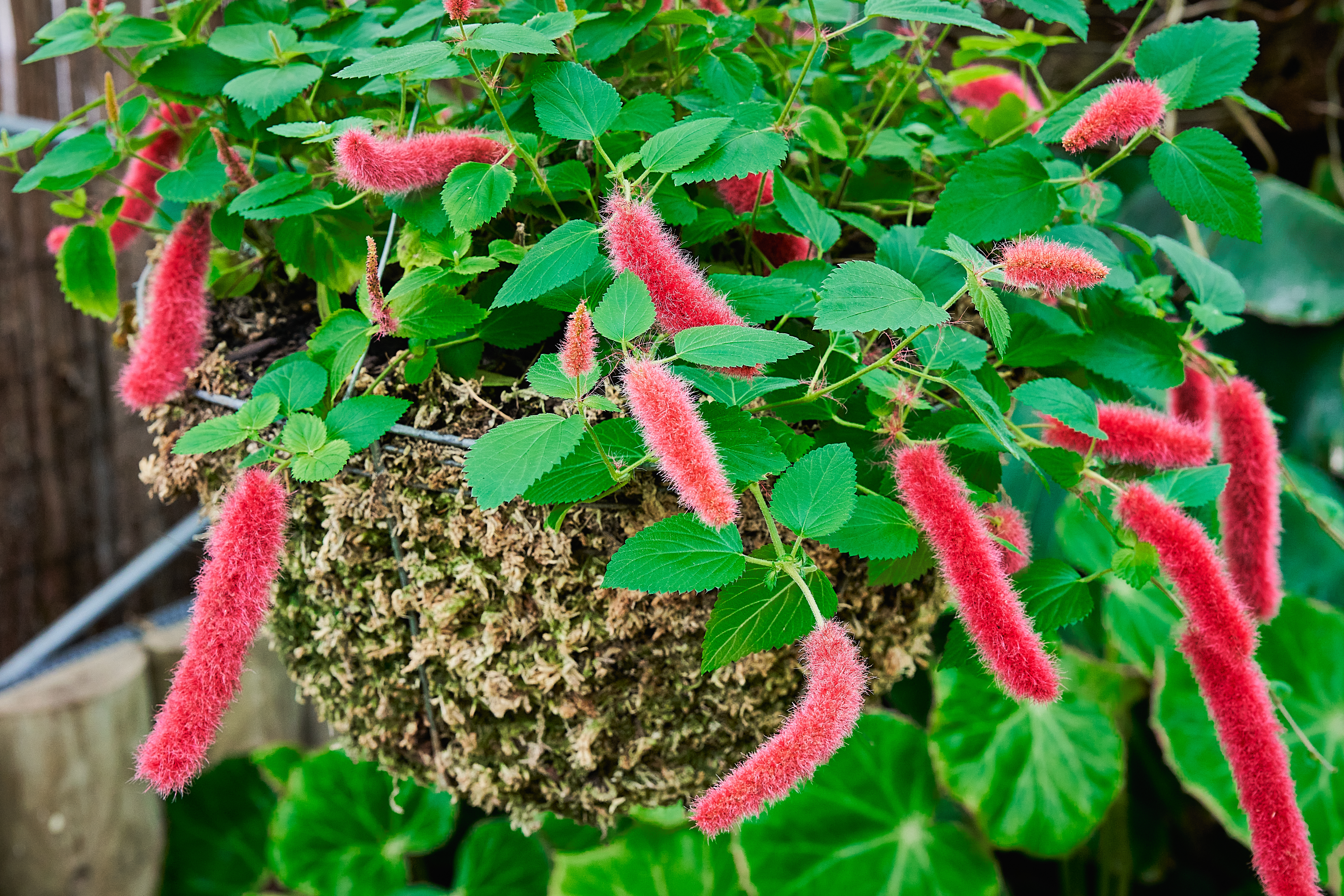
- In a hanging basket

Conservation status
- Apparently Secure (NatureServe)

Scientific classification
- Kingdom: Plantae
- Clade: Embryophytes
- Clade: Tracheophytes
- Clade: Angiosperms
- Clade: Eudicots
- Clade: Rosids
- Order: Malpighiales
- Family: Euphorbiaceae
- Genus: Acalypha
- Species: A. chamaedrifolia

Binomial name
- Acalypha chamaedrifolia (Lam.) Müll.Arg.

Synonyms
- List: Acalypha adscendens Hornem.; Acalypha chamaedrifolia var. brevipes (Müll.Arg.) Müll.Arg.; Acalypha chamaedrifolia var. genuina Müll.Arg.; Acalypha corchorifolia Willd.; Acalypha hispaniolae Urb.; Acalypha hotteana Urb.; Acalypha reptans Sw.; Acalypha reptans var. brevipes Müll.Arg.; Acalypha reptans var. genuina Müll.Arg.; Croton chamaedrifolius Lam.; Cupamenis chamedrifolia (Lam.) Raf.; Cupamenis reptans (Sw.) Raf.; Geiseleria chamaedryfolia (Lam.) Klotzsch; Ricinocarpus chamaedrifolius (Lam.) Kuntze

= Acalypha chamaedrifolia =

Species of flowering plant

Acalypha chamaedrifolia, the red cat's tail, is a species of flowering plant in the family Euphorbiaceae, native to southern Florida and the islands of the Caribbean. It performs best in a loam-less potting mixture. As its synonym Acalypha hispaniolae it gained the Royal Horticultural Society's Award of Garden Merit in 2002, but this seems to have been rescinded.
