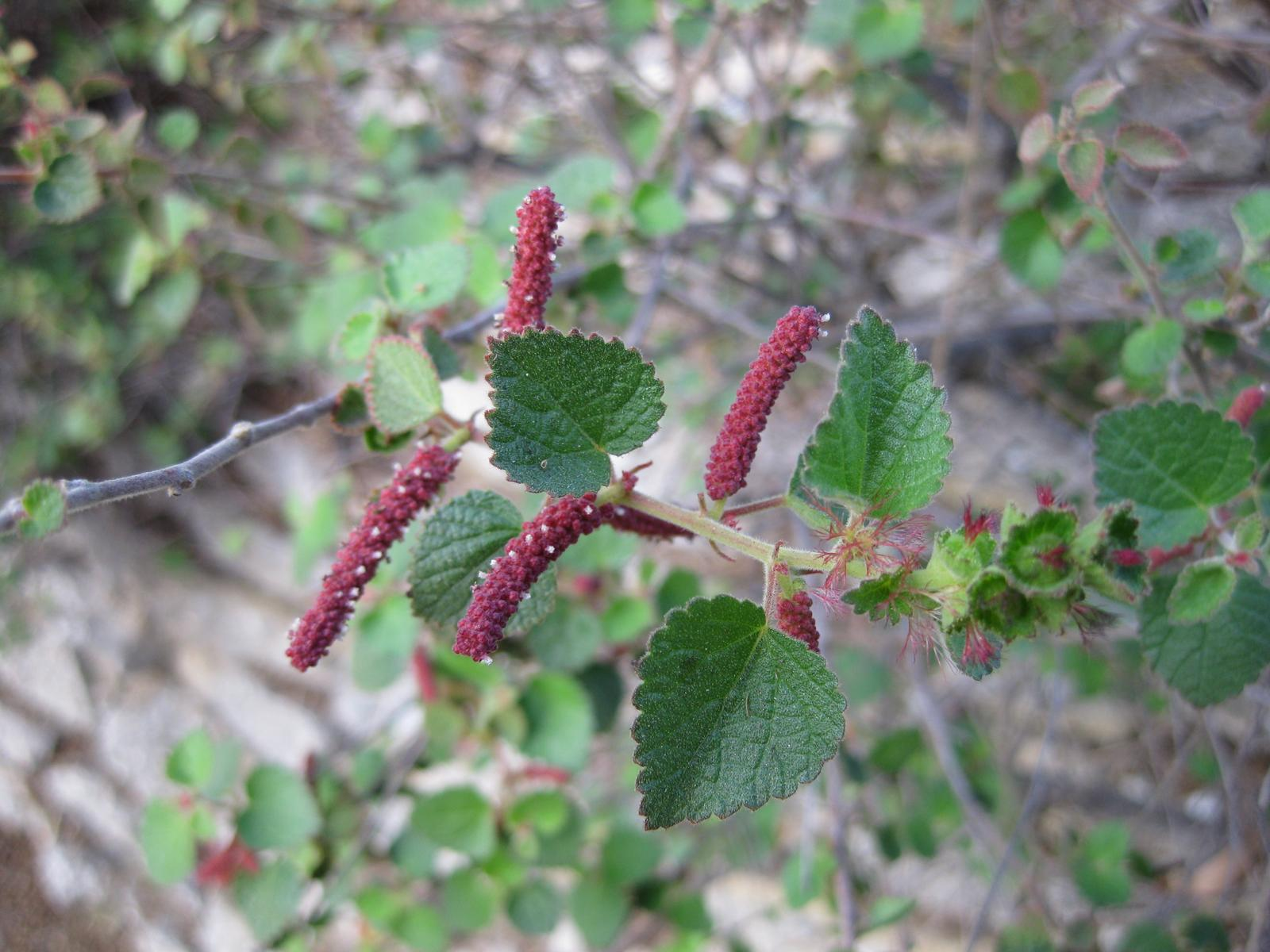

Conservation status
- Apparently Secure (NatureServe)

Scientific classification
- Kingdom: Plantae
- Clade: Tracheophytes
- Clade: Angiosperms
- Clade: Eudicots
- Clade: Rosids
- Order: Malpighiales
- Family: Euphorbiaceae
- Subtribe: Acalyphinae
- Genus: Acalypha
- Species: A. californica

Binomial name
- Acalypha californica (Benth.)

= Acalypha californica =

Species of flowering plant

The flowering shrub Acalypha californica is known as the California copperleaf, and sometimes by the older name Pringle three-seeded mercury. It is the only Acalypha species native to California, where it is most abundant in the hills of San Diego County. It is a member of the chaparral plant community.

The plant bears hairy, juicy, toothed leaves which despite the plant's common name are light green, never copper in color. Each flower is made up of a staminate part, which appears as a long spike of tiny red and pink bracts, and a pistillate part at the base of the spike, which is a cup made up of green bracts bearing the ovary.

== Taxonomy ==
Acalypha californica was scientifically described and named in 1844 by George Bentham. The specimens he described were collected from Magdalena Bay in November 1837 during a voyage of HMS Sulphur under the command of Edward Belcher. It is classified in the genus Acalypha within the Euphorbiaceae family. The species has no subspecies and has three synonyms.

Table of Synonyms
Name	Year	Notes
Acalypha pringlei S.Watson	1885	= het.
Acalypha stokesiae Pax & K.Hoffm.	1924	= het.
Ricinocarpus californicus (Benth.) Kuntze	1891	≡ hom.
Notes: ≡ homotypic synonym ; = heterotypic synonym

== Range and habitat ==
California copperleaf is native to the southwestern United States and northern Mexico. In California it grows in just two southern counties, Orange and San Diego counties, while in Arizona it is found in just Pima County. It is native to all four states of northwestern Mexico, Baja California, Baja California Sur, Sonora, and Sinaloa.
