= Acalypha swallowensis =

Scientific classification
- Kingdom: Plantae
- Clade: Tracheophytes
- Clade: Angiosperms
- Clade: Eudicots
- Clade: Rosids
- Order: Malpighiales
- Family: Euphorbiaceae
- Genus: Acalypha
- Species: A. swallowensis

Binomial name
- Acalypha swallowensis Fosberg

Species of flowering plant

Acalypha swallowensis is a species of flowering plant in the family Euphorbiaceae, native to the Santa Cruz Islands in the Pacific Ocean.
