= Acalypha cupricola =

Conservation status
- Near Threatened (IUCN 3.1)

Scientific classification
- Kingdom: Plantae
- Clade: Tracheophytes
- Clade: Angiosperms
- Clade: Eudicots
- Clade: Rosids
- Order: Malpighiales
- Family: Euphorbiaceae
- Subtribe: Acalyphinae
- Genus: Acalypha
- Species: A. cupricola

Binomial name
- Acalypha cupricola Robyns ex G.A. Levin

Species of flowering plant

Acalypha cupricola is a species of spurge native to the copper-rich soils of Katanga Province in the Democratic Republic of the Congo. It is an absolute metallophyte, restricted to steppic savanna in copper outcrops. Surface mining is destroying some of its habitat, but it is not considered to be fragmented, and so is listed as Near Threatened by the IUCN. It can also be found growing in other metalliferous habitats, such as mine debris and lands disturbed by mining. This species is a candidate for use in phytoremediation of metal-contaminated sites.
