= Acalypha dikuluwensis =

Conservation status
- Extinct (1959?) (IUCN 3.1)

Scientific classification
- Kingdom: Plantae
- Clade: Tracheophytes
- Clade: Angiosperms
- Clade: Eudicots
- Clade: Rosids
- Order: Malpighiales
- Family: Euphorbiaceae
- Genus: Acalypha
- Species: †A. dikuluwensis

Binomial name
- †Acalypha dikuluwensis P.A.Duvign. & Dewit
- Katanga Province, D.R. Congo

Species of flowering plant

Acalypha dikuluwensis was a 25 centimetres (9.8 in) high tropical flowering plant in the genus Acalypha of the family Euphorbiaceae. The IUCN Red List of Threatened Species declared the plant extinct in 2012. A. dikuluwensis was endemic to copper-rich soils of eastern Katanga Province of the Democratic Republic of the Congo, and was only found around Dikuluwe. The soils are derived from Katanga Supergroup Upper Cambrian Roan Group rocks. It was restricted to steppic savanna in copper outcrops, which were destroyed by surface mining. No specimens were found after 1959.
