= Acalypha ornata =

Scientific classification
- Kingdom: Plantae
- Clade: Tracheophytes
- Clade: Angiosperms
- Clade: Eudicots
- Clade: Rosids
- Order: Malpighiales
- Family: Euphorbiaceae
- Subtribe: Acalyphinae
- Genus: Acalypha
- Species: A. ornata

Binomial name
- Acalypha ornata Hochst. ex A.Rich.

Species of flowering plant

Acalypha ornata is a species in the botanical family Euphorbiaceae. In Africa it is widely used as a medicinal plant. The stems are used as fibres for weaving baskets. The leaves are eaten as a vegetable; the plants are also fed to domestic animals. Acalypha ornata is sometimes planted as an ornamental plant.

== Geographic distribution ==
Acalypha ornata occurs throughout tropical Africa, except most of West Africa and humid central Africa.
