= Acalypha bipartita =

Scientific classification
- Kingdom: Plantae
- Clade: Tracheophytes
- Clade: Angiosperms
- Clade: Eudicots
- Clade: Rosids
- Order: Malpighiales
- Family: Euphorbiaceae
- Subtribe: Acalyphinae
- Genus: Acalypha
- Species: A. bipartita

Binomial name
- Acalypha bipartita (Müll.Arg.)

Species of flowering plant

Acalypha bipartita is a species in the botanical family Euphorbiaceae. It occurs widely in Africa where it is eaten as a vegetable, or fed to animals. The leaves are considered nutritious, as they contain a high concentration of calcium. It is often found as undergrowth in the forest, on the edges of the forest, and in wooded grasslands, particularly in Sudan, Uganda, Kenya, eastern Zaire, Burundi, Rwanda, and Tanzania. The stems are often used in making baskets.

== Description ==
A. bipartita is a climbing shrub, often about 3 meters tall, with light brown bark. Its leaves are broad and ovate, with serrated edges and pubescent undersides. The plant produces 4–8 cm spikes of tiny red flowers, which give way to three-capsuled seeds.
