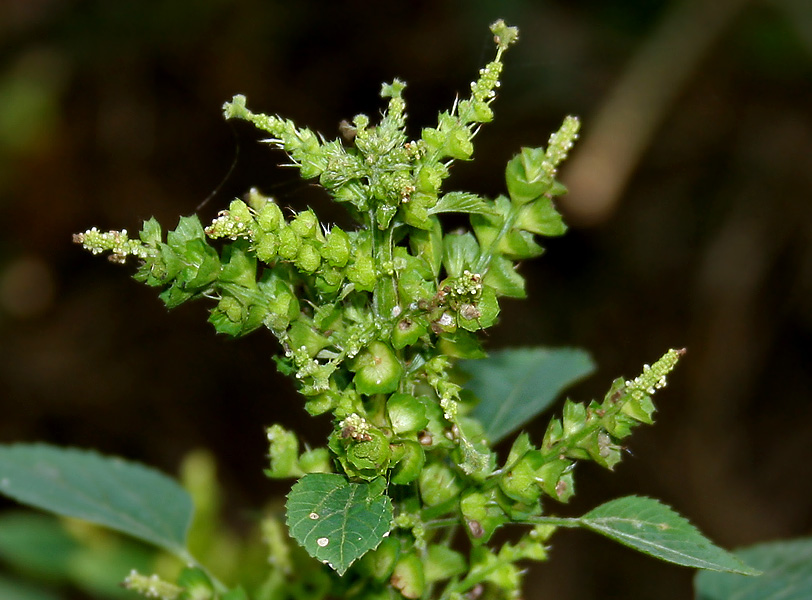

Scientific classification
- Kingdom: Plantae
- Clade: Tracheophytes
- Clade: Angiosperms
- Clade: Eudicots
- Clade: Rosids
- Order: Malpighiales
- Family: Euphorbiaceae
- Subtribe: Acalyphinae
- Genus: Acalypha
- Species: A. ciliata

Binomial name
- Acalypha ciliata Forssk.

= Acalypha ciliata =

Species of flowering plant

Acalypha ciliata is a species in the botanical family Euphorbiaceae. It occurs widely in Africa where it is eaten as a vegetable, or fed to animals. In West Africa and East Africa it is used as a medicinal plant.

== Geographic distribution ==
Acalypha ciliata occurs throughout tropical Africa, except central Africa. It also occurs in tropical Arabia, Pakistan, India and Sri Lanka.
