= Acalypha dictyoneura =

Conservation status
- Near Threatened (IUCN 3.1)

Scientific classification
- Kingdom: Plantae
- Clade: Tracheophytes
- Clade: Angiosperms
- Clade: Eudicots
- Clade: Rosids
- Order: Malpighiales
- Family: Euphorbiaceae
- Subtribe: Acalyphinae
- Genus: Acalypha
- Species: A. dictyoneura

Binomial name
- Acalypha dictyoneura Müll.Arg.

Species of flowering plant

Acalypha dictyoneura is a species of flowering plant in the family Euphorbiaceae. It is endemic to Ecuador, where it grows in the cloud forests of the Andes. There are six known populations.
