= Acalypha wilderi =

Conservation status
- Extinct (yes) (IUCN 3.1)

Scientific classification
- Kingdom: Plantae
- Clade: Tracheophytes
- Clade: Angiosperms
- Clade: Eudicots
- Clade: Rosids
- Order: Malpighiales
- Family: Euphorbiaceae
- Subtribe: Acalyphinae
- Genus: Acalypha
- Species: †A. wilderi

Binomial name
- †Acalypha wilderi Merr.

Extinct species of flowering plant

Acalypha wilderi was a species of spurge that was only known from forested habitats along the northern and western sides of Rarotonga in the Cook Islands, at elevations of 200–300 m. Very little is known about this species, but collections suggest it was a small shrub rarely exceeding 2 m in height. Its habitat has been greatly modified for agriculture, roads, housing, plantations and invasive species, and has not been seen since 1929, and was declared extinct in 2014. This species may be synonymous with A. raivavensis and A. tubuaiensis.

The reason for its extinction is unknown.
