= Acalypha hontauyuensis =

Conservation status
- Vulnerable (IUCN 2.3)

Scientific classification
- Kingdom: Plantae
- Clade: Tracheophytes
- Clade: Angiosperms
- Clade: Eudicots
- Clade: Rosids
- Order: Malpighiales
- Family: Euphorbiaceae
- Subtribe: Acalyphinae
- Genus: Acalypha
- Species: A. hontauyuensis

Binomial name
- Acalypha hontauyuensis Keng

Species of flowering plant

Acalypha hontauyuensis is a species of plant in the family Euphorbiaceae. It is a shrub endemic to Orchid Island, Taiwan. The Flora of China, however, lists it as a synonym of Acalypha suirenbiensis from the Taiwanese mainland.

== Habitat and conservation ==
Acalypha hontauyuensis grows in dry scrub. It is locally abundant but vulnerable to habitat loss.
