= Acalypha tunguraguae =

Conservation status
- Vulnerable (IUCN 3.1)

Scientific classification
- Kingdom: Plantae
- Clade: Tracheophytes
- Clade: Angiosperms
- Clade: Eudicots
- Clade: Rosids
- Order: Malpighiales
- Family: Euphorbiaceae
- Subtribe: Acalyphinae
- Genus: Acalypha
- Species: A. tunguraguae

Binomial name
- Acalypha tunguraguae Pax & Hoffm.

Species of flowering plant

Acalypha tunguraguae is a species of plant in the family Euphorbiaceae. It is endemic to Ecuador. Its natural habitat is subtropical or tropical moist montane forests.
