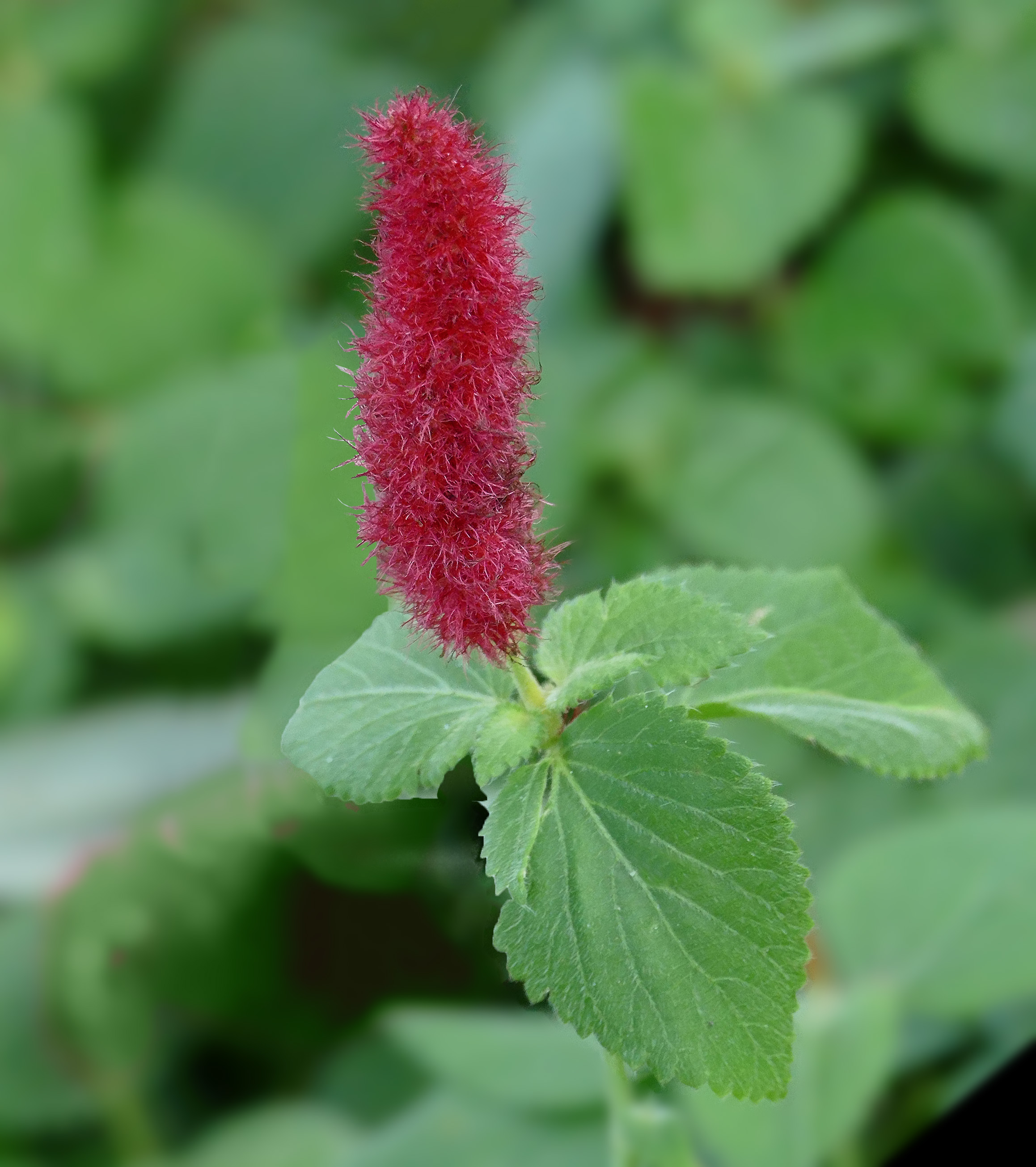

Scientific classification
- Kingdom: Plantae
- Clade: Tracheophytes
- Clade: Angiosperms
- Clade: Eudicots
- Clade: Rosids
- Order: Malpighiales
- Family: Euphorbiaceae
- Genus: Acalypha
- Species: A. pendula

Binomial name
- Acalypha pendula C.Wright ex Griseb.

Synonyms
- Acalypha chamaedrifolia var. pendula (C.Wright ex Griseb.) Müll.Arg.

= Acalypha pendula =

Species of plant

Acalypha pendula is a species of subshrub. Native to Cuba, Haiti, and the Dominican Republic. It is a dioecious species.

== Common names ==
In English, the species goes by the common names firetail chenille plant, dwarf chenille, or strawberry firetails.
