= Acalypha eggersii =

Conservation status
- Critically Endangered (IUCN 3.1)

Scientific classification
- Kingdom: Plantae
- Clade: Tracheophytes
- Clade: Angiosperms
- Clade: Eudicots
- Clade: Rosids
- Order: Malpighiales
- Family: Euphorbiaceae
- Subtribe: Acalyphinae
- Genus: Acalypha
- Species: A. eggersii

Binomial name
- Acalypha eggersii Pax & K.Hoffm.

Species of flowering plant

Acalypha eggersii is a species of plant in the family Euphorbiaceae. It is endemic to Ecuador. Its natural habitat is subtropical or tropical dry forests.

== Sources ==
- Santiana, J.; Cerón, C. & Pitman, N. (2004). "Acalypha eggersii". IUCN Red List of Threatened Species. 2004 e.T45174A10984373. doi:10.2305/IUCN.UK.2004.RLTS.T45174A10984373.en.
