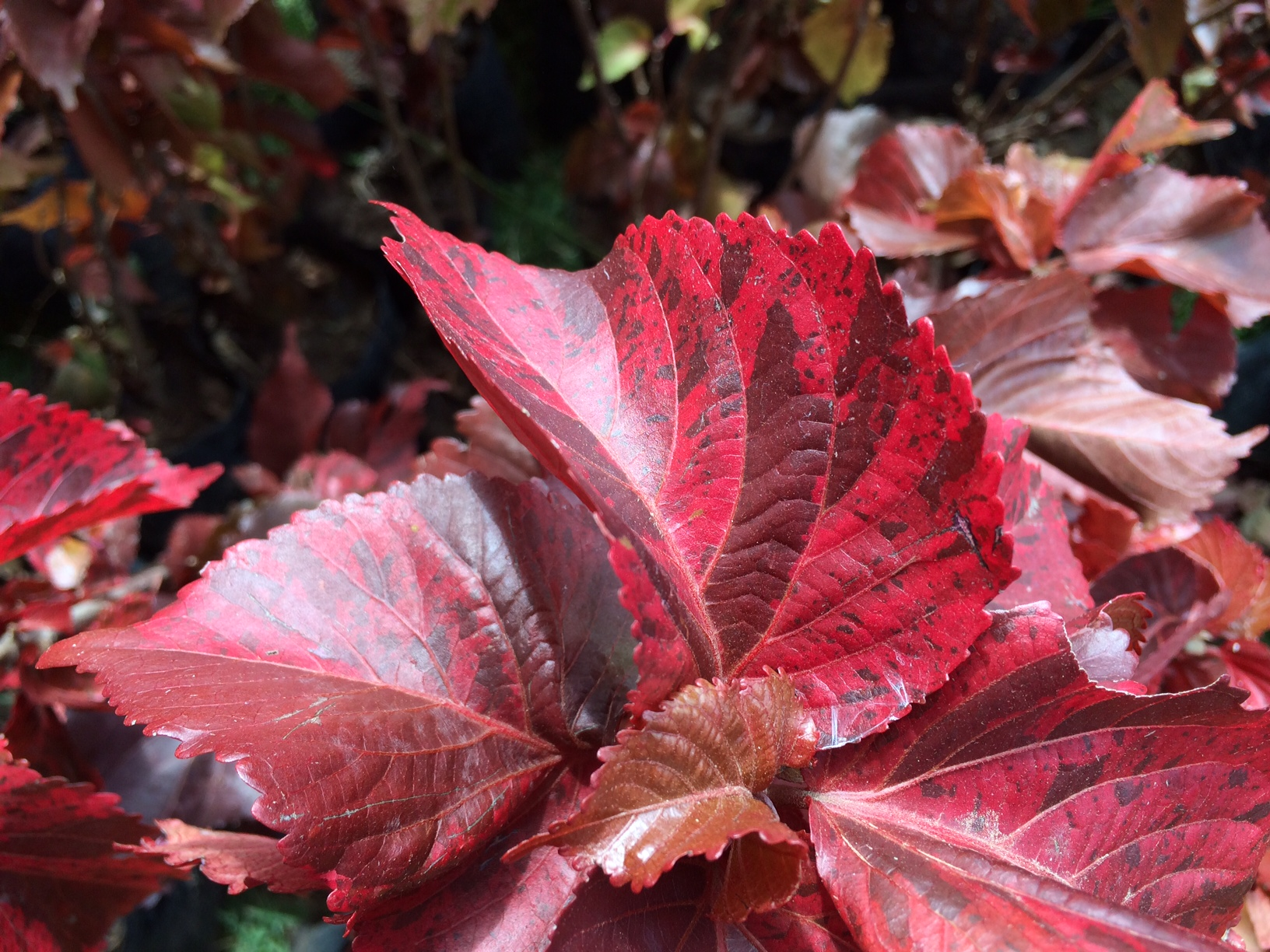

Conservation status
- Least Concern (IUCN 3.1)

Scientific classification
- Kingdom: Plantae
- Clade: Embryophytes
- Clade: Tracheophytes
- Clade: Spermatophytes
- Clade: Angiosperms
- Clade: Eudicots
- Clade: Rosids
- Order: Malpighiales
- Family: Euphorbiaceae
- Genus: Acalypha
- Species: A. wilkesiana

Binomial name
- Acalypha wilkesiana Müll.Arg.

= Acalypha wilkesiana =

Species of flowering plant

Acalypha wilkesiana, common names copperleaf, Jacob's coat and Flamengueira, is an evergreen shrub growing to 3 metres (9.8 ft) high and 2 metres (6 ft 7 in) across. It has a closely arranged crown, with an erect stem and many branches. Both the branches and the leaves are covered in fine hairs. The leaves, which may be flat or crinkled, are large and broad with teeth around the edge. They can be 10–20 centimetres (3.9–7.9 in) long and 15 centimetres (5.9 in) wide. The leaves are coppery green with red splashes, giving them a mottled appearance. Separate male and female flowers appear on the same plant. The male flowers are in long spikes which hang downwards while the female flowers are in short spikes. The latter do not show up easily as they are often hidden among the leaves. The flower stalks are 10–20 cm long.

== Distribution ==
A. wilkesiana is a tropical and subtropical plant which grows naturally in Vanuatu and occurs in the Pacific Islands. It prefers light well drained soil and is suited to a protected shady position. It can be damaged by both drought and frost. It needs a minimum temperature above 10 °C (50 °F). It is best suited to hardiness zones 10-12.

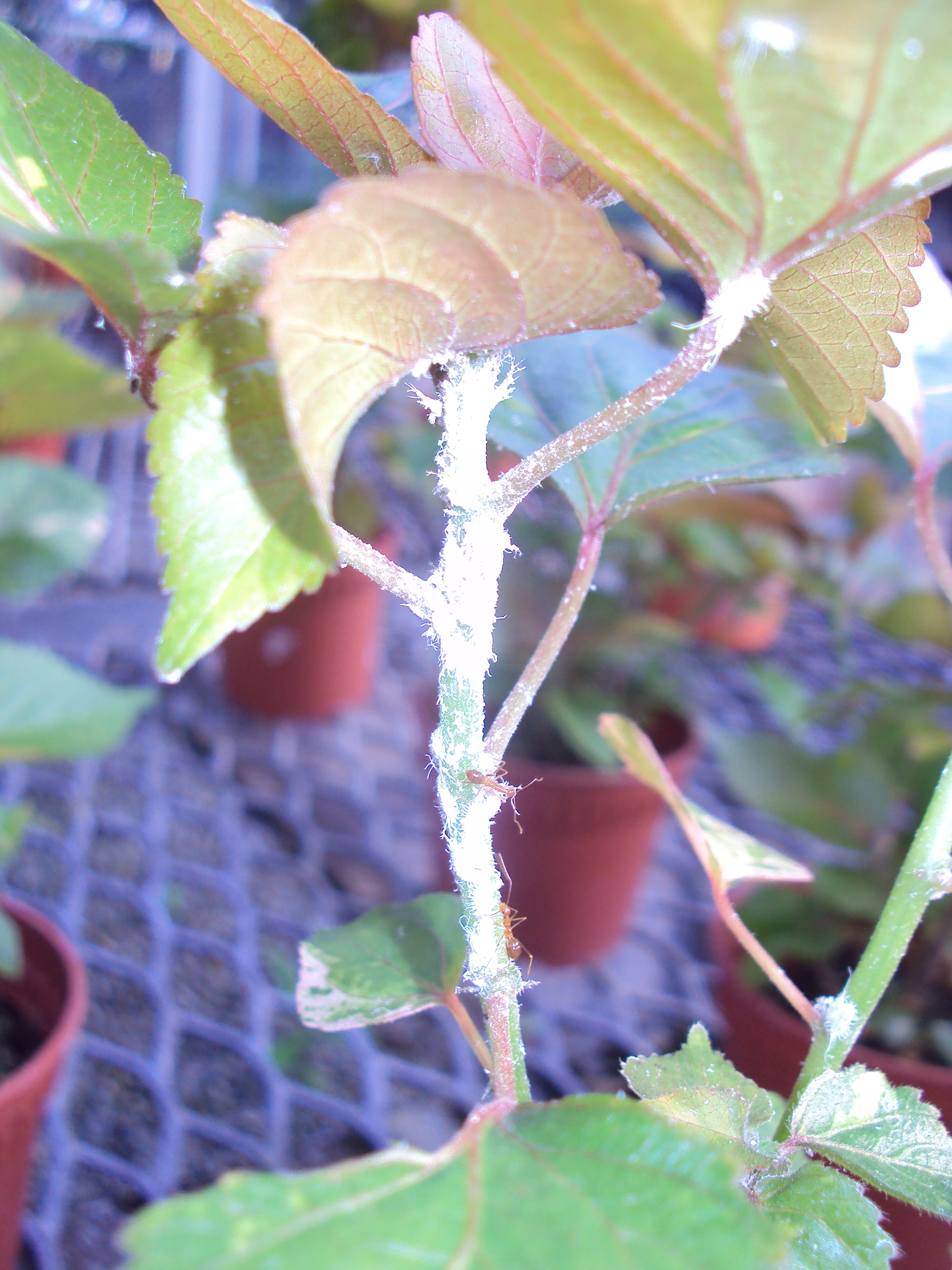
Mealy bugs on Acalypha wilkesiana

== Cultivation ==
In South Florida and tropical America, copperleaf is a popular outdoor plant that provides colour throughout the year. It is used in mixed hedges and shrub borders and as a specimen shrub. Elsewhere copperleaf is grown as an annual where its spectacular foliage replaces flowers from late summer until frost. Copperleaf is also grown indoors as a container plant. However, it must be maintained in a warm, humid, bright environment.

=== Light ===
The plant does fine in partial shade or sun. It prefers a position sheltered from strong winds, and a fertile, organic soil. Indoor plants do well in medium light, but leaf colour develops best on plants kept in bright light.

=== Moisture ===
Outdoors, copperleaf does best in rich, moist, but fast-draining soil. Indoor plants do better in a soilless potting mix, with the medium constantly moist, but not saturated. Daily misting is recommended for indoor plants with only spare watering in winter.

=== Hardiness ===
Copperleaf is suited to USDA Zones 10-11. Although growing best in USDA Zones 10-11, copperleaf seems to have been established in Zone 9a in Central Florida. Indoor plants should be kept above 55 °F (13 °C). Copperleaf can also be grown annually.

=== Propagation ===
Propagation can be done by stem cuttings at any time of year, using bottom heat.

=== Diseases ===
The plant is susceptible to mealy bug infection, which can result in growth retardation and also cause high fungal contaminations in in vitro studies. To reduce the mealy bug's infection, 90% ethanol can be directly applied to the infestations using paint brushes.

== Medicinal value ==
Acalypha wilkesiana ointment is used to treat fungal skin diseases. Oyelami et al. (2003) carried out a non-comparative study to evaluate the safety and efficiency of Acalypha wilkesiana ointment using 32 Nigerians with mycological as well as clinical evidence of mycoses. The ointment successfully controlled the mycoses in 73.3% of the affected patients.

It was very effective in treating Pityriasis versicolor, Tinea pedia and Candida intertrigo, with 100% cure. Oyelami et al. (2003) concluded that Acalypha wilkesiana ointment can be used to treat superficial mycoses. Akinyemi et al. (2005) evaluated crude extracts from six important medicinal plants, namely Phylantus discoideus, Ageratum conyzoides, Terminalia avicennioides, Bridella ferruginea, Acalypha wilkesiana and Ocimum gratissimum, to find activity against Methicillin-resistant Staphylococcus aureus (MRSA. Water and ethanolic extracts of these plants were obtained locally. MRSA strains isolated from patients were used. Both ethanolic and water extracts showed effects on MRSA. Minimum bactericidal concentration (MBC) and minimum inhibition concentration (MIC) of these plants ranged from 30.4-37.0 μg/ml and 18.2-24.0 μg/ml respectively. A high MBS value was found in two plants and the other four contained traceable amounts of anthraquinones. This study provided scientific support for the use of Acalypha wilkesiana, T. avicennioides, O. gratissimum and P. discoidens against MRSA based diseases. A. conyzoides and B. ferruginea were unresponsive against the MRSA strains.

== Features ==
This plant has foliage that is more colourful than many flowers. Other names for Acalypha wilkesiana include A. amentacea and A. tricolor. There is another popular member of the genus Acalypha that is grown in South Florida and in greenhouses and conservatories as well. It is the red-hot-cattail (A. hispida) that is grown for its long brightly coloured, fuzzy catkins.

== Other details ==
=== Distribution ===
Dominica, Zimbabwe, Botswana, South Africa, Zambia, Asia, Australia, The Bahamas, Bermuda, Brazil, Fiji, Hawaii, Indochina, Indonesia, Kenya, Malaysia, Nigeria, Norfolk Island, Pacific, Pakistan, Papua New Guinea, PNG, Polynesia, Tanzania, Thailand, Tonga, Uganda, USA, Vanuatu, Vietnam.

=== Synonyms ===
Acalypha tricolor; Acalypha amentacea Roxb. var. wilkesiana (Muell. Arg.) Fosberg.

=== Other name ===
Flamengueira, Fijian fire plant, Fire Dragon Plant, Beefsteak Plant, Hu-ling, Redleaf, Joseph's coat, Hoja de Cobre, Huu-krataai, Tai tuong, Mexican payasito, Match-Me-If-You-Can

== Gallery ==
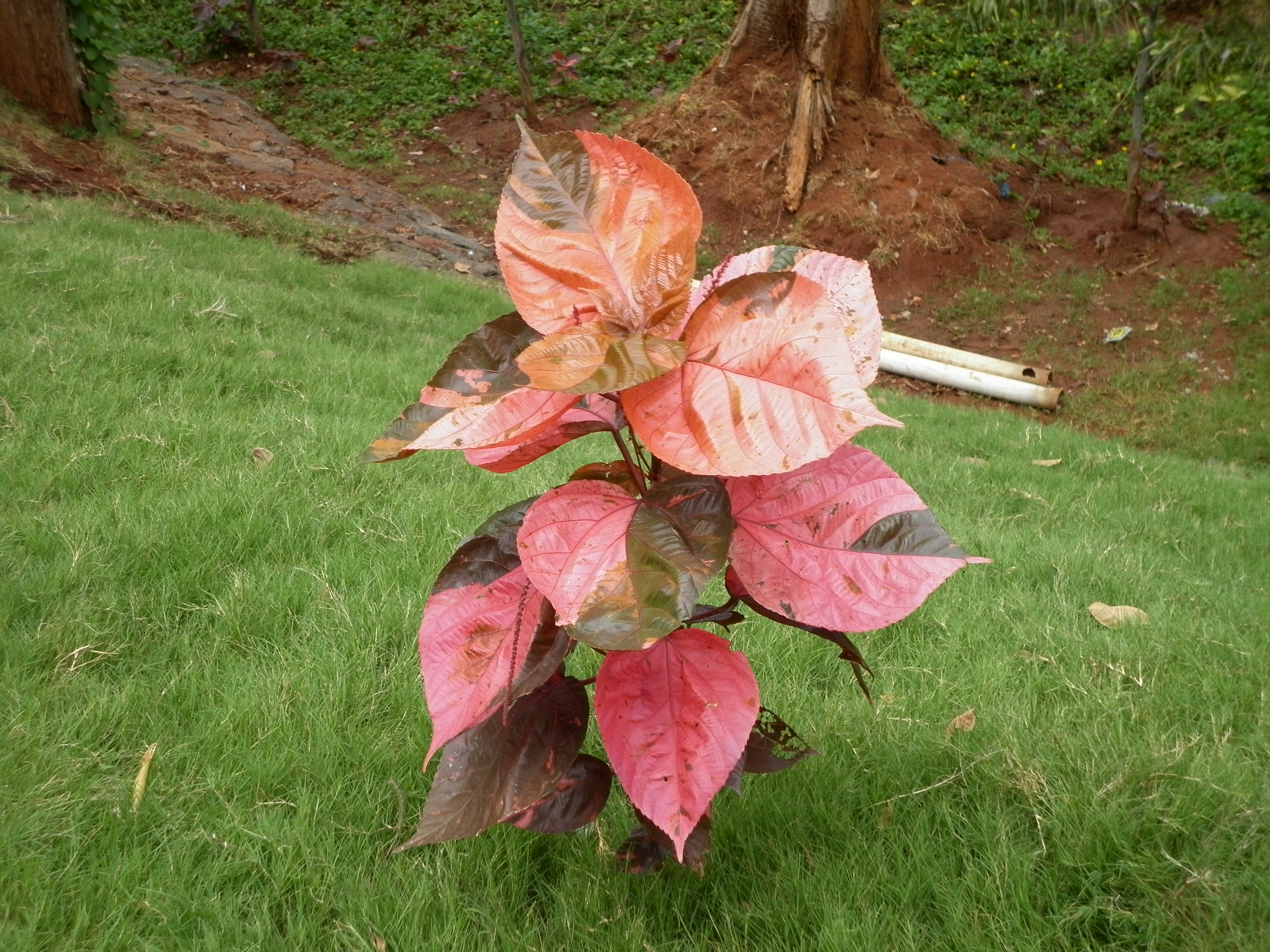
Acalypha wilkesiana at Courtallam

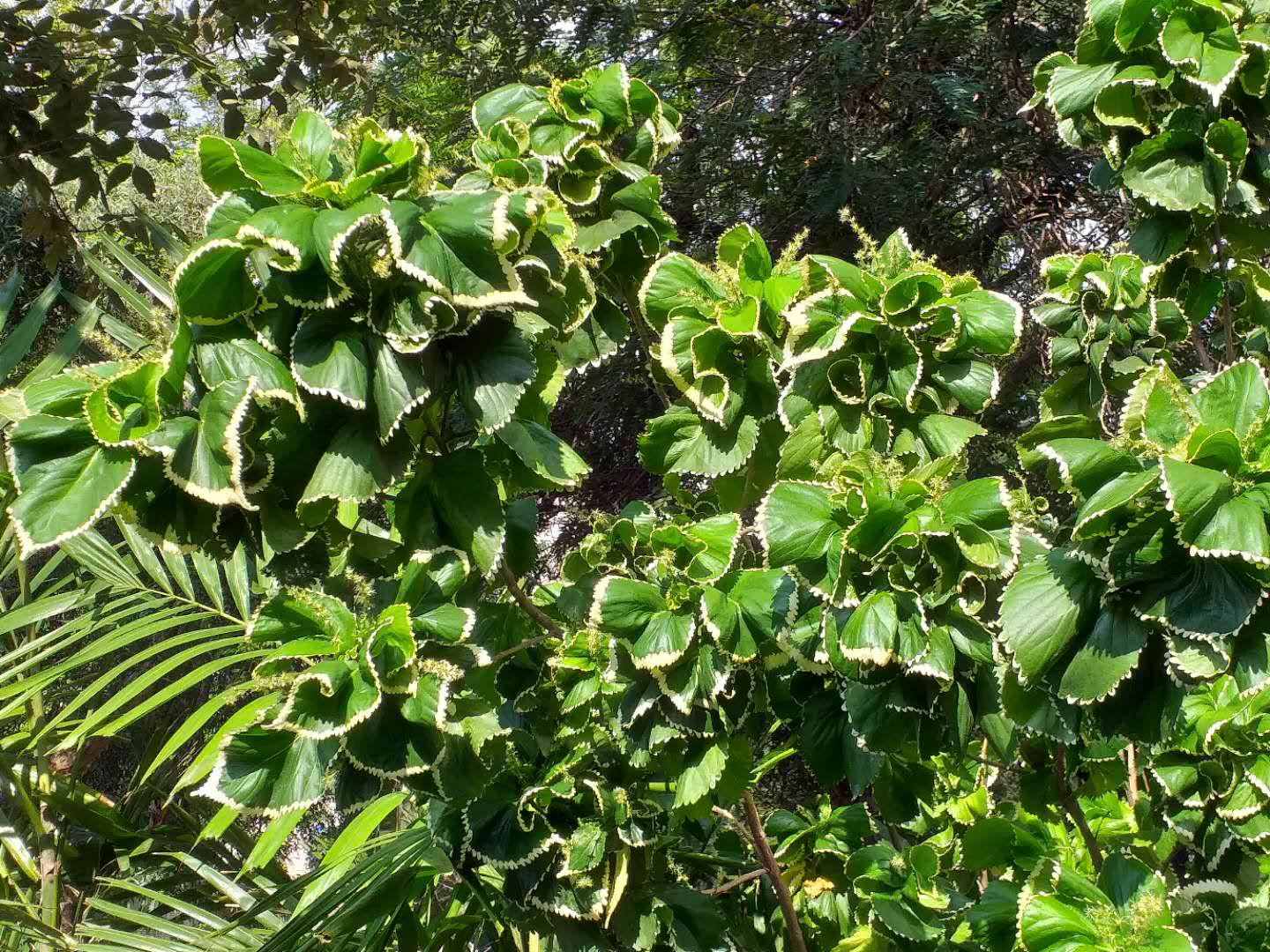
Acalypha wilkesiana Muell. Arg.

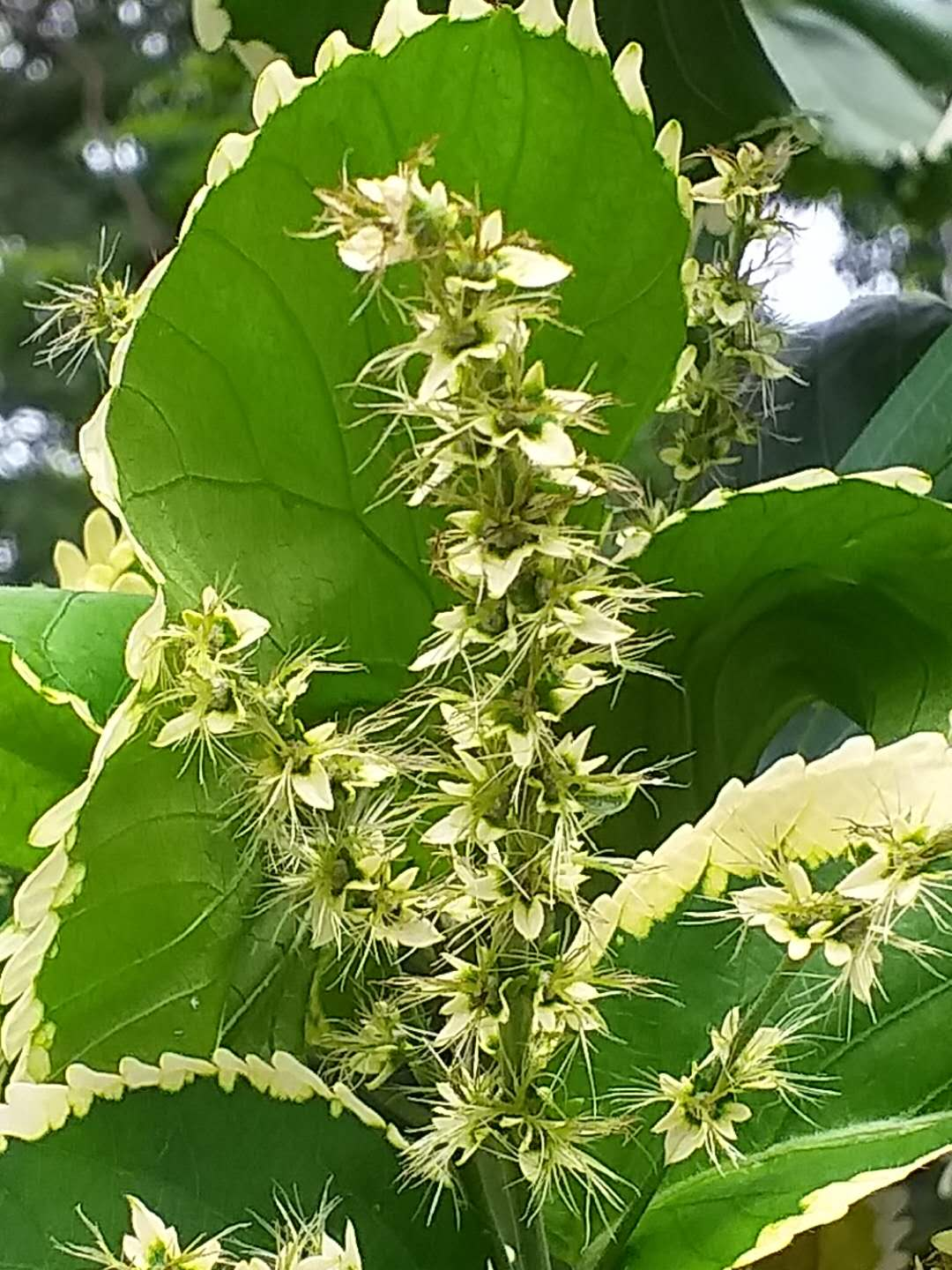
Inflorescence
