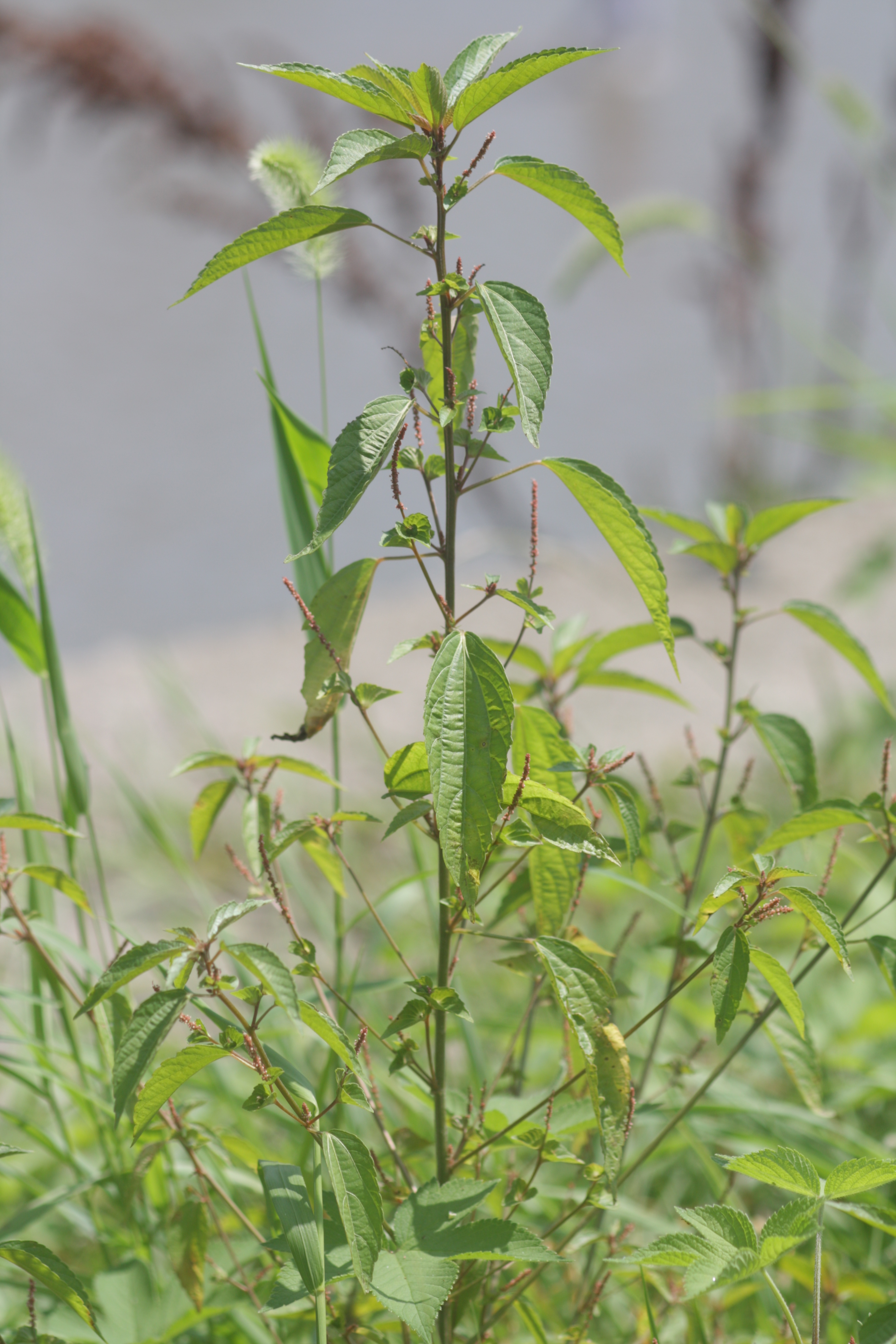

Scientific classification
- Kingdom: Plantae
- Clade: Tracheophytes
- Clade: Angiosperms
- Clade: Eudicots
- Clade: Rosids
- Order: Malpighiales
- Family: Euphorbiaceae
- Subtribe: Acalyphinae
- Genus: Acalypha
- Species: A. australis

Binomial name
- Acalypha australis L.

= Acalypha australis =

Species of flowering plant

Acalypha australis, commonly known as Asian copperleaf, is a species of flowering plant in the family Euphorbiaceae native to eastern Asia.

== Description ==
Acalypha australis is a herbaceous annual plant, growing 20–50 centimetres (8–20 in) tall. Its leaves are oblong to lanceolate, 3–9 cm (1.2–3.5 in) long, 1–5 cm (0.4–2.0 in) wide and borne on petioles 2–6 cm (0.8–2.4 in) long. The flowers are borne in axillary (sometimes terminal) panicles, forming inflorescences 15–50 mm (0.6–2.0 in) long. There are 1–3 female flowers and 5–7 male flowers per bract; the female flowers have three sepals, whereas the male flowers have four.

== Distribution and ecology ==
The native distribution of A. australis covers all of China except Nei Mongol and Xinjiang provinces, and parts of Japan, Korea, Laos, the Philippines, eastern Russia and Vietnam. The species has also been introduced to New York, Iowa, northern Australia (Queensland to Victoria) and eastern India.

In its native range, A. australis grows in grasslands and cultivated areas at altitudes of 100–1,200 m (330–3,940 ft), or exceptionally up to 1,900 m (6,200 ft), above sea level.
