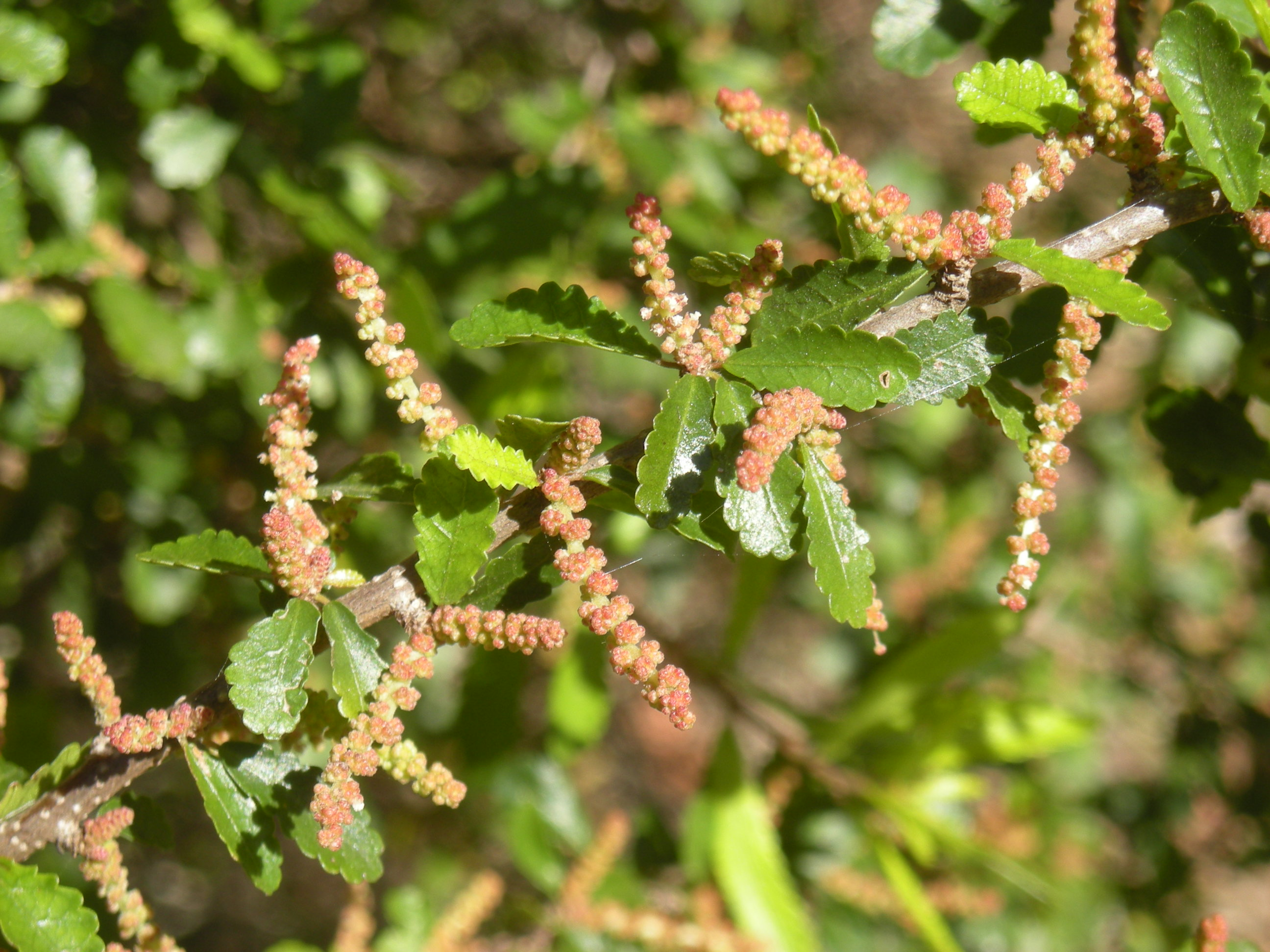
- Acalypha eromorum flowers and foliage

Scientific classification
- Kingdom: Plantae
- Clade: Tracheophytes
- Clade: Angiosperms
- Clade: Eudicots
- Clade: Rosids
- Order: Malpighiales
- Family: Euphorbiaceae
- Subtribe: Acalyphinae
- Genus: Acalypha
- Species: A. eremorum

Binomial name
- Acalypha eremorum Mull.Arg.

= Acalypha eremorum =

Species of flowering plant

Acalypha eremorum is a species of shrubs of the plant family Euphorbiaceae, endemic to Queensland, Australia. It is commonly known as soft acalypha, turkey bush or native acalypha. The species grows as an open branched shrub to 2 m tall with small leaves with crenate margins. Plants may shed their leaves in response to prolonged drought. Branches often end in spines, especially on smaller plants. Small flowers are produced in spikes throughout the year and are followed by deeply lobed capsular fruit.

Acalypha eremorum occurs naturally in forest understorey, primarily in the drier closed forest types such as vine scrub though occasionally in open forest. It has also been brought into cultivation as an ornamental garden plant.
