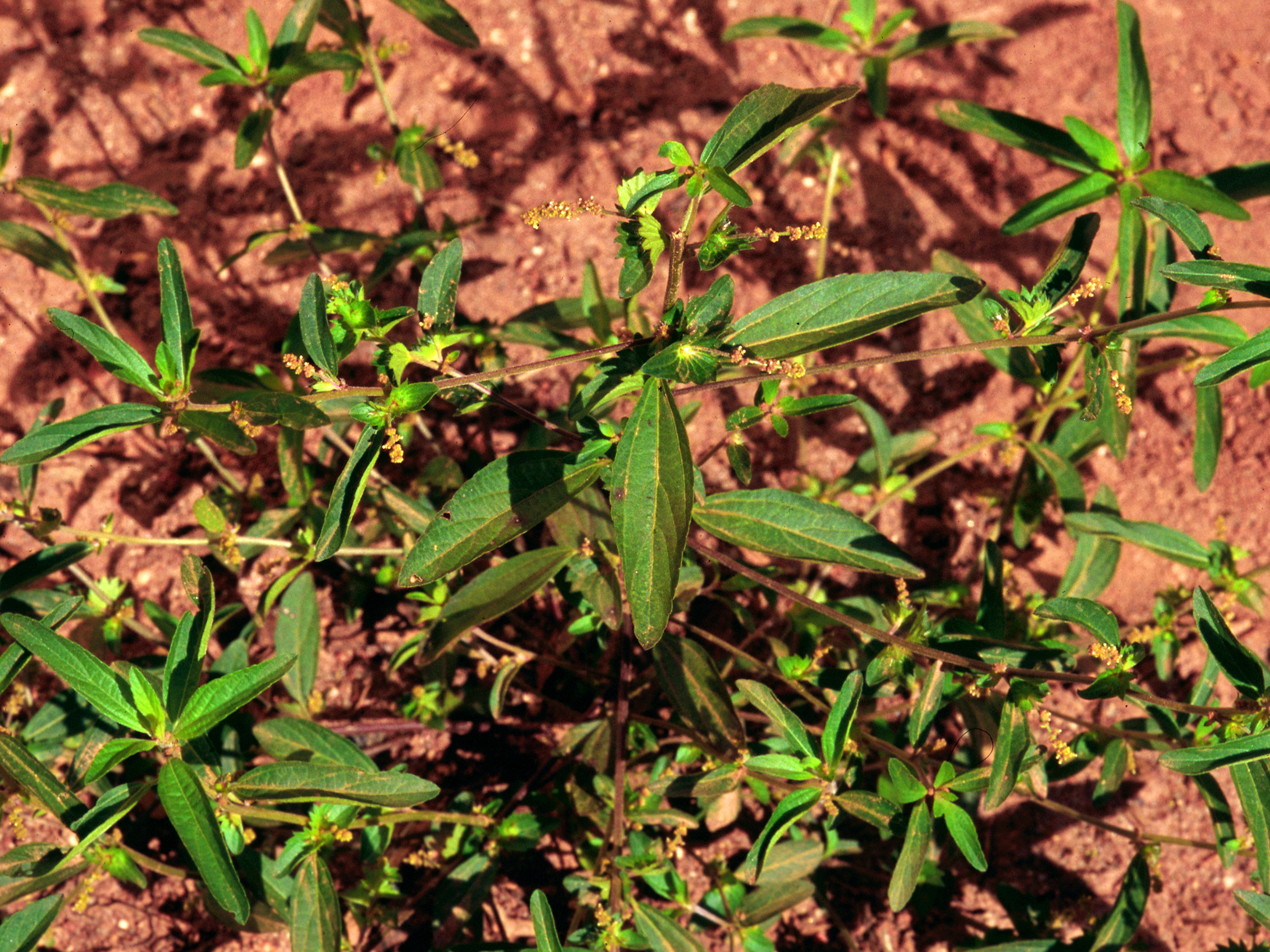

Scientific classification
- Kingdom: Plantae
- Clade: Tracheophytes
- Clade: Angiosperms
- Clade: Eudicots
- Clade: Rosids
- Order: Malpighiales
- Family: Euphorbiaceae
- Subtribe: Acalyphinae
- Genus: Acalypha
- Species: A. gracilens

Binomial name
- Acalypha gracilens A. Gray
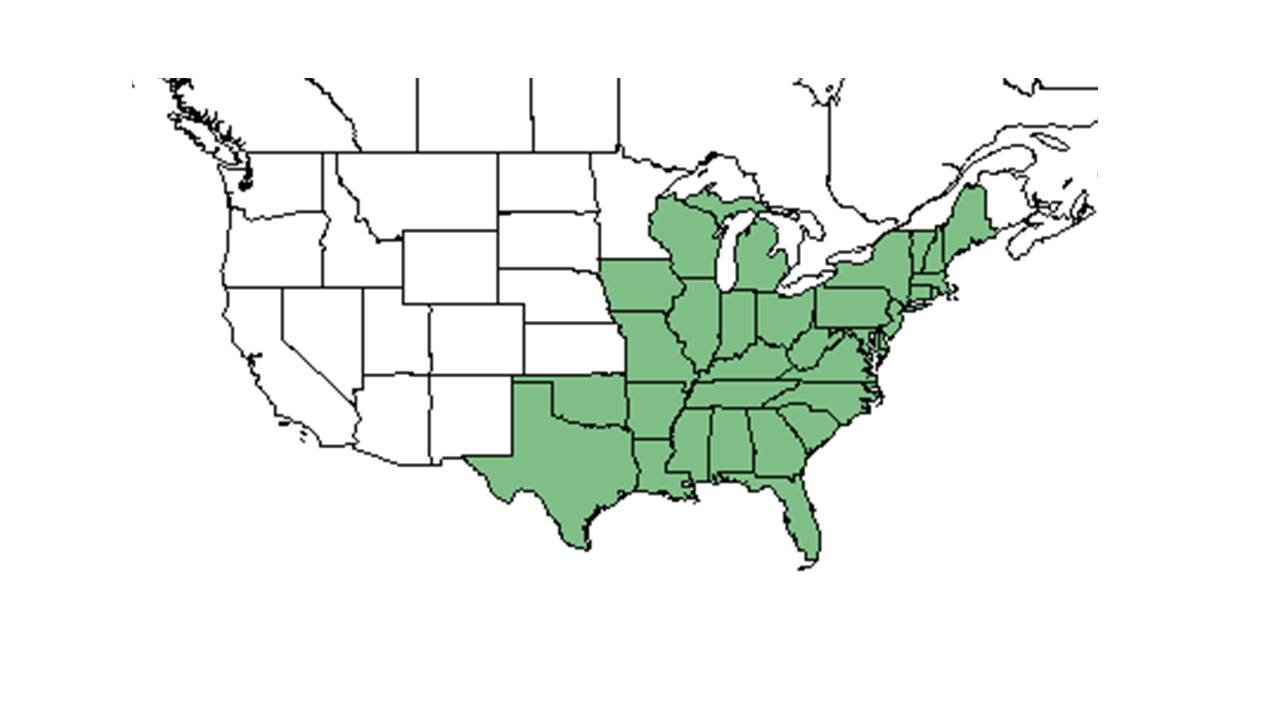
- Natural range of Acalypha gracilens from USDA NRCS Plants Database.

Synonyms
- List: Acalypha virginica Michx.; Acalypha virginica var. fraseri Müll.Arg.; Acalypha virginica var. gracilens (A.Gray) Riddell; Acalypha virginica var. intermedia Riddell; Acalypha virginica var. ovalifolia Riddell; Acalypha virginica var. ramosa Riddell; Acalypha virginica var. rhombifolia Riddell; Acalypha virginica var. texana Riddell

= Acalypha gracilens =

Species of flowering plant

Acalypha gracilens is a species of flowering plant in the family Euphorbiaceae. Common names include slender threeseed mercury; three-seeded mercury; shortstalk copperleaf; slender copperleaf. It is native to the south-eastern United States.

== Description ==
Annual. Plant is erect with pubescent stems coming from the taproots. The leaves are alternate with two lateral veins beginning from the base, prominent and parallel to the midrib, crenate to crenate-serrate, or petiolate. The spikes are axillary or terminal, or both. The bracts are leaf-like. There are no petals. The flowers are pistillate with 3–5 sepals and a 3-locular ovary. The staminate flowers with 4 sepals and 8–16 stamens. The capsules are broader than they are long.

The plant grows up to 0.8 m high. The stems are freely branched and densely pubescent with short incurved (or appressed) ascending trichomes. The leaves are elliptic to elliptic-lanceolate which are 2–6 cm long and 0.5–2 cm wide, obtuse, crenate. The base of the leaves are cuneate to rounded, with pubescence of both surfaces (more or less glabrate). The petioles of principle leaves are 0.4–1.5 cm long. The axillary spike has 1–5 pistillate flowers near the base that are interrupted and continued with a spike of staminate flowers. The pistillate bracts are often stipitate-glandular, teeth triangular, 5–13. The seeds are reddish to black in color and are ovoid, 1.2–1.8mm long. The plant is monoecious (female and male flowers exist on the same plant). The female (pistillate) flowers do not have petals but do have 3-5 sepals and 3 locular ovaries, and there will be 3-5 pistillate flowers located near the base of the axillary spike of A. gracilens. The male (staminate) flowers have 4 sepals and 8-16 stamens and interrupt and spike out from the female flowers. Flowers in June and into late frost.

== Distribution ==
A. gracilens is found throughout the south-eastern U.S. coastal plain and piedmont, eastern Midwest, and New England.

== Ecology ==
=== Habitat ===
In the south-eastern U.S. coastal plain it is a common plant found on frequently burned sandhills (Entisols), and in pine flatwoods (Spodosols) and upland pine communities (Ultisols), as well as floodplain forest (Alphisols). It thrives in frequently burned pine communities. It occurs in both native communities and areas with very disturbed soil. It occurs in a fairly wide range of well-drained soils, from deep sand to loams. Its light tolerance is fairly broad, from full light to shaded areas on the margins of clearings. In addition to the coastal plain it is common throughout the Piedmont region and infrequent in the mountains.

Acalypha gracilens has been found to be an increaser in its short-term response to single mechanical soil disturbances as well as in its long-term response following cessation of repeated soil disturbance. Its tolerance for light and shade is broad as it grows in open fully lit spaces to shaded field edges. Additionally, it serves as indicator species for the Clayhill Longleaf Woodlands community type as described in Carr et al. (2010).

Associated species include Liatris gracilis, L. tenuifolia, Polygonella gracilis, Didodia teres, Chrysopis lanuginosa, Rubus cuneifolis, Hypericum gentianoides, Trichostema dichotomum, Eupatorium compositifolium, and others.

=== Phenology ===
Flowers spring to fall through most of its range. Flowers all year in southern Florida.

=== Seed dispersal ===
This species is believed to disperse by explosion mechanisms or by ants.

=== Fire ecology ===
Populations of Acalypha gracilens have been known to persist through repeated annual and biennial burns.

=== Animal interactions ===
A. gracilens seeds are eaten by various songbirds and northern bobwhite quail. In the southeastern U.S. it is highly used by white-tailed deer as a forage plant due to their higher abundance in disturbed sites. This plant has been observed to be a host for the plant bug Coridromius chenopoderis (family Miridae), an invasive insect originating from Australia.
