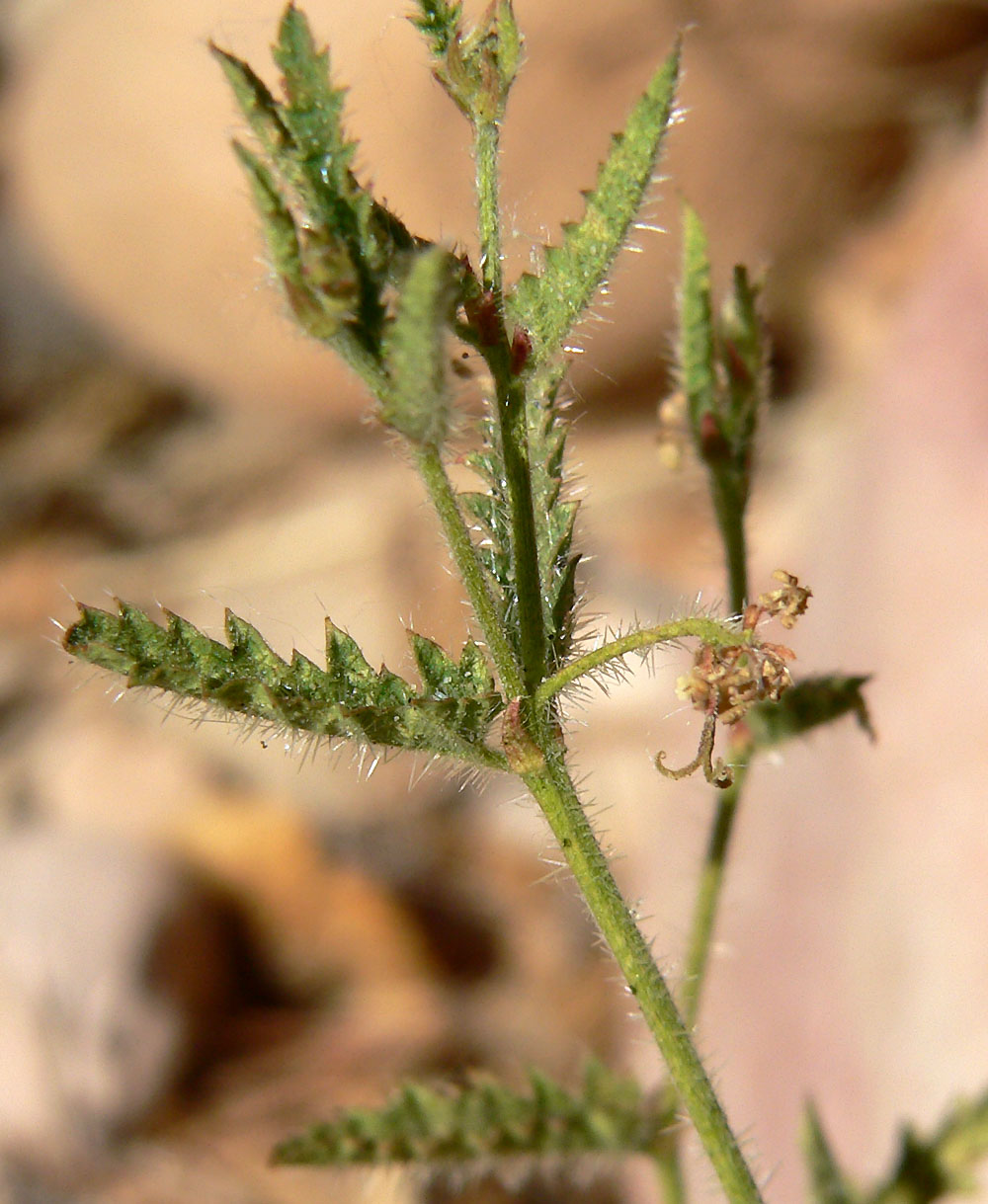
- Tragia ramosa, southern Nevada

Scientific classification
- Kingdom: Plantae
- Clade: Embryophytes
- Clade: Tracheophytes
- Clade: Spermatophytes
- Clade: Angiosperms
- Clade: Eudicots
- Clade: Rosids
- Order: Malpighiales
- Family: Euphorbiaceae
- Subfamily: Acalyphoideae
- Tribe: Plukenetieae
- Subtribe: Tragiinae
- Genus: Tragia; Plum. ex L.

Type species
- Tragia volubilis L.

Synonyms
- Agirta Baill.; Allosandra Raf.; Ctenomeria Harv.; Lassia Baill.; Leptobotrys Baill.; Leptorhachis Klotzsch; Leucandra Klotzsch; Schorigeram Adans.

= Tragia =

Noseburns

Genus of flowering plants in the spurge family Euphorbiaceae

Tragia is a genus of flowering plants in the spurge family, Euphorbiaceae. It is widespread across North and South America, Africa, the Arabian Peninsula, the Indian subcontinent, northern Australia, and to various islands in the Caribbean and in the Indian Ocean.

Plants in this genus are sometimes known as noseburns.

Of the more than 150 species in the genus, around 25 are mentioned as medicinal, with strong antibacterial, antifungal and antiproliferative activity.

These species are used in Siddha medicine, which is practiced by the Tamil people, and is used in curing eczema, fevers, wheezing, and diabetes.

Species

1. Tragia abortiva – Ethiopia
2. Tragia acalyphoides – Uzaramo
3. Tragia adenanthera – Tanzania, Malawi
4. Tragia adenophila – Paraguay
5. Tragia affinis – C + S Mexico
6. Tragia aliena – tropical America
7. Tragia amblyodonta – Mexico, SW US
8. Tragia angolensis – Angola, Zambia
9. Tragia arabica – Ethiopia, Yemen, Saudi Arabia
10. Tragia arnhemica – Northern Territory
11. Tragia ashiae – Ethiopia
12. Tragia aurea – Bolivia
13. Tragia bahiensis – Brazil, NE Argentina, Paraguay, Uruguay
14. Tragia balfourii – Socotra
15. Tragia ballyi – Kenya
16. Tragia baroniana – Madagascar
17. Tragia benthamii – tropical Africa
18. Tragia betonicifolia – SC US
19. Tragia bicolor – S India
20. Tragia biflora – Hispaniola
21. Tragia boiviniana – Nosy Be
22. Tragia bongolana – Sudan
23. Tragia brevipes – C + E Africa
24. Tragia brevispica – Texas, Oklahoma, Tamaulipas
25. Tragia brouniana – Sudan, Ethiopia, Somalia
26. Tragia capensis – South Africa
27. Tragia caperonioides – Paraguay
28. Tragia catamarcensis – Catamarca
29. Tragia ceanothifolia – Kenya
30. Tragia cearensis – Ceará
31. Tragia chevalieri – Benin, Ivory Coast, Nigeria
32. Tragia chlorocaulon – Bolivia, S Brazil
33. Tragia cinerea – Ethiopia, Somalia, Eritrea, Kenya
34. Tragia cocculifolia – Madagascar
35. Tragia collina – KwaZulu-Natal
36. Tragia cordata – SE + SC US
37. Tragia correae – Costa Rica, Panama
38. Tragia crenata – Ethiopia
39. Tragia cubensis – Cuba
40. Tragia cuneata – Bahia
41. Tragia descampsii – Zaire, Zambia, Tanzania
42. Tragia dinteri – Namibia
43. Tragia dioica – southern Africa
44. Tragia dodecandra – N Argentina
45. Tragia doryodes – Ethiopia
46. Tragia durbanensis – S Mozambique, South Africa
47. Tragia fallacina – Uruguay
48. Tragia fasciculata – Central African Rep
49. Tragia finalis – N Queensland
50. Tragia friesii – Bolivia, NW Argentina
51. Tragia furialis – SE Africa, Comoros, Madagascar
52. Tragia gardneri – Zimbabwe
53. Tragia geraniifolia – SE South America
54. Tragia giardelliae – S Brazil, Misiones
55. Tragia glabrescens – Kenya, Tanzania
56. Tragia glanduligera – Mexico, S Texas
57. Tragia gracilis – E Cuba
58. Tragia guatemalensis – Guatemala
59. Tragia hassleriana – Paraguay
60. Tragia hieronymi – Bolivia, NW Argentina, Paraguay
61. Tragia hildebrandtii – E Africa
62. Tragia hispida – Uttarakhand, Nepal, Assam, Bhutan, Bangladesh
63. Tragia imerinica – Madagascar
64. Tragia impedita – Kenya, Tanzania
65. Tragia incana – Uruguay
66. Tragia incisifolia – southern Africa
67. Tragia insuavis – Kenya, Tanzania
68. Tragia involucrata – Indian Subcontinent
69. Tragia ivohibeensis – Madagascar
70. Tragia jonesii – NW Mexico
71. Tragia karsteniana – Colombia
72. Tragia kirkiana – E + SE Africa
73. Tragia laciniata – S Arizona, Chihuahua, Sonora
74. Tragia laminularis – W Africa
75. Tragia lancifolia – Namibia
76. Tragia lasiophylla – Tanzania, Malawi, Zambia
77. Tragia lassia – Madagascar
78. Tragia leucandra – S Brazil
79. Tragia lippiifolia – Tanzania
80. Tragia lukafuensis – Katanga, Zambia
81. Tragia mazoensis – Zimbabwe
82. Tragia melochioides – Uruguay, NW Argentina, Paraguay, S Brazil
83. Tragia mexicana – Mexico, Belize, Guatemala
84. Tragia meyeriana – southern Africa
85. Tragia micromenes – Zambia
86. Tragia mildbraediana – W Africa
87. Tragia minor – southern Africa
88. Tragia mitis – Sudan, Ethiopia
89. Tragia mixta – E Africa
90. Tragia moammarensis – Yemen
91. Tragia monadelpha – Guinea
92. Tragia montana – S India, Sri Lanka
93. Tragia negeliensis – Ethiopia
94. Tragia nepetifolia – Mexico, Honduras, SW US
95. Tragia nigricans – Texas
96. Tragia novae-hollandiae – Queensland, New South Wales
97. Tragia okanyua – E + SE + S Africa
98. Tragia pacifica – Chiapas, Oaxaca, Sinaloa
99. Tragia paxii – S Brazil, Misiones
100. Tragia peltata – Rio de Janeiro
101. Tragia perrieri – Madagascar
102. Tragia petiolaris – Tanzania, Zambia
103. Tragia physocarpa – Namibia, Limpopo
104. Tragia pinnata – Uruguay, NW Argentina, Paraguay, S Brazil
105. Tragia platycalyx – Singida
106. Tragia plukenetii – E + C + SC Africa, India, Sri Lanka
107. Tragia plumieri – Haiti
108. Tragia pogostemonoides – Tanzania
109. Tragia pohlii – Goiás
110. Tragia polyandra – S Brazil, Misiones, Paraguay
111. Tragia polygonoides – Ivory Coast
112. Tragia potosina – San Luis Potosí
113. Tragia praetervisa – S India, Sri Lanka
114. Tragia preussii – W + C Africa
115. Tragia prionoides – Zimbabwe, Limpopo
116. Tragia prostrata – Zambia
117. Tragia pungens – NE Africa, Yemen, Saudi Arabia
118. Tragia ramosa – SW + SC US, Nuevo León, Coahuila
119. Tragia rhodesiae – Zambia, Zimbabwe, Malawi
120. Tragia rhoicifolia – N Somalia
121. Tragia rogersii – Limpopo
122. Tragia rupestris – southern Africa
123. Tragia sanjappae – S India
124. Tragia saxicola – S Florida
125. Tragia schlechteri – KwaZulu-Natal
126. Tragia schweinfurthii – Ethiopia
127. Tragia senegalensis – W Africa
128. Tragia shirensis – Malawi, Mozambique
129. Tragia smallii – SE US
130. Tragia sonderi – KwaZulu-Natal, Eswatini
131. Tragia spathulata – W Africa
132. Tragia stipularis – Uganda, Tanzania, Zambia
133. Tragia subhastata – Peru
134. Tragia subsessilis – Kenya, Tanzania
135. Tragia tabulaemontana – French Guiana
136. Tragia tenuifolia – tropical Africa
137. Tragia tiverneana – Madagascar
138. Tragia tripartita – Sudan
139. Tragia tristis – Paraguay, Brazil
140. Tragia triumfetoides – Ethiopia
141. Tragia uberabana – SE + SC South America
142. Tragia ukambensis – Kenya, Uganda
143. Tragia uncinata – Ethiopia
144. Tragia urens – SE US
145. Tragia urticifolia – SE + SC US, Tamaulipas, Campeche
146. Tragia vogelii – W + C Africa
147. Tragia volubilis – Mexico, S + C America, W Indies, tropical Africa
148. Tragia wahlbergiana – Mozambique, Limpopo
149. Tragia wildemanii – W Africa
150. Tragia yucatanensis – Yucatán, Belize, Honduras

formerly included

moved to other genera (Acalypha Adenophaedra Alchornea Bia Cleidion Cnesmone Dalechampia Megistostigma Micrococca Microstachys Omphalea Pachystylidium Platygyna Plukenetia Sclerocroton Shirakiopsis Tragiella Zuckertia )

1. T. alienata – Bia alienata
2. T. ambigua – Tragiella natalensis
3. T. anisosepala – Cnesmone anisosepala
4. T. anomala – Tragiella anomala
5. T. arborea – Acalypha filiformis
6. T. bailloniana – Zuckertia cordata
7. T. bicornis – Microstachys corniculata
8. T. bracteata – Omphalea bracteata
9. T. buettneri – Dalechampia ipomoeifolia
10. T. burmanica – Megistostigma burmanicum
11. T. castaneifolia – Acalypha integrifolia subsp. marginata
12. T. chamaelea – Microstachys chamaelea
13. T. cissoides – Bia alienata
14. T. colorata – Acalypha integrifolia
15. T. corniculata – Microstachys corniculata
16. T. delpyana – Pachystylidium hirsutum
17. T. dentata (Alain) Alain 1971 not Klotzsch ex Pax & K.Hoffm. 1919 – Platygyna dentata
18. T. elliptica – Shirakiopsis elliptica
19. T. fallax – Bia fallax
20. T. fendleri – Bia fendleri
21. T. filiformis – Cleidion javanicum
22. T. frieseana – Tragiella frieseana
23. T. fruticosa – Acalypha integrifolia
24. T. gagei – Pachystylidium hirsutum
25. T. grandifolia – Adenophaedra grandifolia
26. T. guayanensis – Monadelpha guayanensis
27. T. hastata Reinw. ex Hassk. 1868 not (Klotzsch) Müll.Arg. 1874 – Cnesmone javanica
28. T. hexandra – Platygyna hexandra
29. T. hirsuta – Pachystylidium hirsutum
30. T. howardii – Platygyna volubilis
31. T. innocua Blanco 1845 not Walter 1788 – Alchornea rugosa
32. T. integerrima – Sclerocroton integerrimus
33. T. integrifolia – Acalypha integrifolia
34. T. irritans – Pachystylidium hirsutum
35. T. japurensis – Bia fendleri
36. T. laevis – Cnesmone laevis
37. T. leonis – Platygyna leonis
38. T. lessertiana – Bia lessertiana
39. T. lobata – Acalypha integrifolia
40. T. macrophylla – Cnesmone javanica
41. T. mairei – Cnesmone mairei
42. T. marginata – Acalypha integrifolia
43. T. mercurialis – Micrococca mercurialis
44. T. natalensis Hochst. – Sclerocroton integerrimus
45. T. natalensis Sond. – Tragiella natalensis
46. T. obovata – Platygyna obovata
47. T. obtusata – Acalypha integrifolia
48. T. odorata – Acalypha integrifolia
49. T. parvifolia (Alain) Alain 1971 not Pax 1894 – Platygyna parvifolia
50. T. philippinensis – Cnesmone philippinensis
51. T. pilosa – Microstachys corniculata
52. T. pruricus – Platygyna hexandra
53. T. reticulata – Acalypha filiformis
54. T. rubiginosa – Chicomendes rubiginosus
55. T. rugosa – Cnesmone javanica
56. T. salviifolia – Acalypha salviifolia
57. T. saxatilis Bojer ex Pax 1924 – Acalypha spachiana
58. T. schultzeana – Plukenetia africana
59. T. sellowiana – Bia alienata
60. T. shankii – Dalechampia shankii
61. T. tenuis – Acalypha brachystachya
62. T. triandra Müll.Arg. 1866 – Seidelia triandra
63. T. triandra (Borhidi) Borhidi 1972 – Platygyna triandra
64. T. villosa – Acalypha capensis
