= List of Acalypha species =

The following species in the flowering plant genus Acalypha are accepted by Plants of the World Online. A taxonomically relevant feature of the genus is the presence of epidermal crystals in their leaves.

- Acalypha abingdonii Seberg
- Acalypha acapulcensis Fernald
- Acalypha accedens Müll.Arg.
- Acalypha acmophylla Hemsl.
- Acalypha acrogyna Pax
- Acalypha acuminata Benth.
- Acalypha adenostachya Müll.Arg.
- Acalypha aliena Brandegee
- Acalypha allenii Hutch.
- Acalypha almadinensis A.A.C.Sousa
- Acalypha alopecuroidea Jacq.
- Acalypha ambigua Pax
- Acalypha amblyodonta (Müll.Arg.) Müll.Arg.
- Acalypha amentacea Roxb.
- Acalypha amplexicaulis A.C.Sm.
- Acalypha ampliata Pax & K.Hoffm.
- Acalypha anadenia Standl.
- Acalypha anemioides Kunth
- Acalypha angatensis Blanco
- Acalypha angustata Sond.
- Acalypha angustifolia Sw.
- Acalypha angustissima Pax
- Acalypha annobonae Pax & K.Hoffm.
- Acalypha apetiolata Allem & J.L.Wächt.
- Acalypha apodanthes Standl. & L.O.Williams
- Acalypha arciana (Baill.) Müll.Arg.
- Acalypha argentii Sagun & G.A.Levin
- Acalypha argomuelleri Briq.
- Acalypha aronioides Pax & K.Hoffm.
- Acalypha arvensis Poepp.
- Acalypha aspericocca Pax & K.Hoffm.
- Acalypha australis L.
- Acalypha bailloniana Müll.Arg.
- Acalypha balansae Guillaumin
- Acalypha balgooyi Sagun & G.A.Levin
- Acalypha baretiae I.Montero & Cardiel
- Acalypha beckii Cardiel
- Acalypha benguelensis Müll.Arg.
- Acalypha berteroana Müll.Arg.
- Acalypha bipartita Müll.Arg.
- Acalypha bisetosa Bertol. ex Spreng.
- Acalypha boinensis Leandri
- Acalypha boiviniana Baill.
- Acalypha boliviensis Müll.Arg.
- Acalypha botteriana Müll.Arg.
- Acalypha brachyclada Müll.Arg.
- Acalypha brachystachya Hornem.
- Acalypha brasiliensis Müll.Arg.
- Acalypha brevibracteata Müll.Arg.
- Acalypha brevicaulis Müll.Arg.
- Acalypha buddleifolia Pax & K.Hoffm.
- Acalypha bullata Müll.Arg.
- Acalypha burmanii I.Montero & Cardiel
- Acalypha burquezii V.W.Steinm. & Felger
- Acalypha bussei Hutch.
- Acalypha caeciliae Pax & K.Hoffm.
- Acalypha californica Benth.
- Acalypha caperonioides Baill.
- Acalypha capillipes Müll.Arg.
- Acalypha capitata Willd.
- Acalypha cardiophylla Merr.
- Acalypha carrascoana Cardiel
- Acalypha carthagenensis Jacq.
- Acalypha castroviejoi Cardiel
- Acalypha caturus Blume
- Acalypha ceraceopunctata Pax
- Acalypha chamaedrifolia (Lam.) Müll.Arg.
- Acalypha chaquensis Cardiel & I.Montero
- Acalypha chiapensis Brandegee
- Acalypha chibomboa Baill.
- Acalypha chirindica S.Moore
- Acalypha chlorocardia Standl.
- Acalypha chocoana Cardiel
- Acalypha chordantha F.Seym.
- Acalypha chorisandra Baill.
- Acalypha chuniana H.G.Ye, Y.S.Ye, X.S.Qin & F.W.Xing
- Acalypha ciliata Forssk.
- Acalypha cincta Müll.Arg.
- Acalypha cinerea Pax & K.Hoffm.
- Acalypha claoxyloides Hutch.
- Acalypha claussenii (Turcz.) Müll.Arg.
- Acalypha clutioides Radcl.-Sm.
- Acalypha coleispica Pax & K.Hoffm.
- Acalypha communis Müll.Arg.
- Acalypha comonduana Millsp.
- Acalypha confertiflora Pax & K.Hoffm.
- Acalypha conspicua Müll.Arg.
- Acalypha contermina Müll.Arg.
- Acalypha costaricensis (Kuntze) Knobl. ex Pax & K.Hoffm.
- Acalypha crenata Hochst. ex A.Rich.
- Acalypha × cristata Radcl.-Sm.
- Acalypha crockeri Fosberg
- Acalypha cubensis Urb.
- Acalypha cuneata Poepp.
- Acalypha cuprea Herzog
- Acalypha cupricola Robyns ex G.A.Levin
- Acalypha cuspidata Jacq.
- Acalypha dalzellii Hook.f.
- Acalypha deamii (Weath.) Ahles
- Acalypha decaryana Leandri
- Acalypha decumbens Thunb.
- Acalypha delgadoana McVaugh
- Acalypha delicata Cardiel
- Acalypha delpyana Gagnep.
- Acalypha deltoidea Robyns & Lawalrée
- Acalypha depauperata Müll.Arg.
- Acalypha depressinervia (Kuntze) K.Schum.
- Acalypha dewevrei Pax
- Acalypha dictyoneura Müll.Arg.
- Acalypha digynostachya Baill.
- Acalypha dikuluwensis P.A.Duvign. & Dewit
- Acalypha diminuta Baill.
- Acalypha dimorpha Müll.Arg.
- Acalypha dioica S.Watson
- Acalypha distans Müll.Arg.
- Acalypha divaricata Müll.Arg.
- Acalypha diversifolia Jacq.
- Acalypha dregei Gand.
- Acalypha dumetorum Müll.Arg.
- Acalypha eastmostpointensis S.S.Ying
- Acalypha echinus Pax & K.Hoffm.
- Acalypha ecklonii Baill.
- Acalypha elizabethiae R.A.Howard
- Acalypha elliptica Sw.
- Acalypha elskensii De Wild.
- Acalypha emirnensis Baill.
- Acalypha engleri Pax
- Acalypha erecta Paul G.Wilson
- Acalypha eremorum Müll.Arg.
- Acalypha eriophylla Hutch.
- Acalypha eriophylloides S.Moore
- Acalypha erubescens B.L.Rob. & Greenm.
- Acalypha euphrasiostachys Bartlett
- Acalypha fasciculata Müll.Arg.
- Acalypha ferdinandi K.Hoffm.
- Acalypha filiformis Poir.
- Acalypha filipes (S.Watson) McVaugh
- Acalypha fimbriata Schumach. & Thonn.
- Acalypha firmula Müll.Arg.
- Acalypha fissa (Müll.Arg.) Hutch.
- Acalypha flaccida Hook.f.
- Acalypha flagellata Millsp.
- Acalypha flavescens S.Watson
- Acalypha floresensis Sagun & G.A.Levin
- Acalypha forbesii S.Moore
- Acalypha forsteriana Müll.Arg.
- Acalypha fournieri Müll.Arg.
- Acalypha fragilis Pax & K.Hoffm.
- Acalypha fredericii Müll.Arg.
- Acalypha fruticosa Forssk.
- Acalypha fulva I.M.Johnst.
- Acalypha fuscescens Müll.Arg.
- Acalypha gaumeri Pax & K.Hoffm.
- Acalypha gentlei Atha
- Acalypha gibsonii (J.Graham) M.R.Almeida
- Acalypha gigantesca McVaugh
- Acalypha gillespieae G.A.Levin & I.Montero
- Acalypha gillmanii Radcl.-Sm.
- Acalypha glabrata Thunb.
- Acalypha glandulifolia Buchinger & Meisn. ex C.Krauss
- Acalypha glandulosa Cav.
- Acalypha glechomifolia A.Rich.
- Acalypha gossweileri S.Moore
- Acalypha gracilens A.Gray
- Acalypha gracilipes Baill.
- Acalypha gracilis Spreng.
- Acalypha grandibracteata Merr.
- Acalypha grandis Benth.
- Acalypha grisea Pax & K.Hoffm.
- Acalypha grisebachiana (Kuntze) Pax & K.Hoffm.
- Acalypha grueningiana Pax & K.Hoffm.
- Acalypha guatemalensis Pax & K.Hoffm.
- Acalypha guineensis J.K.Morton & G.A.Levin
- Acalypha gummifera Lundell
- Acalypha hainanensis Merr. & Chun
- Acalypha haploclada Pax & K.Hoffm.
- Acalypha hassleriana Chodat
- Acalypha havanensis Müll.Arg.
- Acalypha helenae Buscal. & Muschl.
- Acalypha hellwigii Warb.
- Acalypha herzogiana Pax & K.Hoffm.
- Acalypha hibiscifolia Britton
- Acalypha hispida Burm.f.
- Acalypha hochstetteriana Müll.Arg.
- Acalypha homblei De Wild.
- Acalypha huillensis Pax & K.Hoffm.
- Acalypha humbertii Leandri
- Acalypha hutchinsonii Britton
- Acalypha hypogaea S.Watson
- Acalypha inaequilatera Cardiel
- Acalypha indica L.
- Acalypha infesta Poepp.
- Acalypha inselbergensis Cardiel & I.Montero
- Acalypha insulana Müll.Arg.
- Acalypha integrifolia Willd.
- Acalypha intermedia De Wild.
- Acalypha isaloensis I.Montero & Cardiel
- Acalypha jerzedowskii Calderón
- Acalypha jubifera Rusby
- Acalypha juruana Ule
- Acalypha karwinskii Müll.Arg.
- Acalypha katharinae Pax
- Acalypha kerrii Craib
- Acalypha klotzschii Baill.
- Acalypha × koraensis Radcl.-Sm.
- Acalypha laevigata Sw.
- Acalypha lagascana Müll.Arg.
- Acalypha lagoensis Müll.Arg.
- Acalypha lagopus McVaugh
- Acalypha lamiana (Leandri) I.Montero & Cardiel
- Acalypha lanceolata Willd.
- Acalypha lancetillae Standl.
- Acalypha langiana Müll.Arg.
- Acalypha laxiflora Müll.Arg.
- Acalypha leandrii I.Montero & Cardiel
- Acalypha leicesterfieldiensis Radcl.-Sm. & Govaerts
- Acalypha leonii Baill.
- Acalypha lepidopagensis Leandri
- Acalypha lepinei Müll.Arg.
- Acalypha leptoclada Benth.
- Acalypha leptomyura Baill.
- Acalypha leptopoda Müll.Arg.
- Acalypha leptorhachis Müll.Arg.
- Acalypha liebmanniana Müll.Arg.
- Acalypha lignosa Brandegee
- Acalypha lindeniana Müll.Arg.
- Acalypha linearifolia Leandri
- Acalypha longipes S.Watson
- Acalypha longipetiolata Cardiel
- Acalypha longispica Warb.
- Acalypha longispicata Müll.Arg.
- Acalypha longistipularis Müll.Arg.
- Acalypha lovelandii (McVaugh) McVaugh
- Acalypha lycioides Pax & K.Hoffm.
- Acalypha lyonsii P.I.Forst.
- Acalypha machiensis Cardiel & P.Muñoz
- Acalypha macrodonta Müll.Arg.
- Acalypha macrostachya Jacq.
- Acalypha macrostachyoides Müll.Arg.
- Acalypha macularis Pax & K.Hoffm.
- Acalypha maestrensis Urb.
- Acalypha mairei (H.Lév.) C.K.Schneid.
- Acalypha malabarica Müll.Arg.
- Acalypha × malawiensis Radcl.-Sm.
- Acalypha manniana Müll.Arg.
- Acalypha marginata (Poir.) Spreng.
- Acalypha marissima M.G.Gilbert
- Acalypha martiana Müll.Arg.
- Acalypha matsudae Hayata
- Acalypha mayottensis I.Montero & Cardiel
- Acalypha medibracteata Radcl.-Sm. & Govaerts
- Acalypha melochiifolia Müll.Arg.
- Acalypha membranacea A.Rich.
- Acalypha menavody (Leandri) I.Montero & Cardiel
- Acalypha mentiens Gand.
- Acalypha mexicana Müll.Arg.
- Acalypha michoacanensis Sessé & Moc.
- Acalypha microcephala Müll.Arg.
- Acalypha microphylla Klotzsch
- Acalypha mogotensis Urb.
- Acalypha mollis Kunth
- Acalypha monococca (Engelm. ex A.Gray) Lill.W.Mill. & Gandhi
- Acalypha monostachya Cav.
- Acalypha mortoniana Lundell
- Acalypha muelleriana Urb.
- Acalypha multicaulis Müll.Arg.
- Acalypha multifida N.E.Br.
- Acalypha multispicata S.Watson
- Acalypha mutisii Cardiel
- Acalypha nana (Müll.Arg.) Griseb. ex Hutch.
- Acalypha neeana Cardiel & P.Muñoz
- Acalypha nemorum F.Muell. ex Müll.Arg.
- Acalypha neomexicana Müll.Arg.
- Acalypha neptunica Müll.Arg.
- Acalypha nervulosa Airy Shaw
- Acalypha noronhae Ridl.
- Acalypha novoguineensis Warb.
- Acalypha nubicola McVaugh
- Acalypha nusbaumeri I.Montero & Cardiel
- Acalypha nyasica Hutch.
- Acalypha oblancifolia Lundell
- Acalypha obscura Müll.Arg.
- Acalypha ocymoides Kunth
- Acalypha oligantha Müll.Arg.
- Acalypha oligodonta Müll.Arg.
- Acalypha omissa Pax & K.Hoffm.
- Acalypha oreopola Greenm.
- Acalypha ornata Hochst. ex A.Rich.
- Acalypha oxyodonta (Müll.Arg.) Müll.Arg.
- Acalypha padifolia Kunth
- Acalypha pallescens Urb.
- Acalypha palmeri Pax & K.Hoffm.
- Acalypha pancheriana Baill.
- Acalypha paniculata Miq.
- Acalypha papillosa Rose
- Acalypha parvula Hook.f.
- Acalypha patens Müll.Arg.
- Acalypha paucifolia Baker & Hutch.
- Acalypha paupercula Pax & K.Hoffm.
- Acalypha peckoltii Müll.Arg.
- Acalypha pedemontana Cardiel & I.Montero
- Acalypha peduncularis Meisn. ex C.Krauss
- Acalypha pendula C.Wright ex Griseb.
- Acalypha perrieri Leandri
- Acalypha persimilis Müll.Arg.
- Acalypha peruviana Müll.Arg.
- Acalypha pervilleana Baill.
- Acalypha phleoides Cav.
- Acalypha phyllonomifolia Airy Shaw
- Acalypha pilosa Cav.
- Acalypha pippenii McVaugh
- Acalypha pittieri Pax & K.Hoffm.
- Acalypha platyphylla Müll.Arg.
- Acalypha pleiogyne Airy Shaw
- Acalypha plicata Müll.Arg.
- Acalypha pohliana Müll.Arg.
- Acalypha poiretii Spreng.
- Acalypha polymorpha Müll.Arg.
- Acalypha polystachya Jacq.
- Acalypha portoricensis Müll.Arg.
- Acalypha pruinosa Urb.
- Acalypha pruriens Nees & Mart.
- Acalypha psamofila Cardiel, M.Nee & P.M.Rodr.
- Acalypha pseudalopecuroides Pax & K.Hoffm.
- Acalypha pseudovagans Pax & K.Hoffm.
- Acalypha psilostachya Hochst. ex A.Rich.
- Acalypha pubiflora (Klotzsch) Baill.
- Acalypha pulchrespicata Däniker
- Acalypha pulogensis Sagun & G.A.Levin
- Acalypha punctata Meisn. ex C.Krauss
- Acalypha purpurascens Kunth
- Acalypha purpusii Brandegee
- Acalypha pycnantha Urb.
- Acalypha pygmaea A.Rich.
- Acalypha rabesahalana I.Montero & Cardiel
- Acalypha radians Torr.
- Acalypha radicans Müll.Arg.
- Acalypha radinostachya Donn.Sm.
- Acalypha radula Baker
- Acalypha rafaelensis Standl.
- Acalypha raivavensis F.Br.
- Acalypha rapensis F.Br.
- Acalypha reflexa Müll.Arg.
- Acalypha repanda Müll.Arg.
- Acalypha retifera Standl. & L.O.Williams
- Acalypha rheedei (J.Graham) M.R.Almeida
- Acalypha rhombifolia Schltdl.
- Acalypha rhomboidea Raf.
- Acalypha richardiana Baill.
- Acalypha riedeliana Baill.
- Acalypha rivularis Seem.
- Acalypha rottleroides Baill.
- Acalypha rubrinervis Cronk
- Acalypha rubroserrata Pax & K.Hoffm.
- Acalypha ruderalis Mart. ex Britton
- Acalypha ruiziana Müll.Arg.
- Acalypha rupestris Urb.
- Acalypha sabulicola Brandegee
- Acalypha salicifolia Müll.Arg.
- Acalypha salicina Hutch. ex Cardiel
- Acalypha salvadorensis Standl.
- Acalypha salviifolia Baill.
- Acalypha saxicola Wiggins
- Acalypha scabrosa Sw.
- Acalypha scandens Benth.
- Acalypha schiedeana Schltdl.
- Acalypha schlechtendaliana Müll.Arg.
- Acalypha schlechteri Gand.
- Acalypha schlumbergeri Müll.Arg.
- Acalypha schneideriana Pax & K.Hoffm.
- Acalypha schreiteri Lillo ex Lourteig & O'Donell
- Acalypha schultesii Cardiel
- Acalypha segetalis Müll.Arg.
- Acalypha sehnemii Allem & Irgang
- Acalypha seleriana Greenm.
- Acalypha seminuda Müll.Arg.
- Acalypha senilis Baill.
- Acalypha septemloba Müll.Arg.
- Acalypha sericea Andersson
- Acalypha sessilifolia S.Watson
- Acalypha setosa A.Rich.
- Acalypha siamensis Oliv. ex Gage
- Acalypha simplicistyla Cardiel
- Acalypha skutchii I.M.Johnst.
- Acalypha sonderi Gand.
- Acalypha sonderiana Müll.Arg.
- Acalypha spachiana Baill.
- Acalypha spectabilis Airy Shaw
- Acalypha stachyura Pax
- Acalypha stellata Cardiel
- Acalypha stenoloba Müll.Arg.
- Acalypha stenophylla K.Schum.
- Acalypha stricta Poepp.
- Acalypha striolata Lingelsh.
- Acalypha subcastrata F.Aresch.
- Acalypha subintegra Airy Shaw
- Acalypha subsana Mart. ex Colla
- Acalypha subscandens Rusby
- Acalypha subterranea Paul G.Wilson
- Acalypha subtomentosa Lag.
- Acalypha subviscida S.Watson
- Acalypha swallowensis Fosberg
- Acalypha synoica Pax & K.Hoffm.
- Acalypha tacanensis Lundell
- Acalypha tenuicauda Pax & K.Hoffm.
- Acalypha tenuifolia Müll.Arg.
- Acalypha tenuiramea Müll.Arg.
- Acalypha tomentosa Sw.
- Acalypha trachyloba Müll.Arg.
- Acalypha tremula I.Montero & Cardiel
- Acalypha tricholoba Müll.Arg.
- Acalypha trilaciniata Paul G.Wilson
- Acalypha triloba Müll.Arg.
- Acalypha uleana L.B.Sm. & Downs
- Acalypha umbrosa Brandegee
- Acalypha urophylla Baill.
- Acalypha urostachya Baill.
- Acalypha vagans Cav.
- Acalypha vallartae McVaugh
- Acalypha variabilis Klotzsch ex Baill.
- Acalypha vellamea Baill.
- Acalypha velutina Hook.f.
- Acalypha venezuelica Cardiel
- Acalypha verbenacea Standl.
- Acalypha veronicoides Pax & K.Hoffm.
- Acalypha villicaulis Hochst. ex A.Rich.
- Acalypha villosa Jacq.
- Acalypha virgata L.
- Acalypha virginica L.
- Acalypha volkensii Pax
- Acalypha vulneraria Baill.
- Acalypha websteri Cardiel
- Acalypha weddelliana Baill.
- Acalypha welwitschiana Müll.Arg.
- Acalypha wigginsii G.L.Webster
- Acalypha wilderi Merr.
- Acalypha wilkesiana Müll.Arg.
- Acalypha wilmsii Pax ex Prain & Hutch.
- Acalypha wui H.S.Kiu
- Acalypha zeyheri Baill.
- Acalypha zollingeri Müll.Arg.
