= Romanoa =

Romanoa is the generic name of two groups of organisms, and may refer to:

- Romanoa Trevis. 1848, a genus of plants in the family Euphorbiaceae
- Romanoa Thirum. 1954, a genus of fungi in the family Clavicipitaceae
