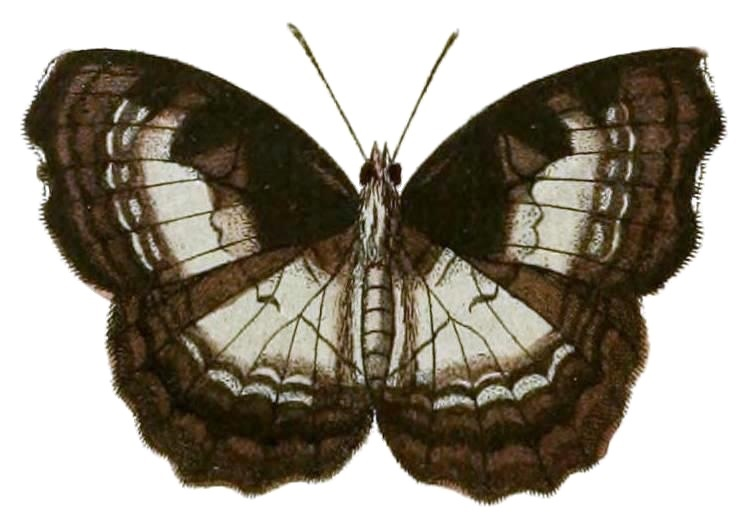

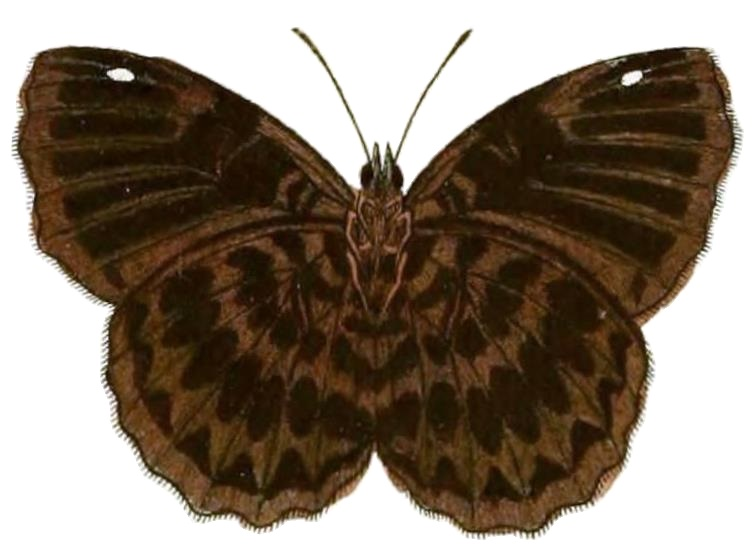

Scientific classification
- Kingdom: Animalia
- Phylum: Arthropoda
- Clade: Pancrustacea
- Class: Insecta
- Order: Lepidoptera
- Family: Nymphalidae
- Genus: Ariadne
- Species: A. enotrea

Binomial name
- Ariadne enotrea (Cramer, 1779)

Synonyms
- Papilio enotrea Cramer, 1779; Papilio alphaea Drury, 1782; Ariadne archeri Carcasson, 1958; Ergolis enotria suffusa Joicey & Talbot, 1921

= Ariadne enotrea =

African castor

Species of butterfly

Ariadne enotrea, the African castor, is a butterfly in the family Nymphalidae. It is found in Sierra Leone, Liberia, Ivory Coast, Ghana, Togo, Benin, Nigeria, Cameroon, Gabon, the Republic of the Congo, the Central African Republic, Uganda, Kenya, Tanzania, Angola and the Democratic Republic of the Congo. The habitat consists of forests (especially disturbed areas) and heavy woodland.

The larvae feed on Tragia species T. benthami, T. volubilis, T. brevipes and Dalechampia ipomaefolia.

== Subspecies ==
- Ariadne enotrea enotrea (Sierra Leone, Liberia, Ivory Coast, Ghana, Togo, Benin, Nigeria: south and the Cross River loop, western Cameroon)
- Ariadne enotrea archeri Carcasson, 1958 (western Tanzania, Angola, southern Democratic Republic of the Congo)
- Ariadne enotrea suffusa (Joicey & Talbot, 1921) (eastern Cameroon, Gabon, Congo, Central African Republic, Democratic Republic of the Congo, Uganda, western Kenya, western Tanzania)

Torben Larsen developed a species numbering system for his 2005 publication Butterflies of West Africa. The nominate subspecies is #828. The 'Larsen' numbers have since been used with permission in A Sharp Eye on Butterflies of Ghana.
