= Sphaerostylis =

Scientific classification
- Kingdom: Plantae
- Clade: Tracheophytes
- Clade: Angiosperms
- Clade: Eudicots
- Clade: Rosids
- Order: Malpighiales
- Family: Euphorbiaceae
- Subfamily: Acalyphoideae
- Tribe: Plukenetieae
- Subtribe: Tragiinae
- Genus: Sphaerostylis; Baill.

Genus of plants

Sphaerostylis is a genus of plant of the family Euphorbiaceae first described as a genus in 1858. The entire genus is endemic to Madagascar.

Species

1. Sphaerostylis perrieri Leandri
2. Sphaerostylis tulasneana Baill.

Formerly included

moved to other genera (Megistostigma Tragiella )

1. Sphaerostylis anomala - Tragiella anomala
2. Sphaerostylis cordata - Megistostigma cordatum
3. Sphaerostylis frieseana - Tragiella frieseana
4. Sphaerostylis glabrata - Megistostigma glabratum
5. Sphaerostylis malaccensis - Megistostigma glabratum
6. Sphaerostylis natalensis - Tragiella natalensis
