= African walnut =

African walnut is a common name for several African plants and may refer to:

- Coula edulis, in the family Olacaceae
- Lovoa trichilioides, in the family Meliaceae
- Plukenetia conophora, in the family Euphorbiaceae
- Schotia brachypetala, in the family Fabaceae
