= Redia =

Redia or redia may refer to:

- A synonym for the plant genus Cleidion, of the family Euphorbiaceae
- A stage in the development of a trematode
- A dipstick for urinalysis, determining levels of glucose, albumin and erythrocytes
- An Italian zoological journal, named after Francesco Redi, started in 1903 and currently published by the Research Centre for Agrobiology and Pedology (ABP) of the Agricultural Research Council (CRA)
