= Astrococcus =

Scientific classification
- Kingdom: Plantae
- Clade: Tracheophytes
- Clade: Angiosperms
- Clade: Eudicots
- Clade: Rosids
- Order: Malpighiales
- Family: Euphorbiaceae
- Subfamily: Acalyphoideae
- Tribe: Plukenetieae
- Subtribe: Plukenetiinae
- Genus: Astrococcus; Benth.
- Species: A. cornutus

Binomial name
- Astrococcus cornutus Benth.

Genus of flowering plants

Astrococcus is a genus of plant of the family Euphorbiaceae first described as a genus in 1854. It contains only one known species, Astrococcus cornutus, native to neighboring states of identical names, Amazonas State in southern Venezuela and Amazonas State in northwestern Brazil.

Species formerly included

moved to Haematostemon

- Astrococcus coriaceus Baill., synonym of Haematostemon coriaceus (Baill.) Pax & K.Hoffm.
