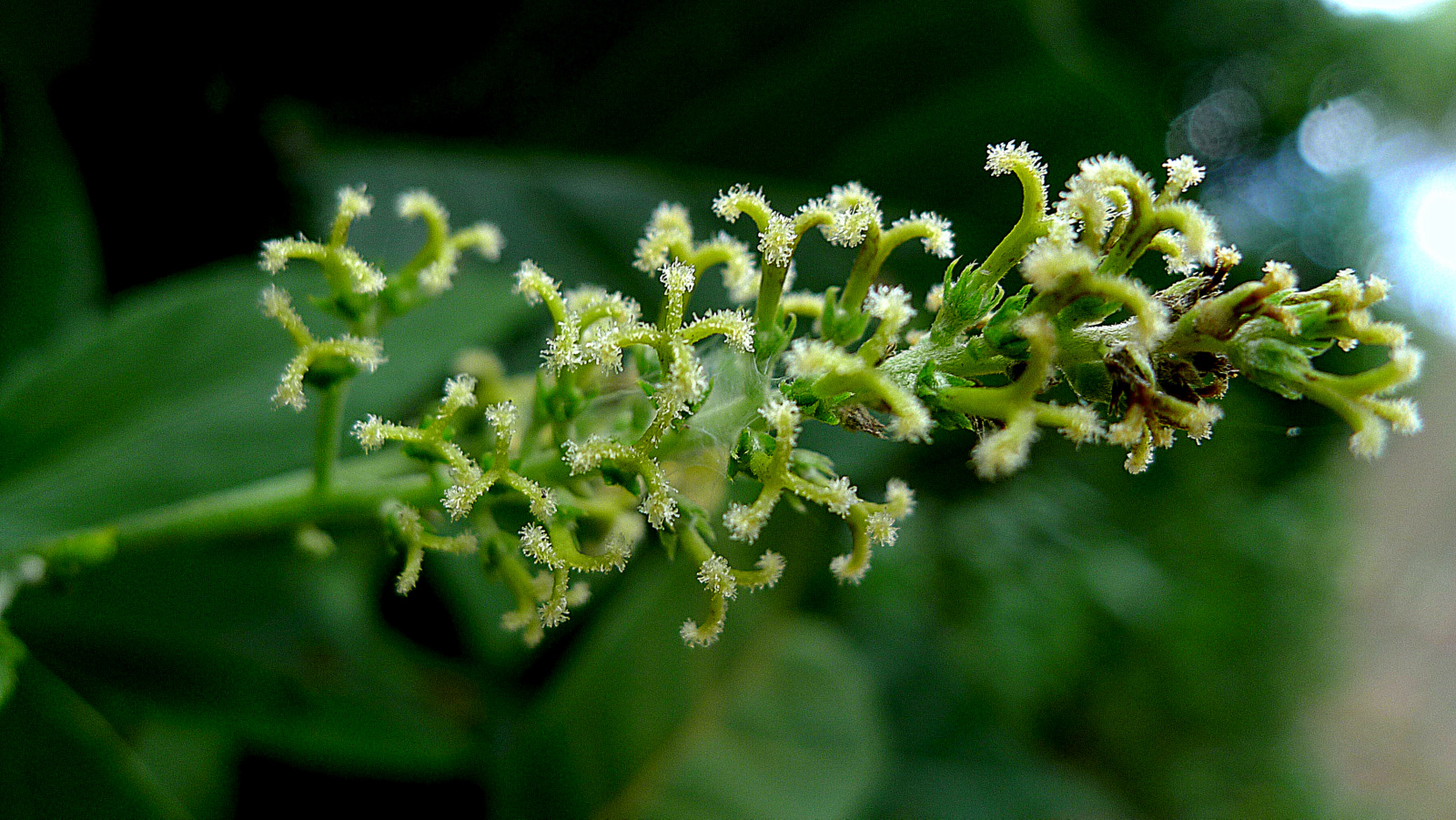
- Bia alienata

Scientific classification
- Kingdom: Plantae
- Clade: Tracheophytes
- Clade: Angiosperms
- Clade: Eudicots
- Clade: Rosids
- Order: Malpighiales
- Family: Euphorbiaceae
- Subfamily: Acalyphoideae
- Tribe: Plukenetieae
- Subtribe: Tragiinae
- Genus: Bia; Klotzsch

Type species
- Bia sellowiana (syn. of B. alienata) Klotzsch

= Bia (plant) =

Genus of flowering plants

Bia is a genus of plant of the family Euphorbiaceae first described as a genus in 1841. The entire genus is native to South America.

Species

1. Bia alienata Didr. - Brazil, Bolivia, Paraguay, N Argentina
2. Bia capivarensis Medeiros & Alves - Serra da Capivara
3. Bia fallax (Müll.Arg.) G.L.Webster - Peru, Rondônia
4. Bia fendleri (Müll.Arg.) G.L.Webster - Guyana, Venezuela, Amazonas State of Brazil
5. Bia lessertiana Baill. - Fr Guiana, Suriname, Guyana, N Brazil
6. Bia manuelii V.W. Steinm. & Ram.-Amezcua, 2013, Sierra de Coalcomán, Michoacán, Mexico

formerly included

moved to Zuckertia

- Bia cordata - Zuckertia cordata
