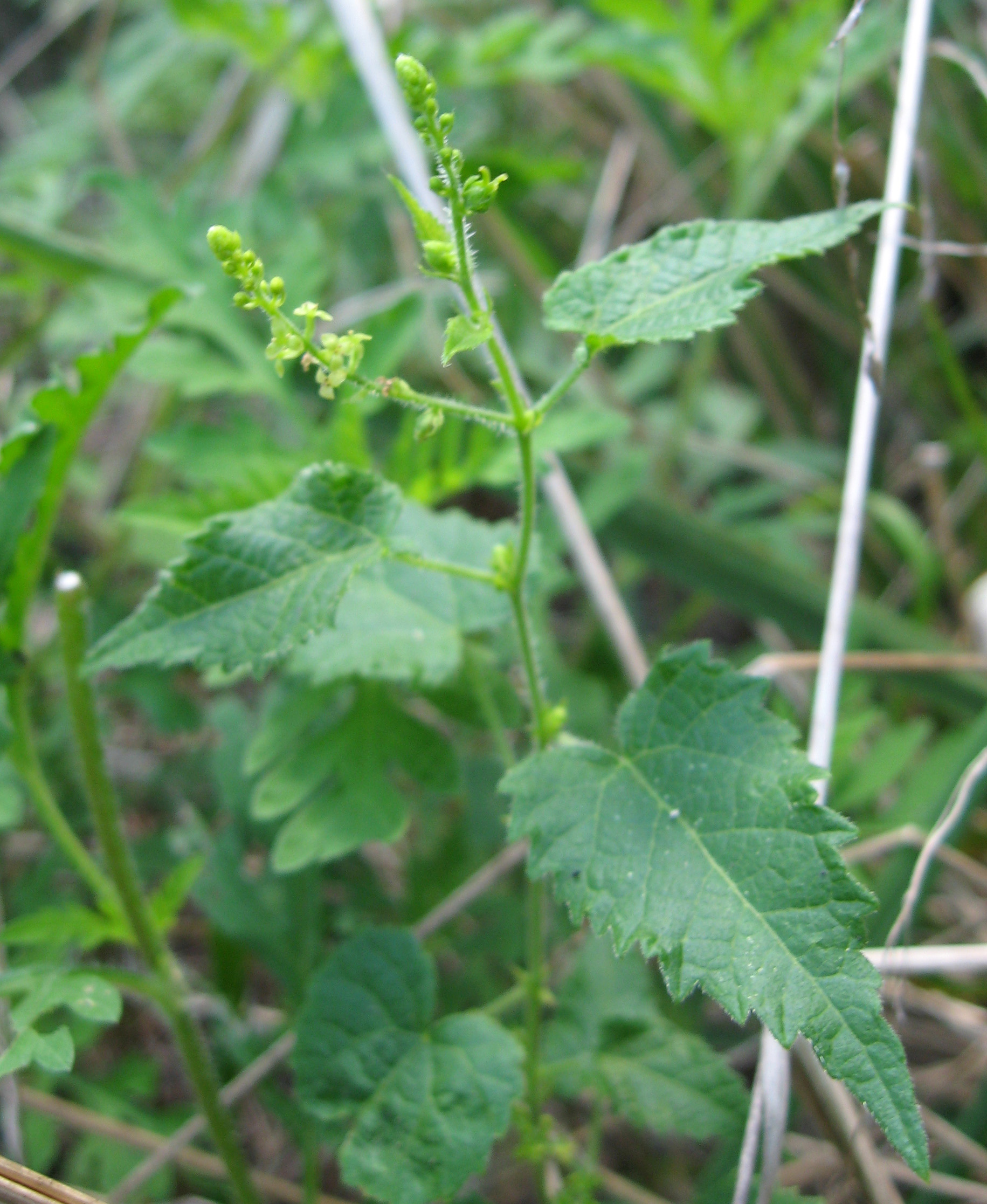

Scientific classification
- Kingdom: Plantae
- Clade: Tracheophytes
- Clade: Angiosperms
- Clade: Eudicots
- Clade: Rosids
- Order: Malpighiales
- Family: Euphorbiaceae
- Genus: Tragia
- Species: T. cordata

Binomial name
- Tragia cordata Michx.

= Tragia cordata =

Species of flowering plant

Tragia cordata, commonly called the heartleaf noseburn, is a species of herbaceous plant in the spurge family. It is native to North America, where it is found scattered in the southeastern United States. Its natural habitat is in rocky calcareous woodlands and prairies.

This species is notable for its intensely painful stinging hairs. It is readily distinguished from other Tragia in the east by its vining habit and large heart-shaped leaves. It produces small green flowers in the summer and early fall.
