= Angostylis =

Scientific classification
- Kingdom: Plantae
- Clade: Tracheophytes
- Clade: Angiosperms
- Clade: Eudicots
- Clade: Rosids
- Order: Malpighiales
- Family: Euphorbiaceae
- Subfamily: Acalyphoideae
- Tribe: Plukenetieae
- Subtribe: Plukenetiinae
- Genus: Angostylis; Benth.

Type species
- Angostylis longifolia Benth.

Synonyms
- Angostyles Benth., spelling variant

Genus of flowering plants

Angostylis is a genus of flowering plants in the family Euphorbiaceae, first described in 1854. The genus is native to northern South America (Suriname and northern Brazil).

As of 2019, there are two species in the genus Angostylis:

1. Angostylis longifolia Benth. – northern Brazil
2. Angostylis tabulamontana Croizat – Suriname
