= Cnesmone =

Scientific classification
- Kingdom: Plantae
- Clade: Tracheophytes
- Clade: Angiosperms
- Clade: Eudicots
- Clade: Rosids
- Order: Malpighiales
- Family: Euphorbiaceae
- Subfamily: Acalyphoideae
- Tribe: Plukenetieae
- Subtribe: Tragiinae
- Genus: Cnesmone; Blume

Synonyms
- Cenesmon Gagnep.; Cnesmosa Blume, spelling variant

Genus of flowering plants

Cnesmone is a genus of plant of the family Euphorbiaceae first described as a genus in 1826. It is native to southern China and to much of Southeast Asia (Indochina, Philippines, Indonesia, etc.).

Species

1. Cnesmone anisosepala - Hainan
2. Cnesmone hainanensis - Hainan
3. Cnesmone javanica - Arunachal Pradesh, Bhutan, Assam, N Bangladesh, Indochina, Andaman & Nicobar, Malaysia, W Indonesia
4. Cnesmone laevis - S Thailand, Langkawi
5. Cnesmone laotica - Laos, Cambodia, Thailand
6. Cnesmone linearis - Vietnam
7. Cnesmone mairei - Yunnan
8. Cnesmone peltata - Vietnam
9. Cnesmone philippinensis - Philippines
10. Cnesmone poilanei - Vietnam
11. Cnesmone subpeltata - Peninsular Malaysia

formerly included

moved to Megistostigma

- Cnesmone glabrata - Megistostigma glabratum
