= Tragia balfourii =

Conservation status
- Least Concern (IUCN 3.1)

Scientific classification
- Kingdom: Plantae
- Clade: Tracheophytes
- Clade: Angiosperms
- Clade: Eudicots
- Clade: Rosids
- Order: Malpighiales
- Family: Euphorbiaceae
- Genus: Tragia
- Species: T. balfourii

Binomial name
- Tragia balfourii Prain

Synonyms
- Tragia balfouriana J.B.Gillett ex G.B.Popov, nom. illeg.; Tragia dioica Balf.f., nom. illeg.

Species of plant

Tragia balfourii is a species of plant in the family Euphorbiaceae. It is endemic to Socotra in Yemen. Its natural habitat is subtropical or tropical dry forests.
