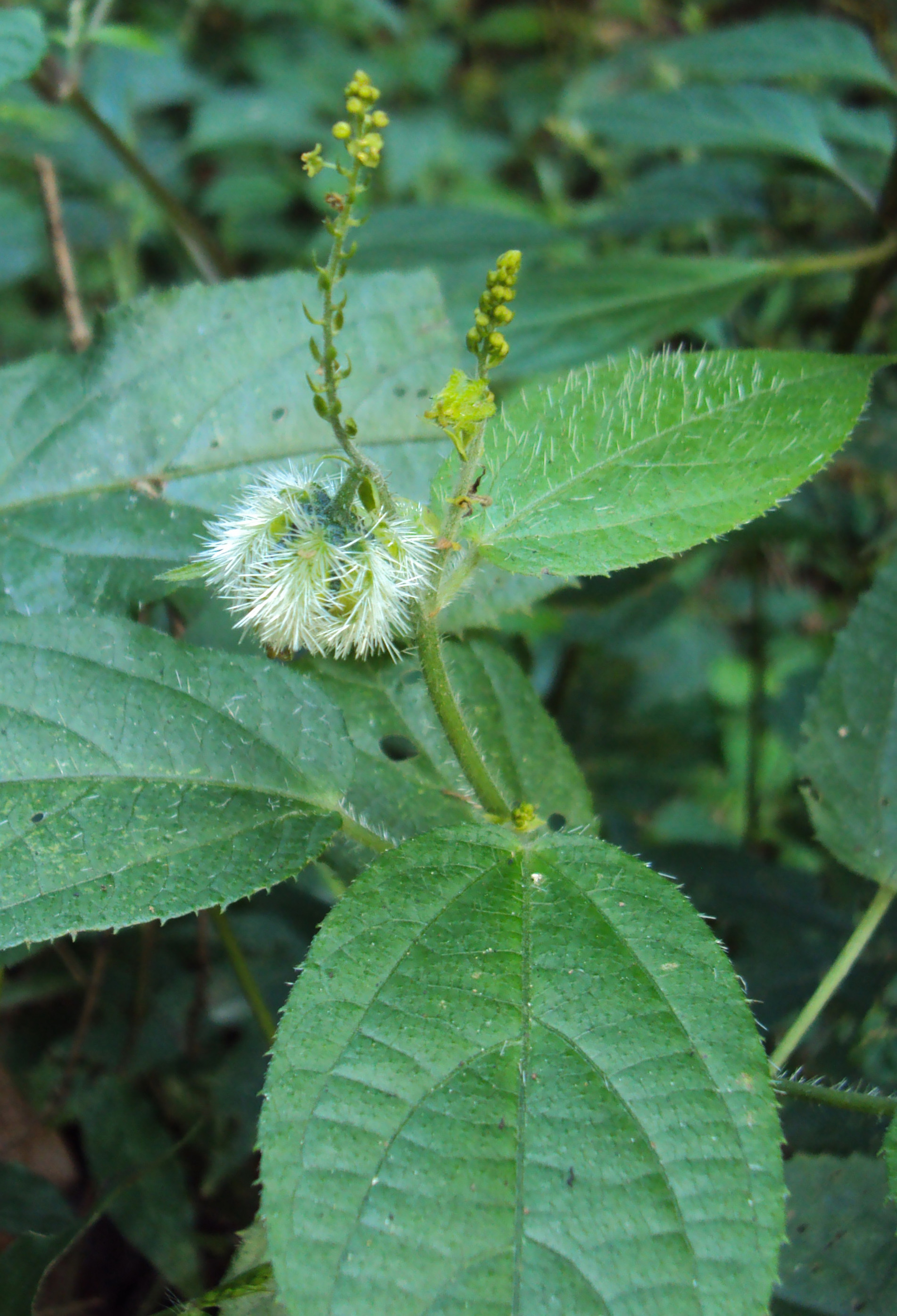

Scientific classification
- Kingdom: Plantae
- Clade: Tracheophytes
- Clade: Angiosperms
- Clade: Eudicots
- Clade: Rosids
- Order: Malpighiales
- Family: Euphorbiaceae
- Genus: Tragia
- Species: T. involucrata

Binomial name
- Tragia involucrata L.

= Tragia involucrata =

Species of flowering plant

Tragia involucrata, the Indian stinging nettle, is a species of plant in the family Euphorbiaceae. It is the most used species of Tragia in ethnomedicinal and ethnopharmacological applications.

== Description ==
Tragia involvucrata is a slender, twining herb with stinging hairs. Leaves 6-10 x 3-5.5 cm, ovate or elliptic, base acute or rounded, margin serrate, apex acuminate, hispidulous on both sides; petiole to 2.5 cm long. Spikes axillary, monoecious, to 2 cm long; male flowers above, female flowers 1-2, at the base. Male flowers c. 1.5 mm across; bracts spathulate; tepals 3, spreading; stamens 3, anthers subsessile. Female flowers c. 3 mm across, ebracteate; tepals 6, c. 1 mm long, ovate-lanceolate, enlarged and spreading in fruits; style 3, spreading. Capsule c. 0.6 x 1 cm, 3-lobed, hispid. Seeds globose.

== Common names ==
- Assamese: Dumuni Chorat
- Bengali: বিছুটি পাতা Bichuti paataa and in regions of North Bengal it is called Chotra paataa
- English: Indian stinging nettle, climbing nettle, canchorie root-plant
- Hindi: पीत पर्णी Pit Parni, बढन्त Barhanta
- Kannada: ತುರಿಕೆ ಬಳ್ಳಿ Turike Balli
- Maithili: कबाछु (transliteration - kabaachhu)
- Malayalam: Kodithumba, Cherukodithuva, Choriyanam, ചൊറിയണം Coriyanam, Kodithoova
- Marathi: लघुमेडशिंगी Laghumedhshingi, चुरकी Churki
- Nepali: उट कटेरी Ut Kateri
- Odia: ବିଛୁଆତି (transliteration Bichhuati), Kasalakku
- Sanskrit: दुःस्पर्ष Duhsparsha, वृश्चिकाच्छद Vrischikacchad, वृश्चिकापत्री Vrischikapatri, वृश्चिकाली Vrischikali, आगमावर्ता Aagmavarta, कषाग्निः Kashagnih
- Sinhala: වැල් කහඹිලියා Wel Kahambiliya
- Tamil: காஞ்சொறி Kanchori / செந்தட்டி Senthatti
- Telugu: తేలుకొండిచెట్టు Telukondicettu, Duradagunda aaku.
