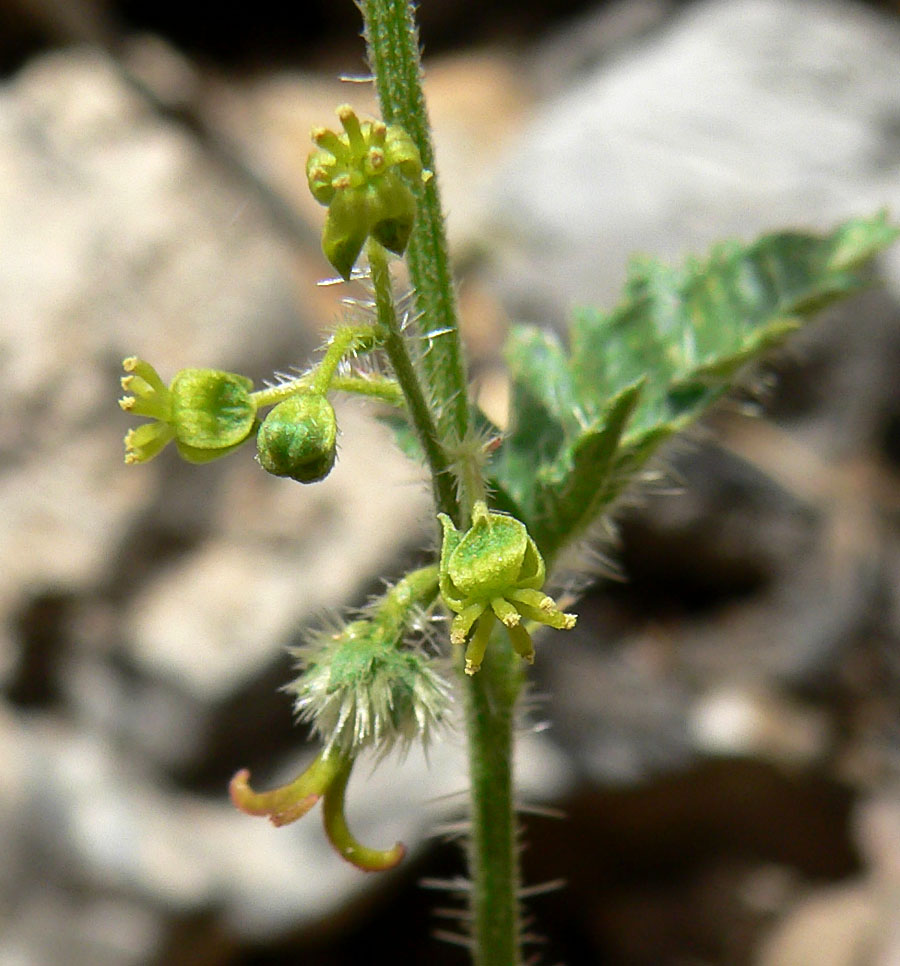

Conservation status
- Secure (NatureServe)

Scientific classification
- Kingdom: Plantae
- Clade: Tracheophytes
- Clade: Angiosperms
- Clade: Eudicots
- Clade: Rosids
- Order: Malpighiales
- Family: Euphorbiaceae
- Genus: Tragia
- Species: T. ramosa

Binomial name
- Tragia ramosa Torr.

= Tragia ramosa =

Species of flowering plant

Tragia ramosa is a species of flowering plant in the spurge family known by the common names branched noseburn, and desert tragia.

It is native to the southern Great Plains, South Central, and Southwestern United States and Northern Mexico. It grows in scrub, woodland, and other desert and plateau habitat.

== Description ==
Tragia ramosa is a perennial herb growing mostly erect, measuring 10 to 30 centimeters in maximum height. It is covered in long, rough stinging hairs. The leaves have lance-shaped or oval blades with toothed edges, which are borne on petioles.

The plant is monoecious. Its inflorescence contains a few male flowers and usually one female flower. The flowers lack petals but have green sepals.

The female flower yields a small capsule.
