= Bia capivarensis =

Scientific classification
- Kingdom: Plantae
- Clade: Tracheophytes
- Clade: Angiosperms
- Clade: Eudicots
- Clade: Rosids
- Order: Malpighiales
- Family: Euphorbiaceae
- Genus: Bia
- Species: B. capivarensis

Binomial name
- Bia capivarensis D.Medeiros, L.Senna & R.J.V.Alves

Species of flowering plant

Bia capivarensis is a species of flowering plant in the spurge family, Euphorbiaceae. It is native to the Serra da Capivara National Park in Brazil.
