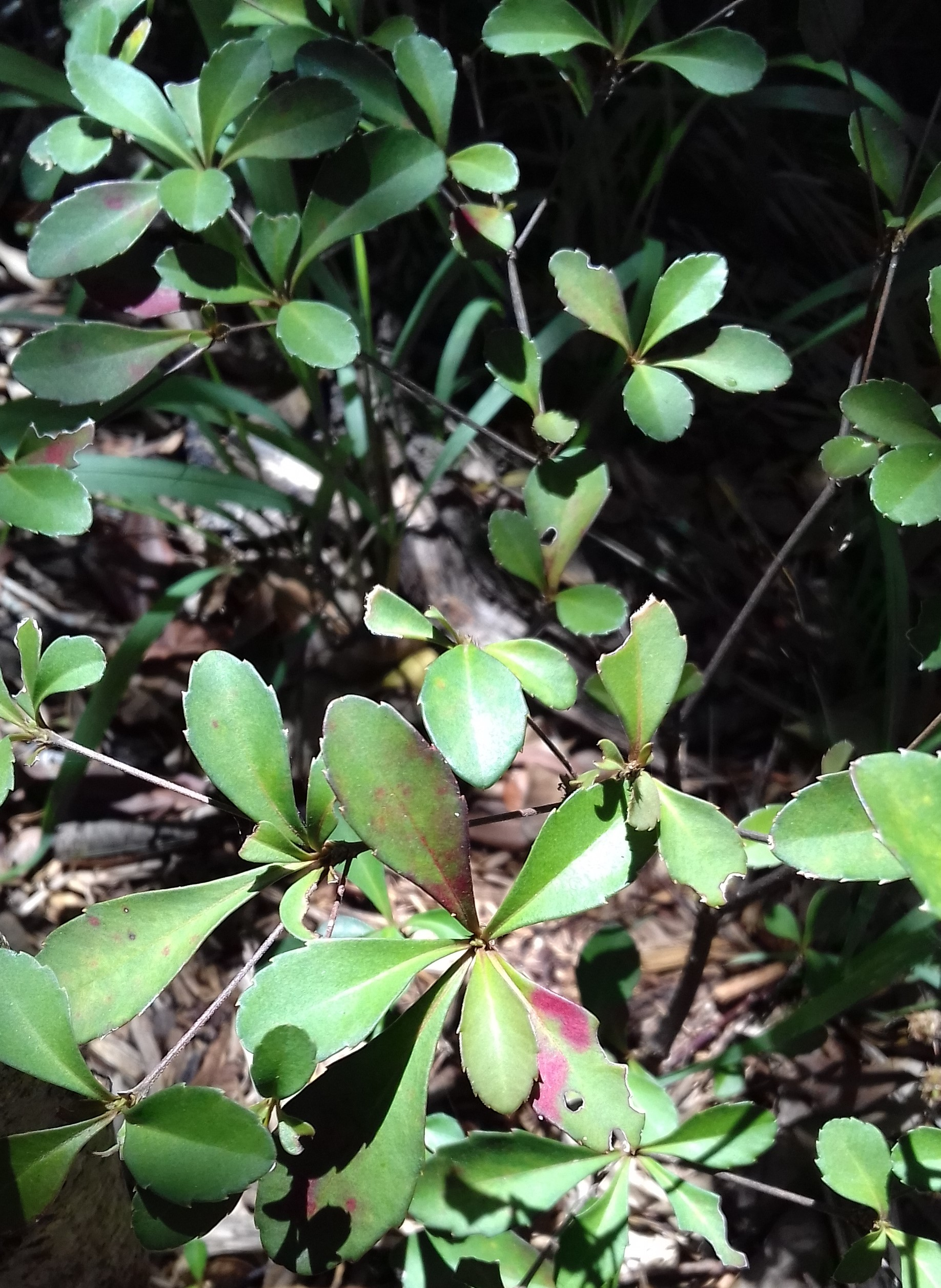
- Cleidion verticillatum

Scientific classification
- Kingdom: Plantae
- Clade: Tracheophytes
- Clade: Angiosperms
- Clade: Eudicots
- Clade: Rosids
- Order: Malpighiales
- Family: Euphorbiaceae
- Subfamily: Acalyphoideae
- Tribe: Acalypheae
- Subtribe: Cleidiinae
- Genus: Cleidion; Blume

Synonyms
- Lasiostyles C. Presl; Psilostachys Turcz.; Redia Casar.; Tetraglossa Bedd.

= Cleidion =

Genus of flowering plants

Cleidion is a plant genus of the family Euphorbiaceae, first described in 1826. It is found in tropical and subtropical regions in Asia, Africa, Australia, Latin America, and various islands of the Pacific and Indian Oceans.

Species

1. Cleidion amazonicum – Bolivia, Peru, NW Brazil
2. Cleidion bracteosum – Vietnam
3. Cleidion brevipetiolatum – S China, N Indochina
4. Cleidion capuronii – Madagascar
5. Cleidion castaneifolium – S Mexico, Central America, NW South America
6. Cleidion claoxyloides – New Caledonia
7. Cleidion gabonicum – W + C Africa
8. Cleidion javanicum – Indian Subcontinent, S China, SE Asia, Papuasia, Queensland
9. Cleidion lasiophyllum – New Caledonia
10. Cleidion lemurum – New Caledonia
11. Cleidion leptostachyum – Fiji
12. Cleidion lochmios – New Caledonia
13. Cleidion luziae – Solomon Islands
14. Cleidion macarangoides – New Caledonia
15. Cleidion macrophyllum – New Caledonia
16. Cleidion marginatum – New Caledonia
17. Cleidion megistophyllum – Luzon
18. Cleidion microcarpum – Philippines
19. Cleidion minahassae – Sulawesi
20. Cleidion moniliflorum – New Britain
21. Cleidion neoebudicum – Vanuatu
22. Cleidion nitidum – S India, Sri Lanka, Andaman Islands
23. Cleidion papuanum – Papuasia
24. Cleidion ramosii – Philippines
25. Cleidion sessile – Palau
26. Cleidion spathulatum – New Caledonia
27. Cleidion taynguyenense – Vietnam
28. Cleidion tricoccum – Brazil, Bolivia
29. Cleidion veillonii – New Caledonia
30. Cleidion velutinum – New Caledonia
31. Cleidion verticillatum – New Caledonia incl. Îsle des Pins + Loyalty Islands
32. Cleidion vieillardii – New Caledonia

formerly included

moved to other genera (Acalypha, Acidoton, Adenophaedra, Alchornea, Bocquillonia, Cleidiocarpon, Conceveiba, Macaranga, Orfilea, Plukenetia, Trigonostemon)

1. C. bishnui – Cleidiocarpon laurinum
2. C. cafcaf – Orfilea neraudiana
3. C. coriaceum – Macaranga coriacea
4. C. denticulatum – Adenophaedra grandifolia
5. C. lutescens – Macaranga lutescens
6. C. mannii – Plukenetia conophora
7. C. nicaraguense – Acidoton nicaraguensis
8. C. platystigma – Bocquillonia codonostylis
9. C. praealtum – Conceveiba praealta
10. C. preussii – Plukenetia conophora
11. C. spiciflorum – Acalypha spiciflora
12. C. tenuispica – Macaranga vieillardii
13. C. ulmifolium – Alchornea ulmifolia
14. C. xyphophylloides – Trigonostemon xyphophylloides
