= Plukenetiinae =

Scientific classification
- Kingdom: Plantae
- Clade: Tracheophytes
- Clade: Angiosperms
- Clade: Eudicots
- Clade: Rosids
- Order: Malpighiales
- Family: Euphorbiaceae
- Subfamily: Acalyphoideae
- Tribe: Plukenetieae
- Subtribe: Plukenetiinae

Genera
- Angostylis; Astrococcus; Haematostemon; Plukenetia; Romanoa

Subtribe of flowering plants

Plukenetiinae is one of three subtribes of plant of tribe Plukenetieae.
