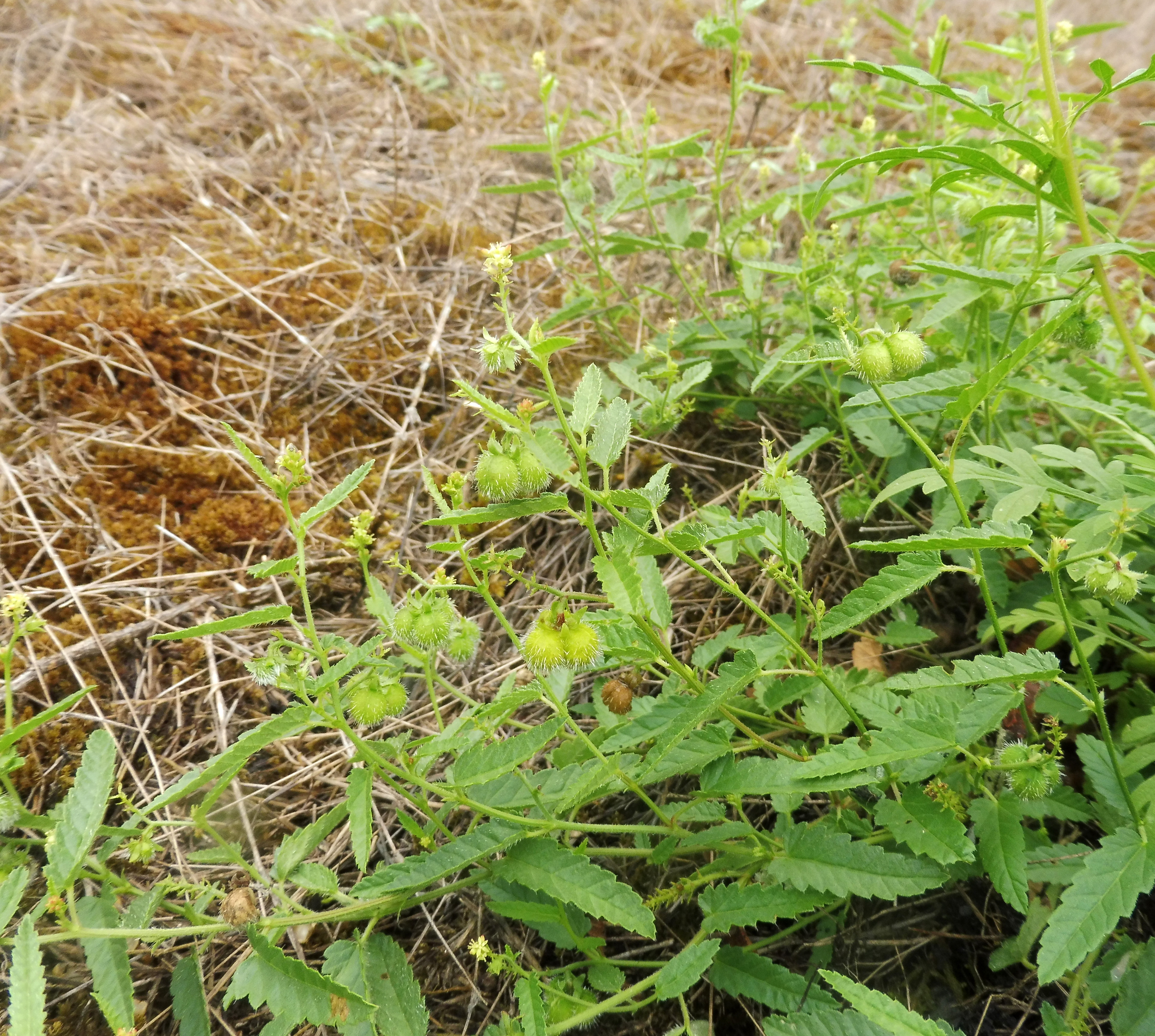

Scientific classification
- Kingdom: Plantae
- Clade: Tracheophytes
- Clade: Angiosperms
- Clade: Eudicots
- Clade: Rosids
- Order: Malpighiales
- Family: Euphorbiaceae
- Genus: Tragia
- Species: T. betonicifolia

Binomial name
- Tragia betonicifolia Nutt.

= Tragia betonicifolia =

Species of flowering plant

Tragia betonicifolia, commonly called betonyleaf noseburn, is a species of flowering plant in the spurge family (Euphorbiaceae). It is native to North America, where it is primarily found in the South-Central region of the United States extending north into Kansas and Missouri, with disjunct populations east in Tennessee. Its typical natural habitat is dry areas with sandy or rocky soil, in glades, prairies, bluffs, and dry woodlands.

Tragia betonicifolia is a perennial herb or subshrub. Its leaves are triangular-lanceolate, truncate to cordate at the base, with an acute tip. Its petioles are around 10–40 mm. It produces small yellow flowers from late spring through summer. Tragia betonicifolia can be distinguished from the similar looking Tragia urticifolia by its shorter pedicels on staminate flowers (with the persistent base only reaching 0.6 mm), and its more distally clustered flowers in the raceme. In addition, Tragia betonicifolia typically has more branches from the base of the stem.

Tragia betonicifolia has stinging hairs that are painful when touched.
