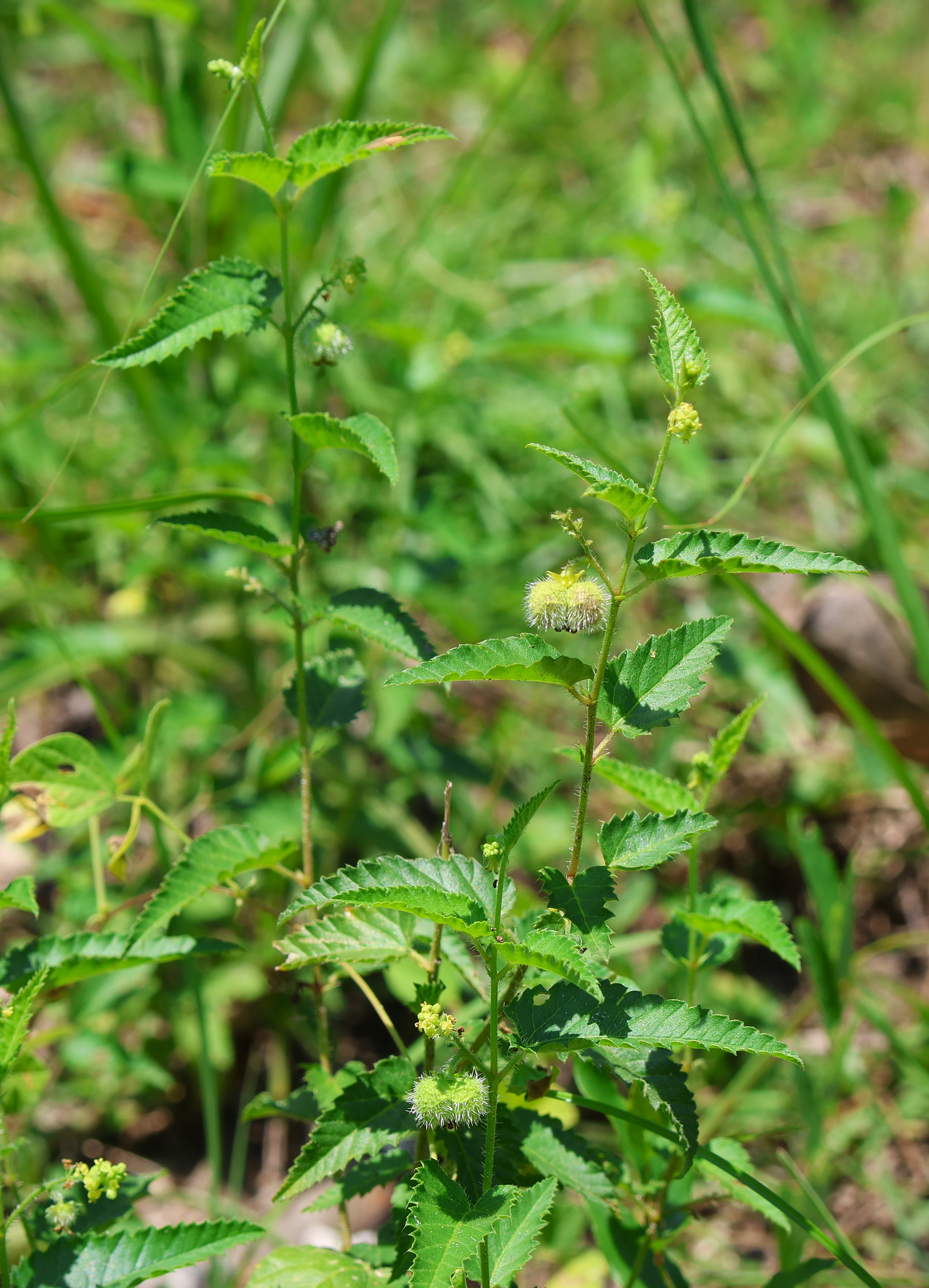
- Growing in roadside limestone glade maintained by mowing - Annutteliga Hammock, Hernando County, FL

Conservation status
- Secure (NatureServe)

Scientific classification
- Kingdom: Plantae
- Clade: Embryophytes
- Clade: Tracheophytes
- Clade: Angiosperms
- Clade: Eudicots
- Clade: Rosids
- Order: Malpighiales
- Family: Euphorbiaceae
- Genus: Tragia
- Species: T. urticifolia

Binomial name
- Tragia urticifolia Michx., 1803

= Tragia urticifolia =

Species of flowering plant

Tragia urticifolia, commonly called nettleleaf noseburn, is a species of flowering plant in the spurge family (Euphorbiaceae). It is native to southeastern United States. Its typical natural habitat is in rocky or sandy dry woodlands, over calcareous or mafic substrates.

Tragia urticifolia is an erect perennial herb or subshrub. Its leaves are triangular-lanceolate, truncate to cordate at the base, with an acute to acuminate tip. Its petioles are around 3–15 mm. It produces small yellow flowers from late spring through summer. Tragia urticifolia can be distinguished from the similar looking Tragia betonicifolia by its longer pedicels on staminate flowers (1.5–2 mm), which are more evenly distributed in the raceme.

This species is notable for having stinging hairs that are very painful upon contact with skin.

== Gallery ==
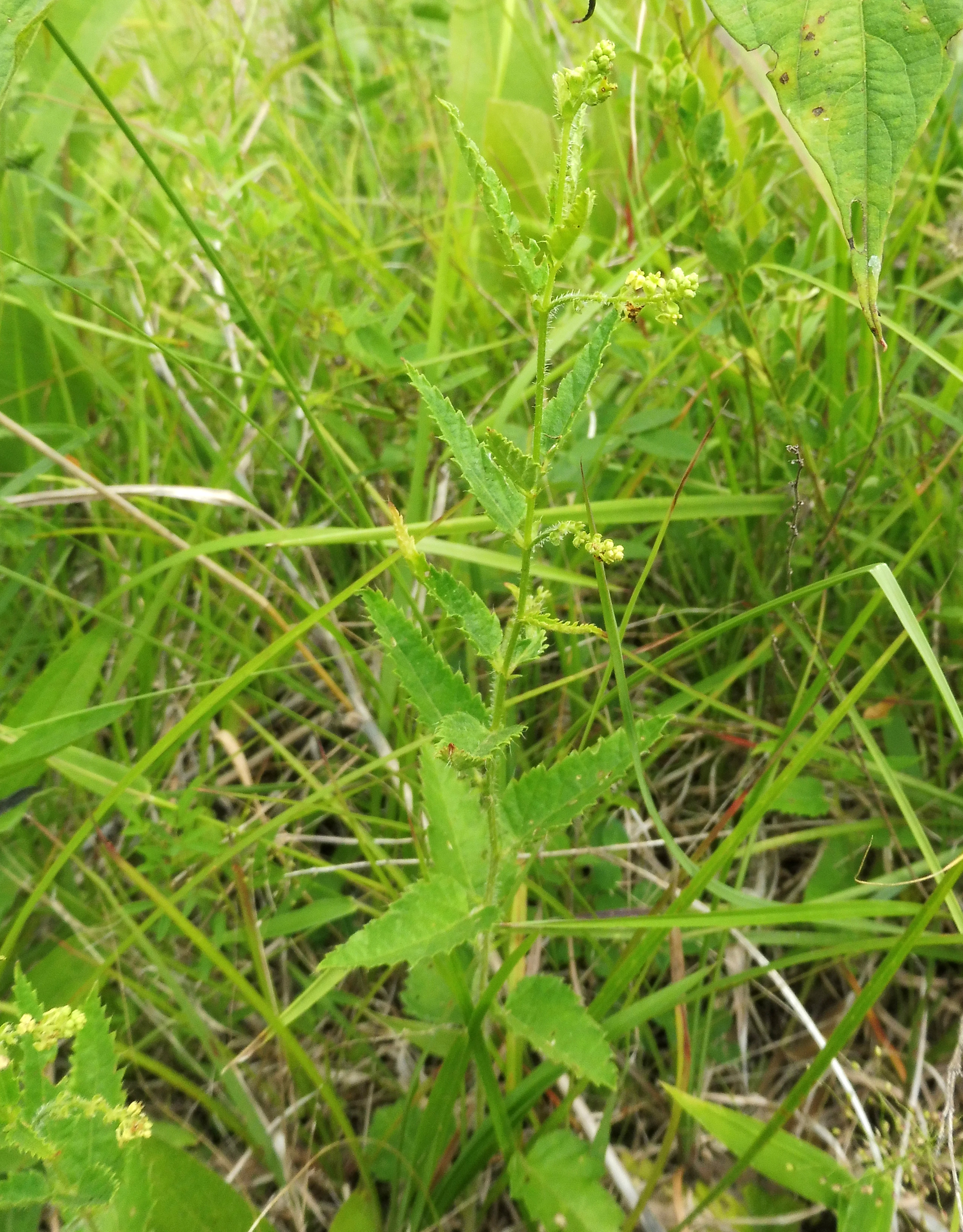
Growing in high quality dry calcareous barren in north-central Alabama
