= Plukenetia conophora =

Scientific classification
- Kingdom: Plantae
- Clade: Tracheophytes
- Clade: Angiosperms
- Clade: Eudicots
- Clade: Rosids
- Order: Malpighiales
- Family: Euphorbiaceae
- Genus: Plukenetia
- Species: P. conophora

Binomial name
- Plukenetia conophora Müll.Arg.

Synonyms
- Tetracarpidium conophorum (Müll.Arg.) Hutch. & Dalziel

Species of shrub

Plukenetia conophora, also called Nigerian walnut, and conophore, is a climbing shrub in the genus Plukenetia. It is not related to the walnut, being so named because its nuts bear a superficial resemblance to the walnut. It is native to tropical western and central Africa from Togo to Congo and in Sierra Leone. It is abundant in the Nigeria, Cameroon, Republic of the Congo and Democratic Republic of Congo. It prefers rain-forest hedge in half-shady places; low bush; secondary forest; plantations at elevations from 250–1,400 m (820–4,590 ft). Although it is well recorded in Sierra Leone, it is apparently not indigenous to Sierra Leone, since it is not recorded in Liberia and Ghana. Its presence in Sierra Leone is due to returning slaves for it is known to the Krio by its Yoruba (Nigerian) name. Plukenetia conophora is the only Plukenetia species native to West Africa or Central Africa. Other Plukenetia species are indigenous to other parts of Africa, the Indian subcontinent, Southeast Asia, and America.

== Description ==
It produces stems usually 3–15 m (9.8–49.2 ft) long, though they can be up to 30 m (98 ft) long. The seed is thin-shelled and about 25 mm (0.98 in) long. It is contained in a pod which may house;one shelled nut (single), two shelled nut (double) and three shelled nut. The walnut shells could be black or brown from the plant. The nut is whitish upon cracking from the shell. The nut has a thin layer in between two halves (when a nut is divided into two equal parts) of nut.

== Taxonomy ==
Plukenetia conophora belongs to the family Euphorbiaceae in the order Malpighiales of angiosperms in the plant kingdom. Euphorbiaceae is a large family of flowering plants with about 300 genera and 7,500 species. Members of the family are generally called spurge. This family occurs mainly in the tropics, with the majority of the species in the tropical America and Indo-Malayan regions. A large variety occurs in tropical Africa, but they are not as abundant or varied as in the two other tropical regions. However, Euphorbiaceae also has many species in nontropical areas such as the Mediterranean Basin, the Middle East, South Africa and southern USA. Of the three subfamilies of Euphorbiaceae – Acalyphoideae, Crotonoideae and Euphorbioideae; only Acalyphoideae is native to Africa.

The genus Plukenetia (Euphorbiaceae) is a pantropical genus of 19 species belonging to the tribe Plukenetieae of the subfamily Acalyphoideae. Three sections or species groups of genus Plukenetia have been recognized. The two previously named genera, Tetracarpidium (synonym Angostylidium) and Hedraiostylus (synonym Pterococcus), are now treated as sections of Plukenetia. The monotypic Plukenetia sect. Tetracarpidium (Angostylidium) includes the African species Plukenetia conophora, while Plukenetia sect. Hedraiostylus (Pterococcus) comprises two African species (Plukenetia africana and Plukenetia procumbens) and one Asian species (Plukenetia corniculata). A third species group restricted to Madagascar comprises three species; Plukenetia madagascariensis, Plukenetia deciduas, and Plukenetia ankaranensis. However, Plukenetia conophora is still, in some literature, erroneously referred to by the genus Tetracarpidium.

== Uses ==
=== Food ===
Plukenetia conophora is an important crop due to its multiple uses. Plukenetia conophora is widely cultivated for its nuts, which are cooked and consumed as snacks and often served with corn or rice. In West Africa, especially in Nigeria and Sierra Leone, as well as in Central African countries such as Cameroon, the seeds provide income to the rural people thereby improving their economy. Eaten boiled, it has a bitter aftertaste, usually observed upon drinking water. The seed can be ground into a powder and used with flour in making cakes. The nut, eaten raw, has a bitter taste comparable to that of kola nut.

The nuts can also be roasted and eaten in the general diet, or added to cakes. The nuts are oil-bearing yielding 48–60% of a light golden colored oil with a taste resembling linseed oil. The oil is edible, although it not suitable for frying or soap manufacture, due to its quick drying property.

The leaves are also edible and are often eaten with rice.

=== Traditional medicine ===
In Gabon, consumption of the seeds by husbands of pregnant women is believed to mitigate the risk of miscarriage. The fresh nuts are believed to be a snake antivenin.

=== Other uses ===
The oil has thus been found useful in the formulation of wood vanish, stand oil, vulcanized oil for leather and rubber substitute.

== Local names ==
- Awusa, Asala in Yoruba, Nigeria
- Ukpa in Igbo, Nigeria
- Kaso, Ngak in Cameroon
