= Platygyna =

Scientific classification
- Kingdom: Plantae
- Clade: Tracheophytes
- Clade: Angiosperms
- Clade: Eudicots
- Clade: Rosids
- Order: Malpighiales
- Family: Euphorbiaceae
- Subfamily: Acalyphoideae
- Tribe: Plukenetieae
- Subtribe: Tragiinae
- Genus: Platygyna; Mercier

Synonyms
- Acanthocaulon Klotzsch ex Endl.

Genus of flowering plants

Platygyna is a genus of plant of the family Euphorbiaceae, first described as a genus in 1830. It is native to Cuba and Haiti in the West Indies.

Species

1. Platygyna dentata Alain - SE Cuba
2. Platygyna hexandra (Jacq.) Müll.Arg. - Cuba, Haiti
3. Platygyna leonis Alain - E Cuba
4. Platygyna obovata Borhidi - E Cuba
5. Platygyna parvifolia Alain - E Cuba
6. Platygyna triandra Borhidi - E Cuba
7. Platygyna volubilis Howard - E Cuba
