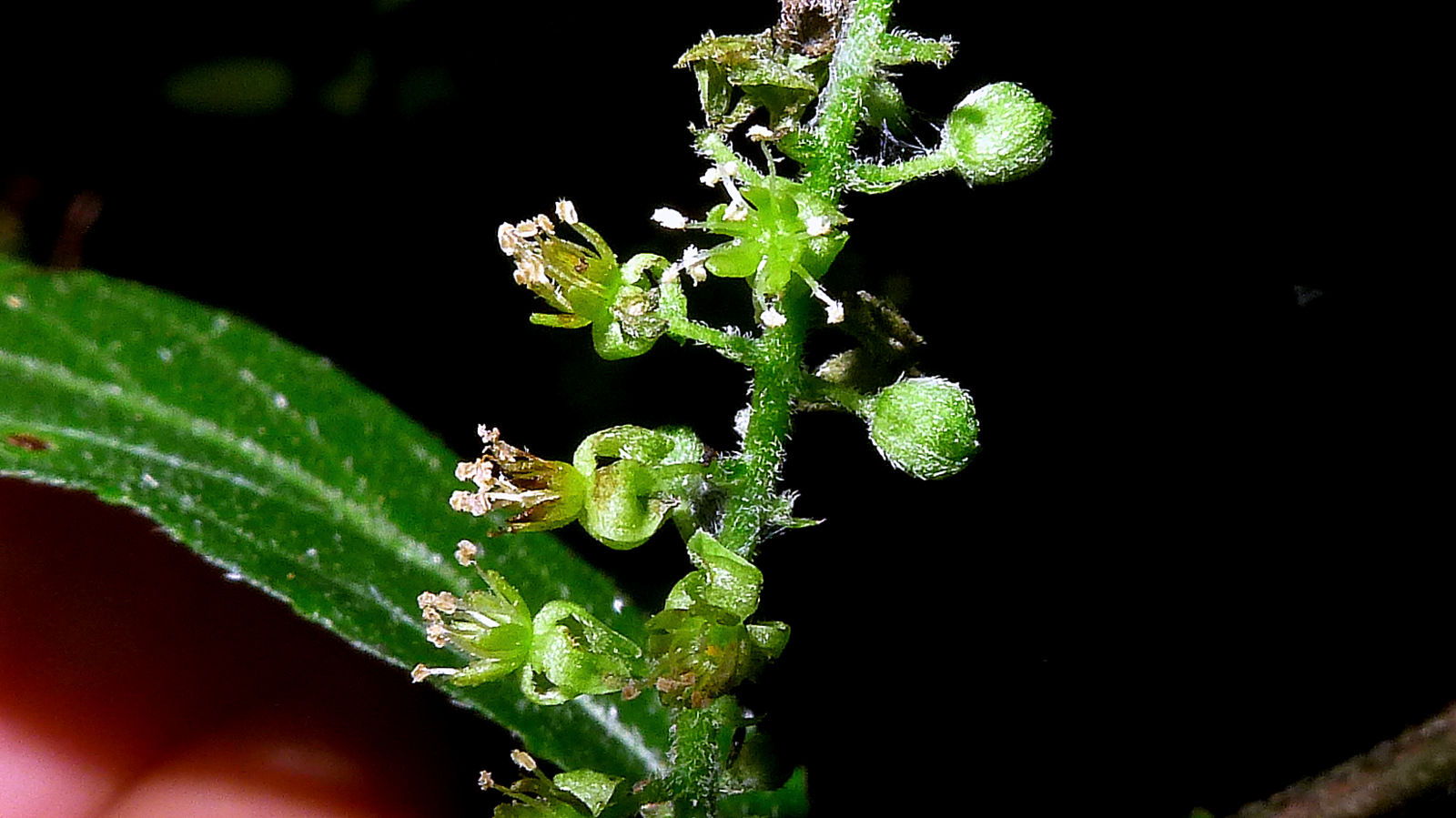
- Bia alienata

Scientific classification
- Kingdom: Plantae
- Clade: Tracheophytes
- Clade: Angiosperms
- Clade: Eudicots
- Clade: Rosids
- Order: Malpighiales
- Family: Euphorbiaceae
- Genus: Bia
- Species: B. alienata

Binomial name
- Bia alienata Didr.

= Bia alienata =

Species of flowering plant

Bia alienata is a species of flowering plant in the spurge family, Euphorbiaceae. It is native to Brazil, Bolivia, Paraguay and northern Argentina.
