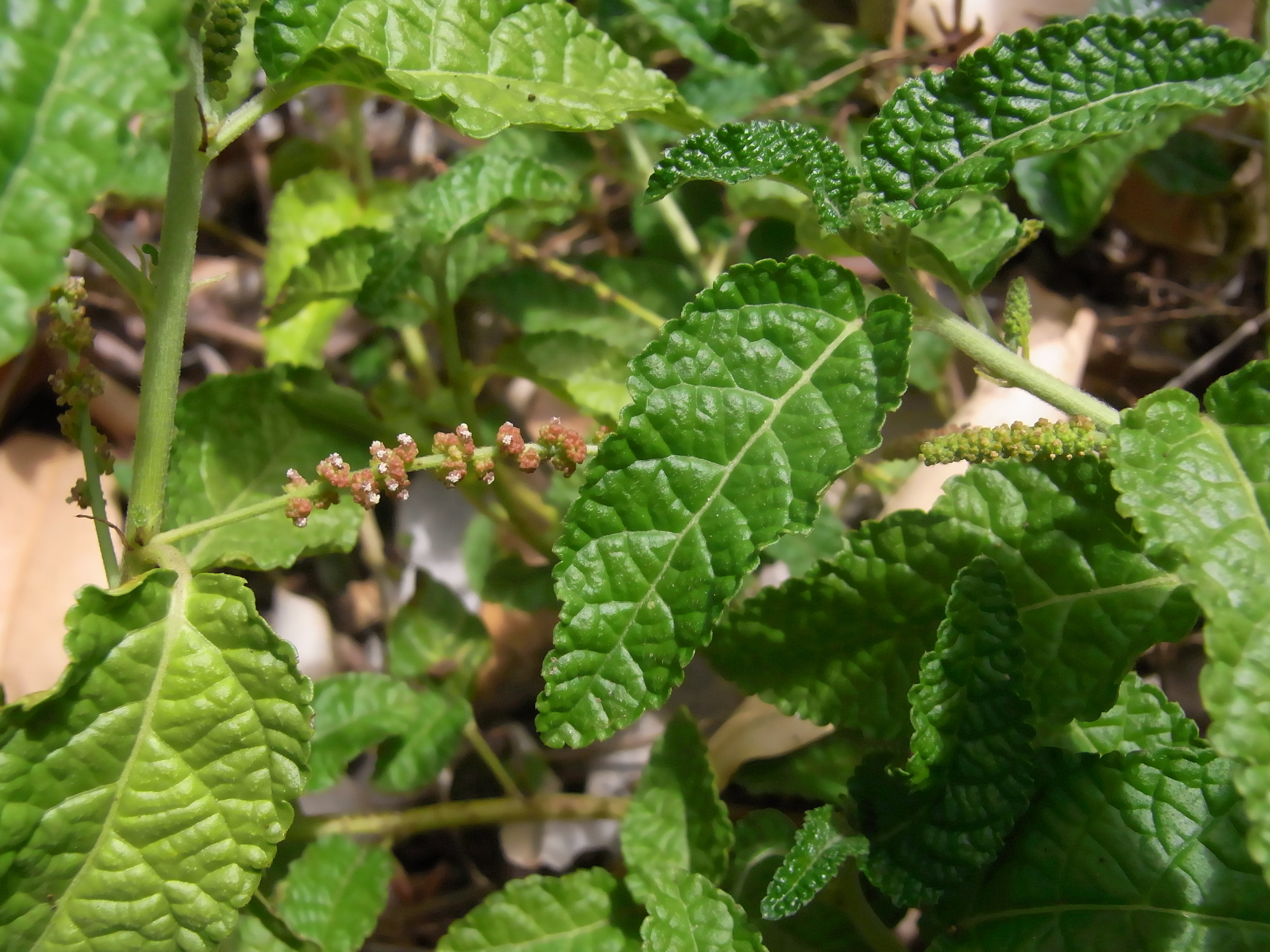

Scientific classification
- Kingdom: Plantae
- Clade: Tracheophytes
- Clade: Angiosperms
- Clade: Eudicots
- Clade: Rosids
- Order: Malpighiales
- Family: Euphorbiaceae
- Genus: Acalypha
- Species: A. nemorum

Binomial name
- Acalypha nemorum F.Muell. ex Mull.Arg.

= Acalypha nemorum =

Species of flowering plant

Acalypha nemorum is a species of flowering plant in the spurge family, Euphorbiaceae. Mostly found growing in rainforests in New South Wales and Queensland, Australia. Usually seen as a shrub, but it may also grow in a prostrate form on headlands beside the ocean.
