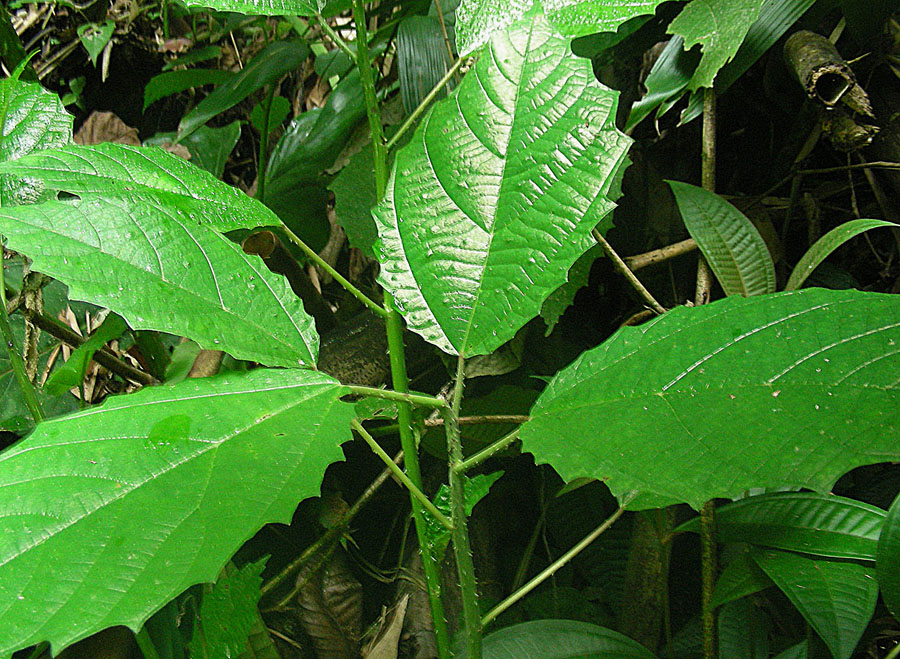

Scientific classification
- Kingdom: Plantae
- Clade: Embryophytes
- Clade: Tracheophytes
- Clade: Angiosperms
- Clade: Eudicots
- Clade: Rosids
- Order: Malpighiales
- Family: Euphorbiaceae
- Genus: Tragia
- Species: T. volubilis

Binomial name
- Tragia volubilis L.

= Tragia volubilis =

Species of flowering plant

Tragia volubilis also known as fireman is a climbing subshrub or climbing shrub native to tropical America and Africa. It belongs to the Euphorbiaceae family, Tragia genus. As many of the species of the genus, it has stinging hairs, similar to those of nettles.

== Distribution ==
The species is distributed from Mexico and the Caribbean to Argentina, and in Central Africa.

== Uses ==
It is used as a medicinal plant with diuretic and anti STD uses.

== Phytochemistry ==
The methanolic extract of the aerial parts of the plant contains alkaloids, flavonoids and tannins. Avicularin, quercitrin, afzelin and amentoflavone were isolated and identified from the extract. The biological activity of these compounds supports the ethnomedical uses of the plant.

Partitions of the aqueous extract of T. volubilis reduce the activity of the chemotherapeutic doxorubicin.
