= Haematostemon =

Scientific classification
- Kingdom: Plantae
- Clade: Embryophytes
- Clade: Tracheophytes
- Clade: Spermatophytes
- Clade: Angiosperms
- Clade: Eudicots
- Clade: Rosids
- Order: Malpighiales
- Family: Euphorbiaceae
- Subfamily: Acalyphoideae
- Tribe: Plukenetieae
- Subtribe: Plukenetiinae
- Genus: Haematostemon; Pax & K.Hoffm.

Type species
- Haematostemon coriaceus (Baill.) Pax & K. Hoffm.

Genus of flowering plants

Haematostemon is a genus of plant of the family Euphorbiaceae first described as a genus in 1919. It is native to northeastern South America (Guyana and southern Venezuela).

Species

1. Haematostemon coriaceus (Baill.) Pax & K.Hoffm. - Amazonas State in S Venezuela
2. Haematostemon guianensis Sandwith - Potaro-Siparuni region of Guyana
