= Zuckertia =

Scientific classification
- Kingdom: Plantae
- Clade: Tracheophytes
- Clade: Angiosperms
- Clade: Eudicots
- Clade: Rosids
- Order: Malpighiales
- Family: Euphorbiaceae
- Subfamily: Acalyphoideae
- Tribe: Plukenetieae
- Subtribe: Tragiinae
- Genus: Zuckertia; Baill.

Genus of flowering plants

Zuckertia is a genus of plant of the family Euphorbiaceae first described as a genus by Henri Ernest Baillon in 1858.

== Species ==
As of March 2024, Plants of the World Online accepted two species:

- Zuckertia cordata Baill.
- Zuckertia manuelii (V.W.Steinm. & Ram.-Amezcua) Card.-McTeag. & L.J.Gillespie
