= Romanoa terricola =

Scientific classification
- Kingdom: Fungi
- Division: Ascomycota
- Class: Sordariomycetes
- Order: Hypocreales
- Family: Clavicipitaceae
- Genus: Romanoa; Thirum.
- Species: R. terricola

Binomial name
- Romanoa terricola Thirum.

Species of fungus

Romanoa is a genus of fungi within the Clavicipitaceae family.</ref> This is a monotypic genus, containing the single species Romanoa terricola. The genus name Romanoa is also used for a plant.
