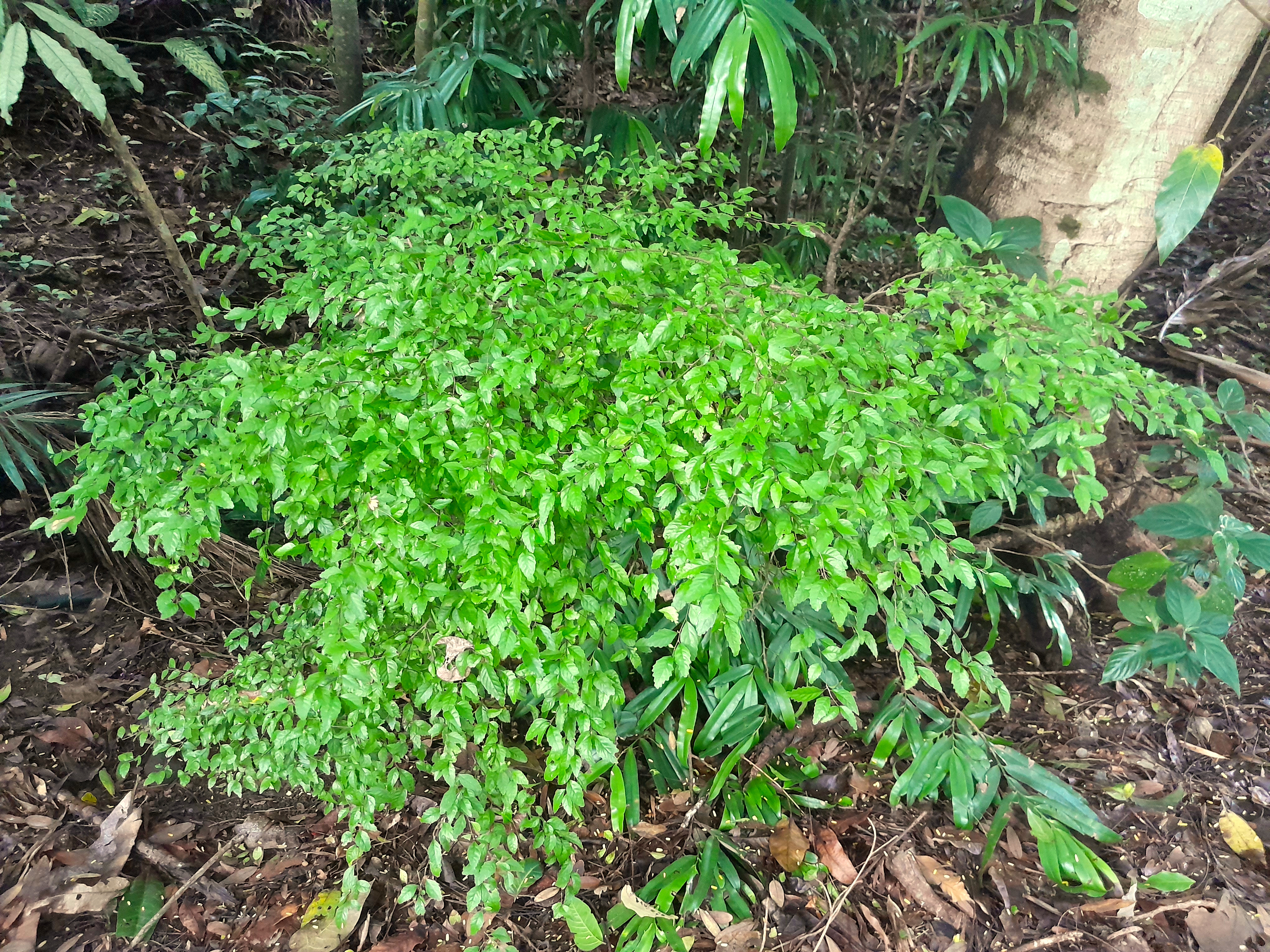
- Small shrub in natural forest in Cairns, Queensland

Conservation status
- Vulnerable (NCA)

Scientific classification
- Kingdom: Plantae
- Clade: Tracheophytes
- Clade: Angiosperms
- Clade: Eudicots
- Clade: Rosids
- Order: Malpighiales
- Family: Euphorbiaceae
- Genus: Acalypha
- Species: A. lyonsii

Binomial name
- Acalypha lyonsii P.I.Forst.

= Acalypha lyonsii =

Lyons' acalphya

Species of flowering plant

Acalypha lyonsii, commonly known as Lyons' acalypha, is a rare species of plants in the spurge family Euphorbiaceae found only in the vicinity of Cairns, Queensland, Australia.

== Description ==
Acalypha lyonsii is a shrub up to 4 m (13 ft) tall. The leaves are arranged alternately on the twigs and measure up to 45 mm (1.8 in) long by 25 mm (0.98 in) wide. They have rounded teeth on the margins and 4 or 5 lateral veins on either side of the midrib. Flowers are produced from the leaf axils—male flowers are less than 1 mm (0.04 in) long and are carried on a spike, female flowers are solitary, about 3 mm (0.12 in) in diameter and subtended by a persistent bract about 7 mm (0.28 in) wide. The fruit is a 3-lobed capsule about 2 mm (0.08 in) long and 4 mm (0.16 in) wide.

== Taxonomy ==
This species was described in 1994 by the Queensland botanist Paul Irwin Forster based on material collected by Christopher Lyons in 1992 on the Lamb Range southwest of Cairns. The species is named after the collector.

== Distribution and habitat ==
Acalypha lyonsii grows as an understorey plant in rainforests near Cairns, at altitudes from sea level to about 200 m (660 ft).

== Conservation ==
This species is listed by the Queensland Government's Department of Environment, Science and Innovation as vulnerable. As of 20 March 2024, it has not been assessed by the International Union for Conservation of Nature (IUCN).

== Gallery ==
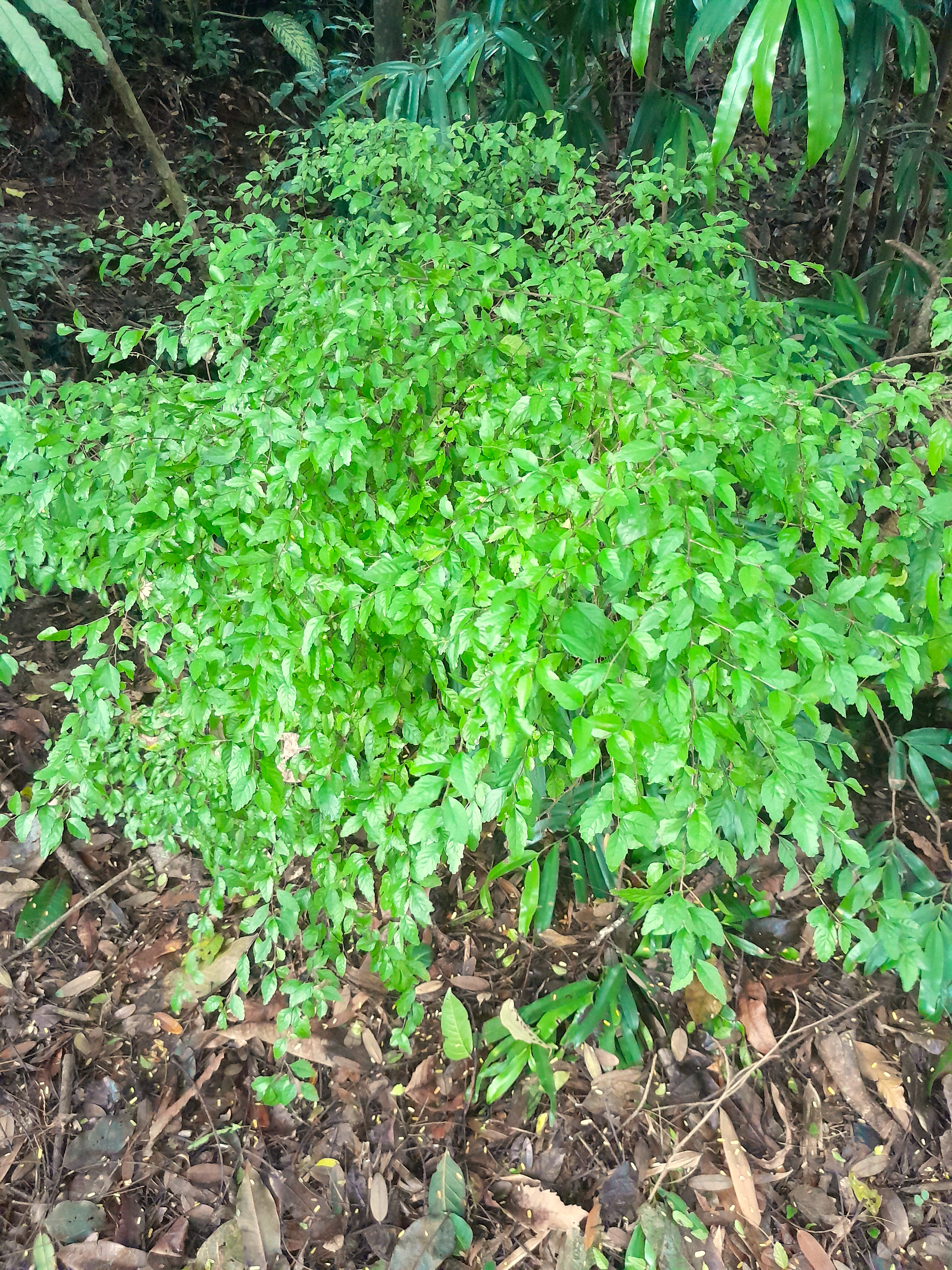
Habit

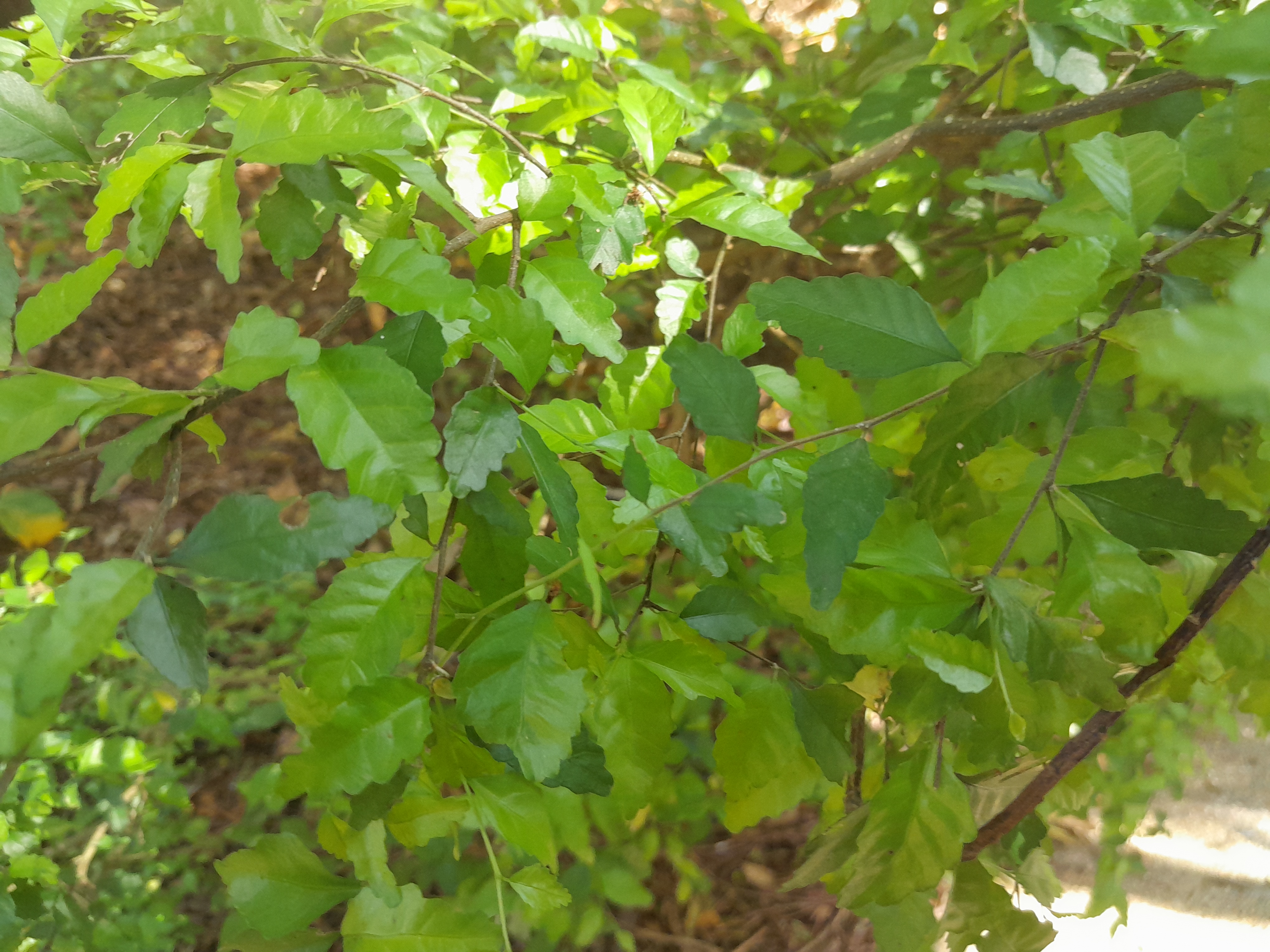
Foliage

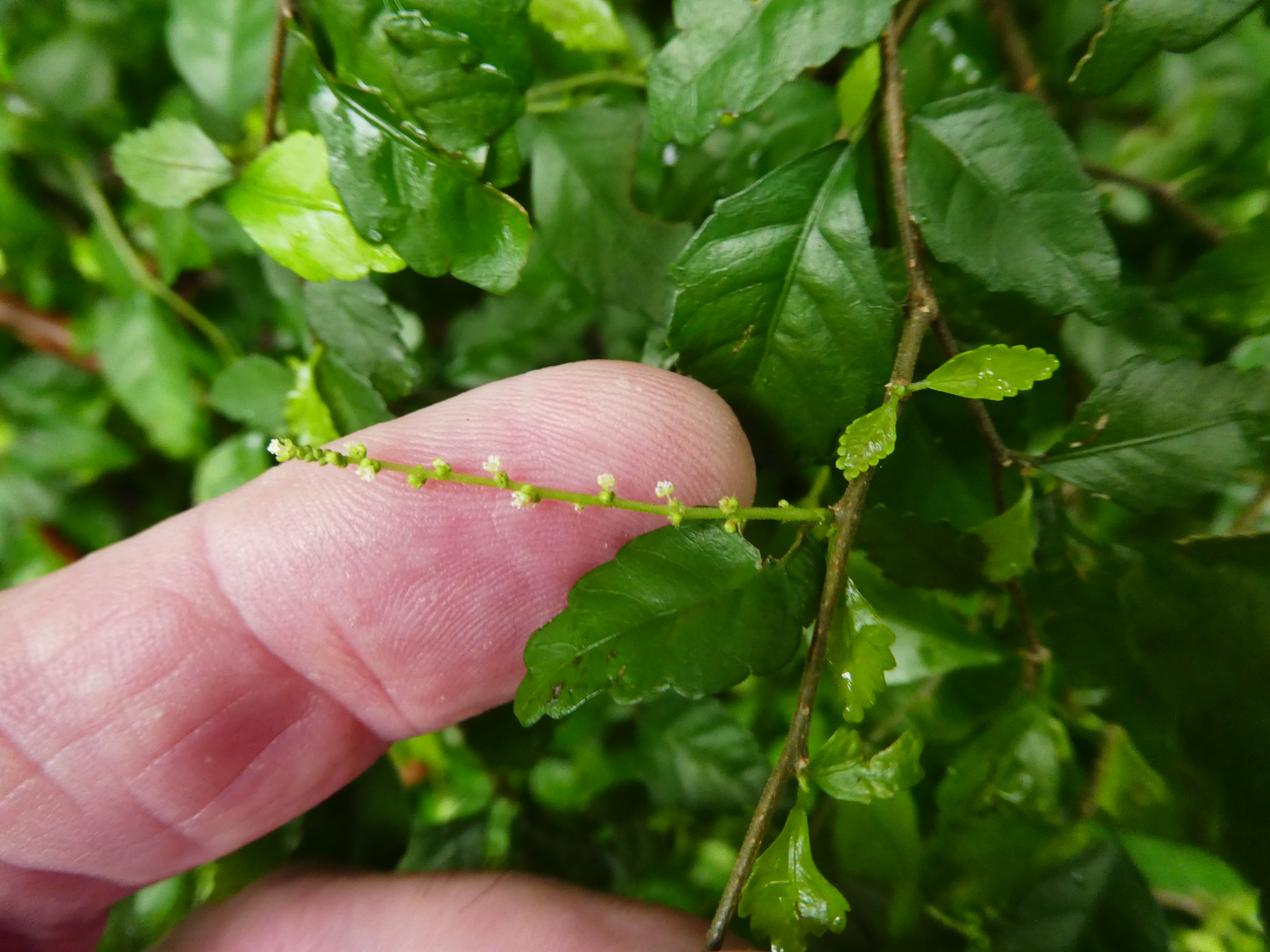
Male flowers

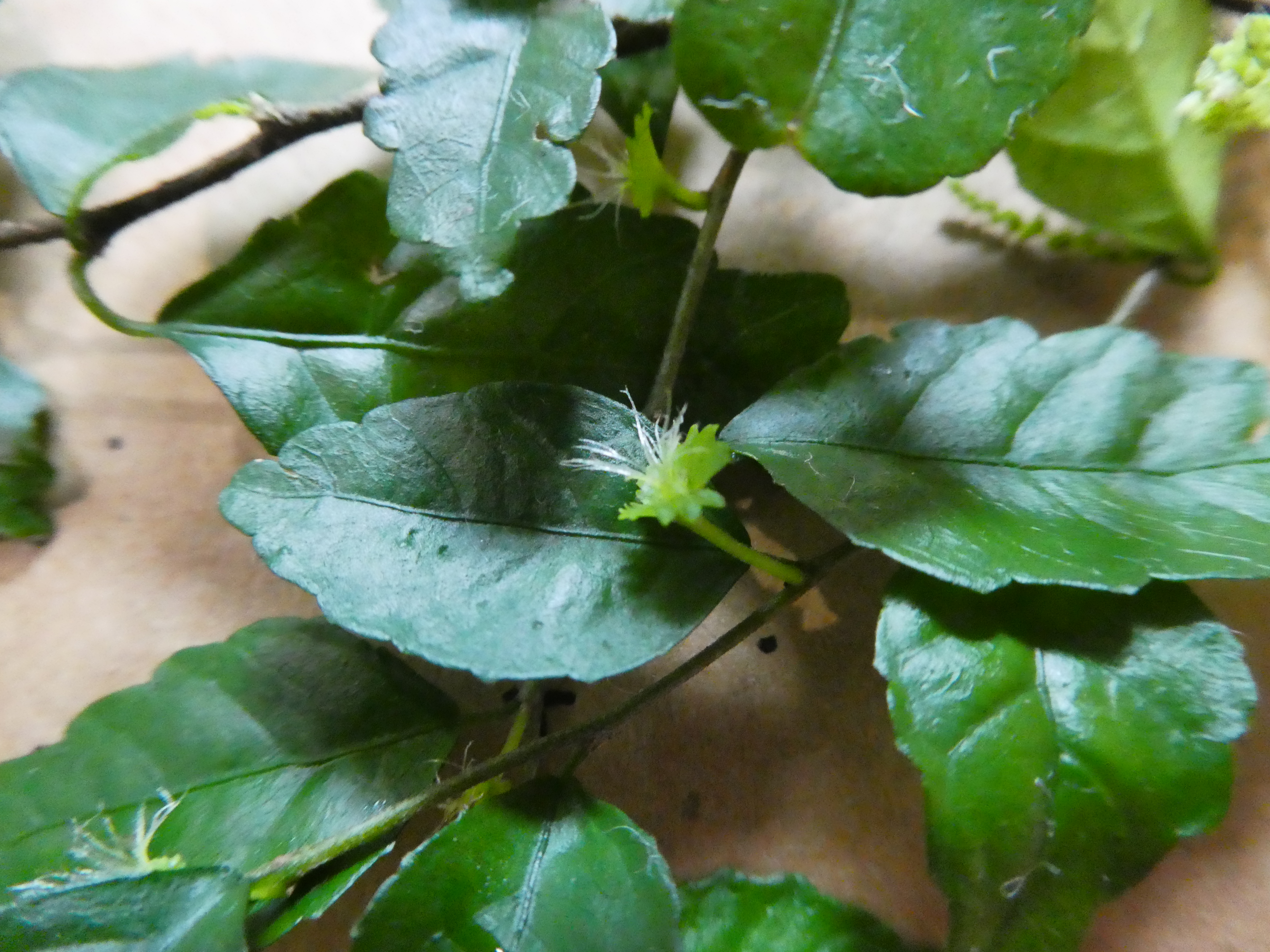
Female flower

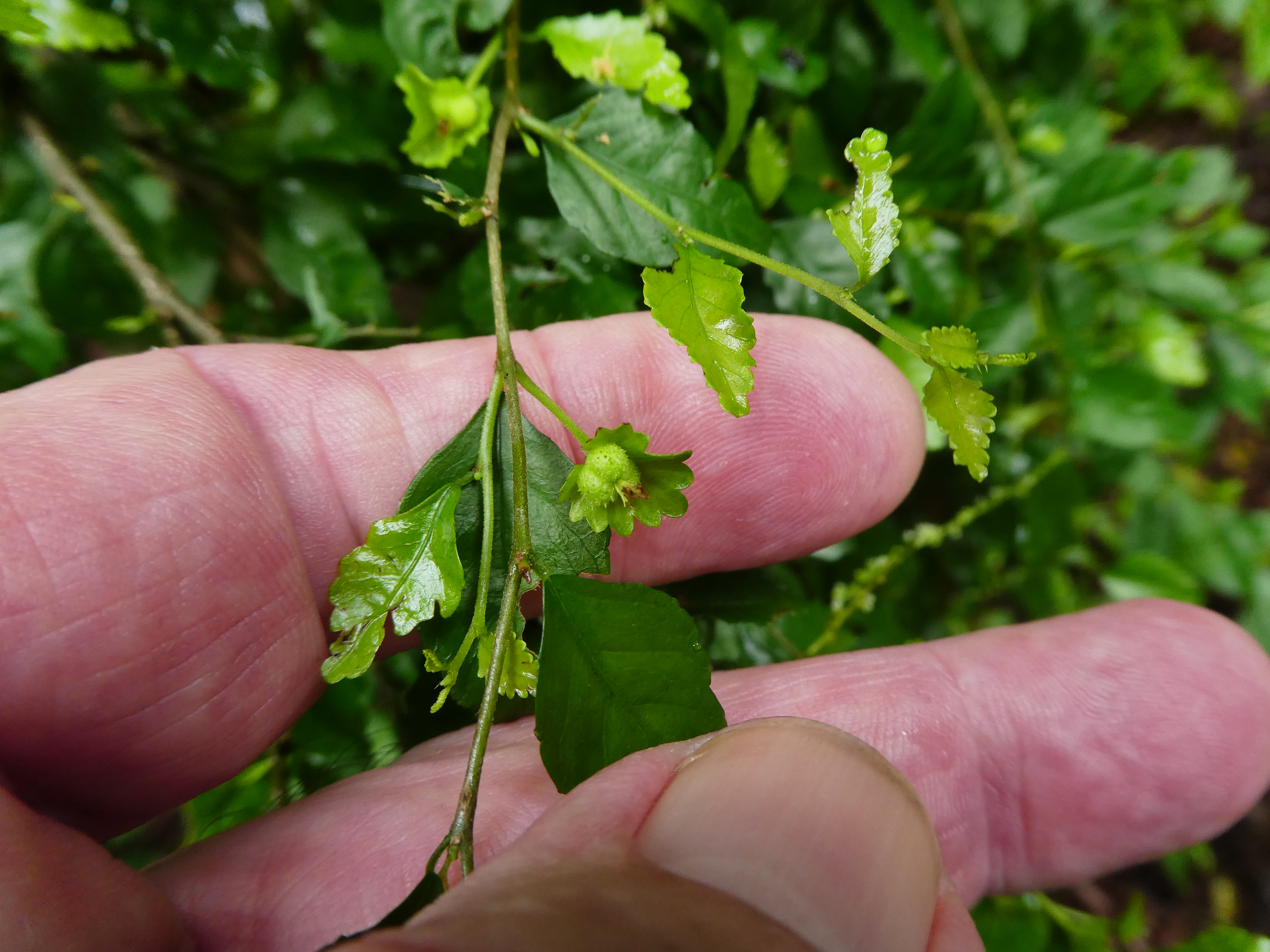
Fruit
