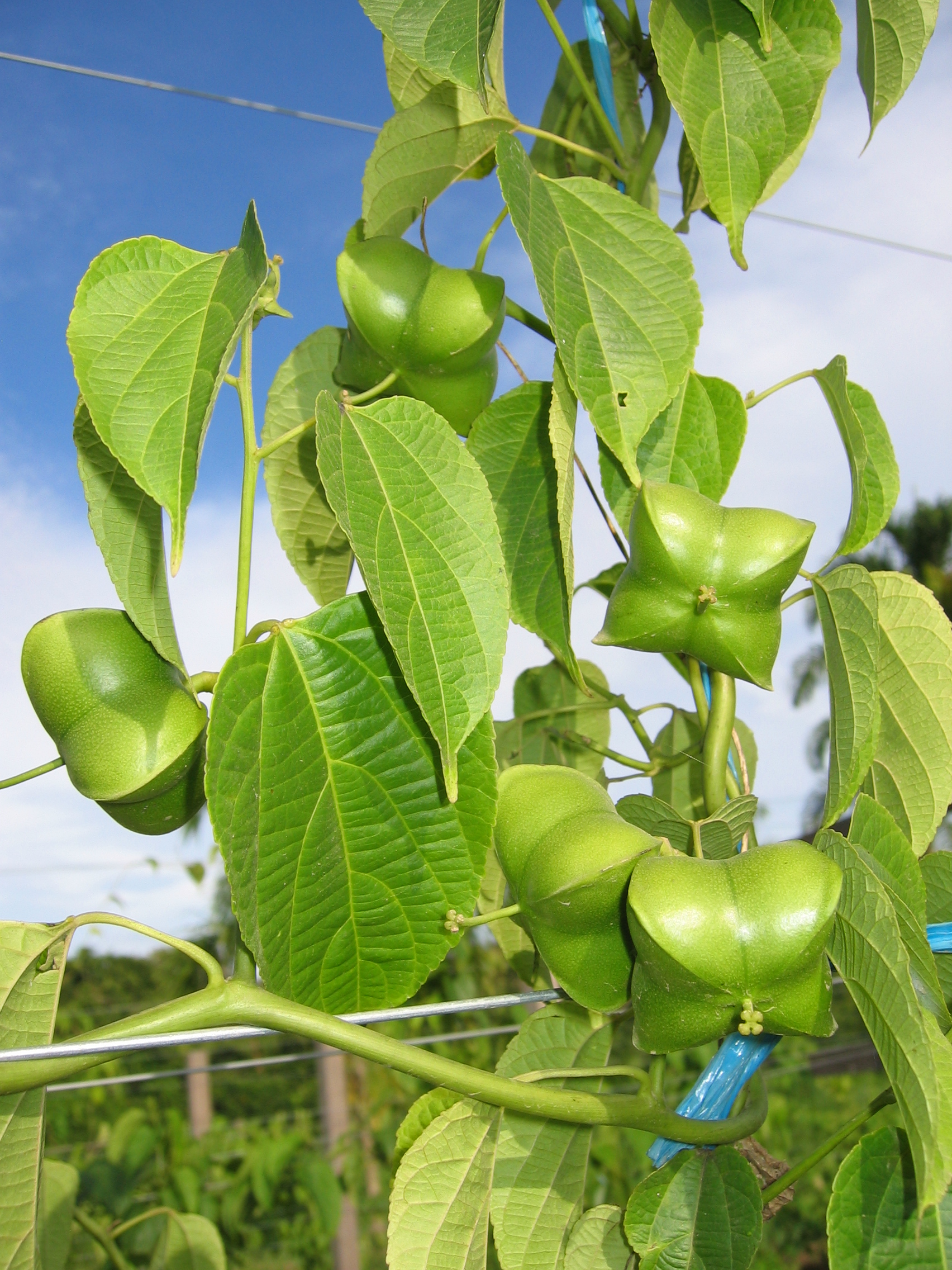
- Plukenetia volubilis

Scientific classification
- Kingdom: Plantae
- Clade: Tracheophytes
- Clade: Angiosperms
- Clade: Eudicots
- Clade: Rosids
- Order: Malpighiales
- Family: Euphorbiaceae
- Subfamily: Acalyphoideae
- Tribe: Plukenetieae
- Subtribe: Plukenetiinae
- Genus: Plukenetia; L.

Synonyms
- Accia A.St.-Hil.; Angostylidium (Müll.Arg.) Pax & K.Hoffm.; Apopandra Pax & K.Hoffm.; Botryanthe Klotzsch; Ceratococcus Meisn.; Elaeophora Ducke; Eleutherostigma Pax & K.Hoffm.; Fragariopsis A.St.-Hil.; Hedraiostylus Hassk.; Pseudotragia Pax; Pterococcus Hassk.; Sajorium Endl.; Tetracarpidium Pax; Vigia Vell.

= Plukenetia =

Genus of plants

Plukenetia is a genus of plant of the family Euphorbiaceae. It is widespread in tropical regions of Africa, the Indian subcontinent, Southeast Asia, and the Americas.

Species

1. Plukenetia africana - southern Africa
2. Plukenetia ankaranensis - Madagascar
3. Plukenetia brachybotrya - W + C South America
4. Plukenetia carabiasiae - Oaxaca
5. Plukenetia conophora - W + C Africa
6. Plukenetia corniculata - S + SE Asia
7. Plukenetia decidua - Madagascar
8. Plukenetia huayllabambana - Peru
9. Plukenetia lehmanniana - Colombia, Ecuador
10. Plukenetia loretensis - tropical South America
11. Plukenetia madagascariensis - Madagascar
12. Plukenetia multiglandulosa - Amazonas State
13. Plukenetia penninervia - S Mexico, Central America, NW South America
14. Plukenetia polyadenia - N South America
15. Plukenetia procumbens - Angola
16. Plukenetia serrata - E Brazil
17. Plukenetia stipellata - S Mexico, Central America
18. Plukenetia supraglandulosa - French Guiana, Amapá
19. Plukenetia verrucosa - Trinidad, 3 Guianas, N Brazil
20. Plukenetia volubilis - N + W South America; Windward Islands

formerly included

moved to other genera (Hamilcoa, Romanoa)

1. Plukenetia occidentalis - Romanoa tamnoides
2. Plukenetia sinuata - Romanoa tamnoides var. sinuata
3. Plukenetia tamnoides - Romanoa tamnoides
4. Plukenetia zenkeri - Hamilcoa zenkeri
