= Pachystylidium =

Scientific classification
- Kingdom: Plantae
- Clade: Tracheophytes
- Clade: Angiosperms
- Clade: Eudicots
- Clade: Rosids
- Order: Malpighiales
- Family: Euphorbiaceae
- Subfamily: Acalyphoideae
- Tribe: Plukenetieae
- Subtribe: Tragiinae
- Genus: Pachystylidium; Pax & K.Hoffm.
- Species: P. hirsutum

Binomial name
- Pachystylidium hirsutum Pax & K.Hoffm.

Synonyms
- Tragia hirsuta Blume; Tragia irritans Merr.; Tragia gagei Haines; Pachystylidium hirsutum var. irritans Pax & K.Hoffm.; Tragia delpyana Gagnep.

Genus of flowering plants

Pachystylidium is a genus of plant of the family Euphorbiaceae. It contains only one known species, Pachystylidium hirsutum, found in eastern India, Indochina, the Philippines, Sulawesi, the Lesser Sunda Islands, and Java.
