= Acalypha pittieri =

Scientific classification
- Kingdom: Plantae
- Clade: Tracheophytes
- Clade: Angiosperms
- Clade: Eudicots
- Clade: Rosids
- Order: Malpighiales
- Family: Euphorbiaceae
- Genus: Acalypha
- Species: A. pittieri

Binomial name
- Acalypha pittieri Pax & K.Hoffm.

Species of flowering plant

Acalypha pittieri is a species of flowering plant in the family Euphorbiaceae. It is native to the Central American Pacific Islands, found in the north of Cocos Island.
