= Romanoa tamnoides =

Scientific classification
- Kingdom: Plantae
- Clade: Tracheophytes
- Clade: Angiosperms
- Clade: Eudicots
- Clade: Rosids
- Order: Malpighiales
- Family: Euphorbiaceae
- Subfamily: Acalyphoideae
- Tribe: Plukenetieae
- Subtribe: Plukenetiinae
- Genus: Romanoa; Trevis.
- Species: R. tamnoides

Binomial name
- Romanoa tamnoides (A. Juss.) Radcl.-Sm.

Synonyms
- Anabaena A.Juss. 1824, rejected name, not Bory ex Bornet & Flahault 1888 (cyanobacterium); Anabaena tamnoides A. Juss.; Anabaenella Pax & K.Hoffm. 1919; Anabaenella tamnoides (A. Juss.) Pax & K. Hoffm.; Sajorium tamnoides (A.Juss.) Baill.; Plukenetia tamnoides (A.Juss.) Müll.Arg.; Plukenetia sinuata Ule; Anabaenella tamnoides var. sinuata (Ule) Pax & K.Hoffm; Croton scandens Vell.; Plukenetia occidentalis Leandro ex Baill.

Species of flowering plant

Romanoa tamnoides is a species of plant of the family Euphorbiaceae. It is the sole species in the monotypic genus Romanoa, first described in 1824. It is native to Brazil and Paraguay.

Varieties

- Romanoa tamnoides var. sinuata (Ule) Radcl.-Sm. - Bahia
- Romanoa tamnoides var. tamnoides - Paraguay, SE Brazil (Minas Gerais, Goiás, Rio de Janeiro)

The genus name Romanoa is also used for a fungus.
