= Zuckertia cordata =

Scientific classification
- Kingdom: Plantae
- Clade: Tracheophytes
- Clade: Angiosperms
- Clade: Eudicots
- Clade: Rosids
- Order: Malpighiales
- Family: Euphorbiaceae
- Genus: Zuckertia
- Species: Z. cordata

Binomial name
- Zuckertia cordata Baill.

Synonyms
- Bia cordata (Baill.) G.L.Webster; Tragia bailloniana Müll.Arg.

Species of flowering plant

Zuckertia cordata is a species of flowering plant in the family Euphorbiaceae, native from southern Mexico to Central America. It was first described by Henri Ernest Baillon in 1858.
