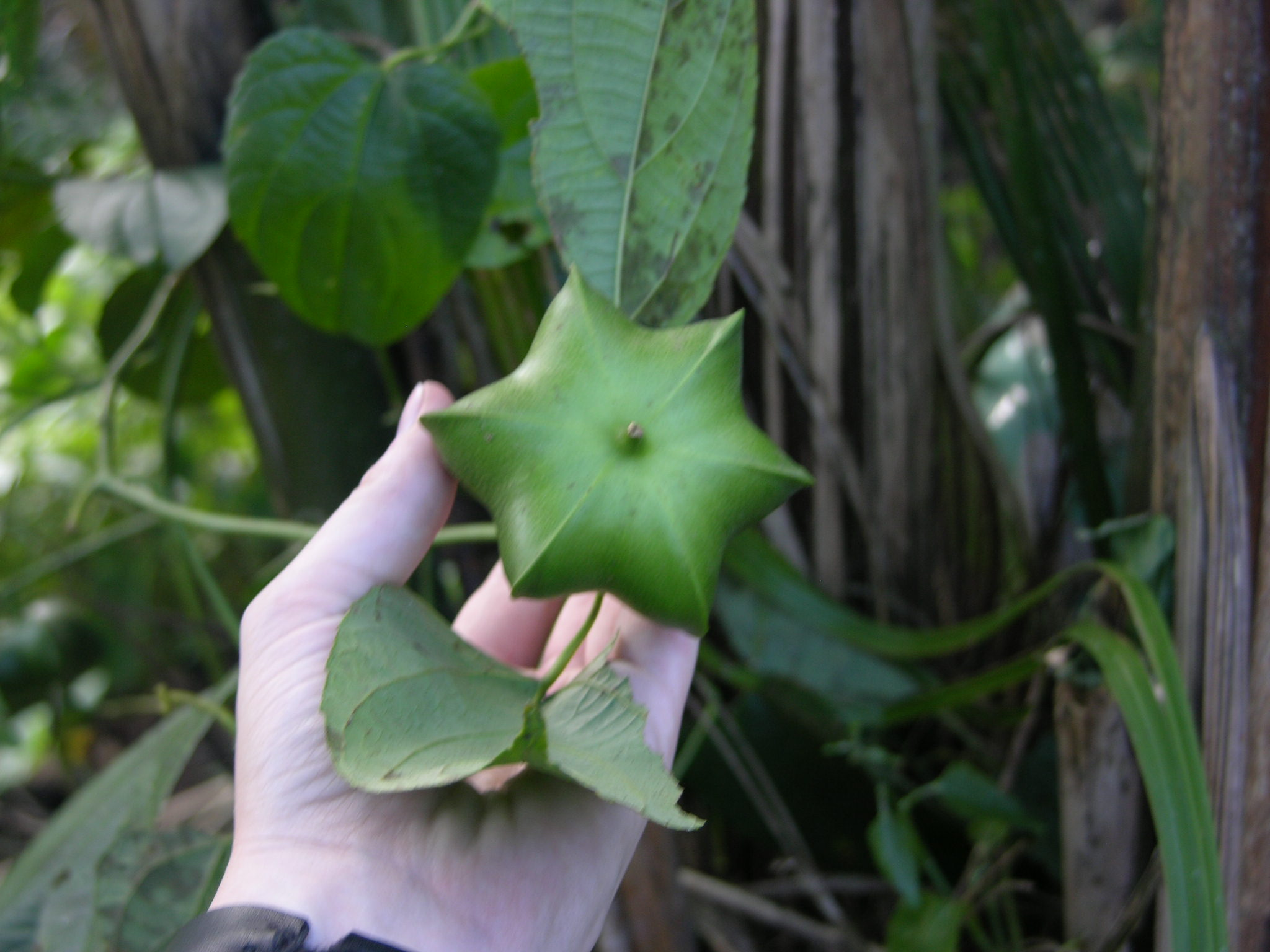
- Plukenetia volubilis

Scientific classification
- Kingdom: Plantae
- Clade: Tracheophytes
- Clade: Angiosperms
- Clade: Eudicots
- Clade: Rosids
- Order: Malpighiales
- Family: Euphorbiaceae
- Subfamily: Acalyphoideae
- Tribe: Plukenetieae; Hutch.

Subtribes and genera
- Subtribe Dalechampiinae Dalechampia Subtribe Plukenetiinae Angostylis Astrococcus Haematostemon Plukenetia Romanoa Subtribe Tragiinae Acidoton Bia Cnesmone Megistostigma Pachystylidium Platygyna Sphaerostylis Tragia Tragiella

= Plukenetieae =

Tribe of flowering plants

Plukenetieae is a tribe of plant of the family Euphorbiaceae. It comprises 3 subtribes and 14 genera. Tribe Plukenetieae (Benth.) Hutch. (Euphorbiaceae, Acalyphoideae) is a diverse pantropical lineage of ca. 17 genera and 350 species of twining vines and lianas, scandent to erect perennial herbs and subshrubs, and rarely shrubs and small trees.

== See also ==
- Taxonomy of the Euphorbiaceae
