= Acalypha integrifolia =

Scientific classification
- Kingdom: Plantae
- Clade: Tracheophytes
- Clade: Angiosperms
- Clade: Eudicots
- Clade: Rosids
- Order: Malpighiales
- Family: Euphorbiaceae
- Subtribe: Acalyphinae
- Genus: Acalypha
- Species: A. integrifolia

Binomial name
- Acalypha integrifolia Willd.

Species of flowering plant

Acalypha integrifolia is a species of flowering plant in the botanical family Euphorbiaceae. It is locally used as a medicinal plant. Leaf decoctions are drunk to treat intestinal worms.

== Geographic distribution ==
Acalypha integrifolia occurs in Madagascar, Reunion and Mauritius. It is relatively common.

== others ==
This plant is a host plant of the butterfly Neptis dumetorum.
