= Tragiella =

Scientific classification
- Kingdom: Plantae
- Clade: Tracheophytes
- Clade: Angiosperms
- Clade: Eudicots
- Clade: Rosids
- Order: Malpighiales
- Family: Euphorbiaceae
- Subfamily: Acalyphoideae
- Tribe: Plukenetieae
- Subtribe: Tragiinae
- Genus: Tragiella; Pax & K.Hoffm.

Genus of plants

Tragiella is a genus of plant of the family Euphorbiaceae first described as a genus in 1919. It is native to Africa.

Species

1. Tragiella anomala (Prain) Pax & K.Hoffm. - Tanzania, Malawi, Zambia
2. Tragiella frieseana (Prain) Pax & K.Hoffm. - Zambia
3. Tragiella natalensis (Sond.) Pax & K.Hoffm. - South Sudan, Kenya, Tanzania, Uganda, Malawi, Mozambique, Zimbabwe, Cape Province, KwaZulu-Natal, Limpopo, Mpumalanga
4. Tragiella pyxostigma Radcl.-Sm. - Tanzania

formerly included

moved to Dalechampia

- Tragiella pavoniifolia Chiov. - Dalechampia pavoniifolia (Chiov.) M.G.Gilbert - Somalia
