= Megistostigma =

Scientific classification
- Kingdom: Plantae
- Clade: Tracheophytes
- Clade: Angiosperms
- Clade: Eudicots
- Clade: Rosids
- Order: Malpighiales
- Family: Euphorbiaceae
- Subfamily: Acalyphoideae
- Tribe: Plukenetieae
- Subtribe: Tragiinae
- Genus: Megistostigma; Hook.f.

Synonyms
- Clavistylus J.J.Sm. ex Koord. & Valeton

Genus of flowering plants

Megistostigma is a genus of plant of the family Euphorbiaceae first described as a genus in 1887. It is native to southern China, Assam, and Southeast Asia.

Species

1. Megistostigma burmanicum - Assam, Myanmar, Thailand, Perlis
2. Megistostigma cordatum - Sumatra, Sabah, Samar
3. Megistostigma glabratum - Peninsular Malaysia, Anamba Islands, N Sumatra
4. Megistostigma peltatum - Siberut, Natuna, Java
5. Megistostigma yunnanense - Yunnan
