= List of butterflies of Chandigarh =

This is a list of butterfly species found in the union territory of Chandigarh in India.

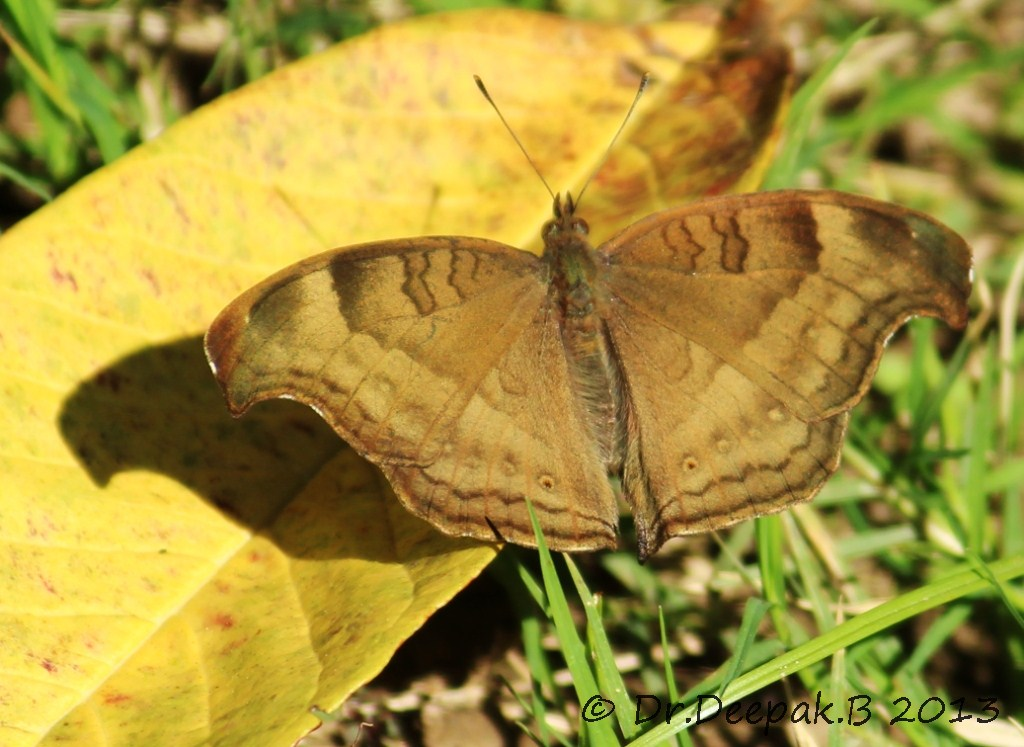
Chocolate pansy, Butterfly Park, Sector 26, Chandigarh

== Milkweed butterflies (Danainae) ==
- Tirumala limniace (blue tiger)
- Danaus genutia (common tiger)
- Danaus chrysippus (plain tiger)
- Euploea core (common Indian crow)
- Melanitis leda (common evening brown)

== Satyrs or browns (Satyrinae) ==
- Mycalesis perseus (common bushbrown)
- Mycalesis mineus (dark-branded bushbrown)
- Ypthima baldus (common fivering)
- Ypthima asterope (common threering)

== Brush-footed butterflies (Nymphalidae) ==
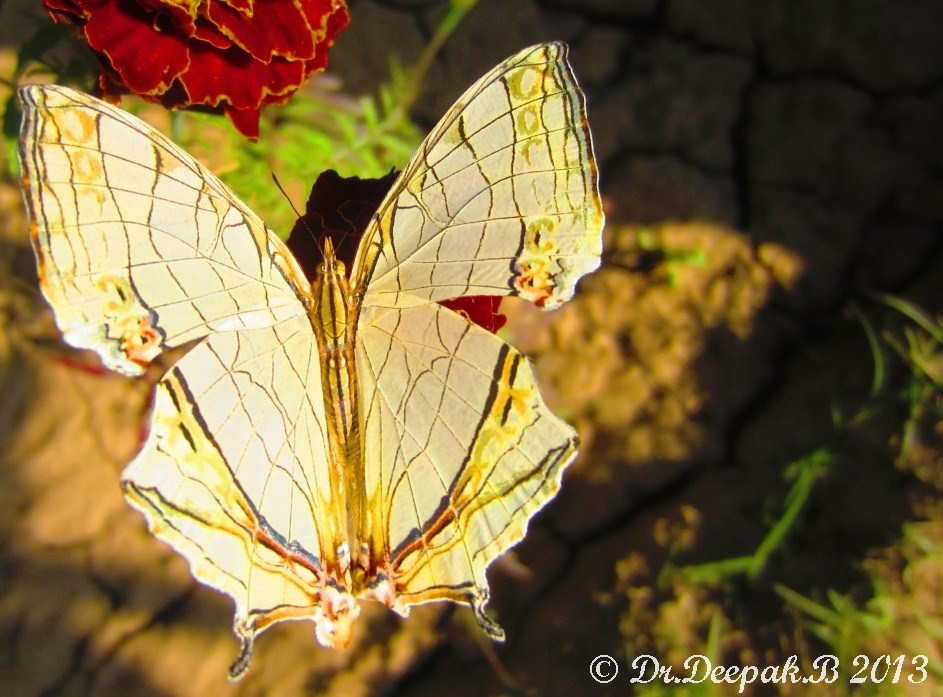
Common map on a marigold bloom, Butterfly Garden, Sector 26, Chandigarh

- Phalanta phalantha (common leopard)
- Ariadne merione (common castor)
- Ariadne ariadne (angled castor)
- Acraea violae (tawny coster)
- Junonia lemonias (lemon pansy)
- Junonia almana (peacock pansy)
- Junonia atlites (grey pansy)
- Junonia iphita (chocolate pansy)
- Vanessa cardui (painted lady)
- Vanessa indica (Indian red admiral)
- Argynnis hyperbius (Indian fritillary)
- Precis hierta (yellow pansy)
- Junonia orithya (blue pansy)
- Neptis hylas (common sailer)
- Cyrestis thyodamas (common map)
- Libythea myrrha (club beak)
- Athyma selenophora (staff sergeant)

== Gossamerwings (Lycaenidae) ==
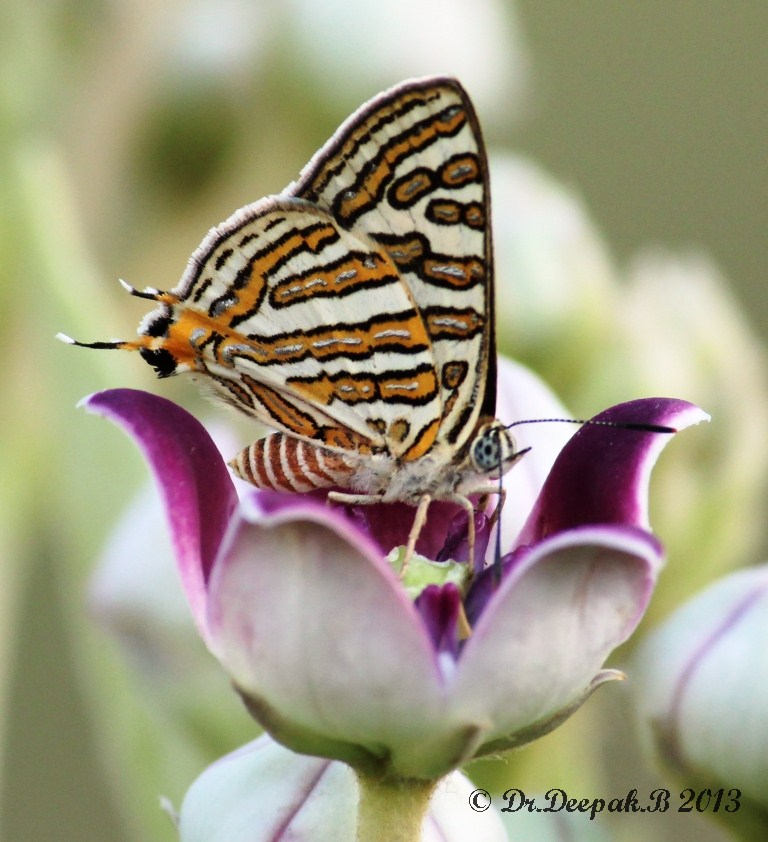
Common silverline, Saketri, Chandigarh

- Talicada nyseus (red Pierrot)
- Castalius rosimon (common Pierrot)
- Azanus ubaldus (bright babul blue)
- Freyeria trochylus (grass jewel)
- Lampides boeticus (pea blue)
- Cigaritis vulcanus (common silverline)
- Virachola isocrates (common guava blue)
- Leptotes plinius (zebra blue)
- Zizeeria maha (pale grass blue)

== Whites and sulphurs (Pieridae) ==
- Delias eucharis (common Jezebel)
- Pontia daplidice (Bath white)
- Belenois aurota (pioneer white)
- Gonepteryx rhamni (common brimstone)
- Eurema blanda (three-spot grass yellow)
- Catopsilia crocale (common emigrant)
- Catopsilia pyranthe (mottled emigrant)
- Ixias marianne (white orange tip)
- Ixias pyrene (yellow orange tip)
- Colias croceus (dark clouded yellow
- Pieris brassicae (Indian large cabbage white)
- Pieris canidia (Indian cabbage white)

== Swallowtails (Papilionidae) ==
- Papilio polytes (common Mormon)
- Papilio demoleus (lime butterfly)
- Graphium doson (common jay)

== Skippers (Hesperiidae) ==
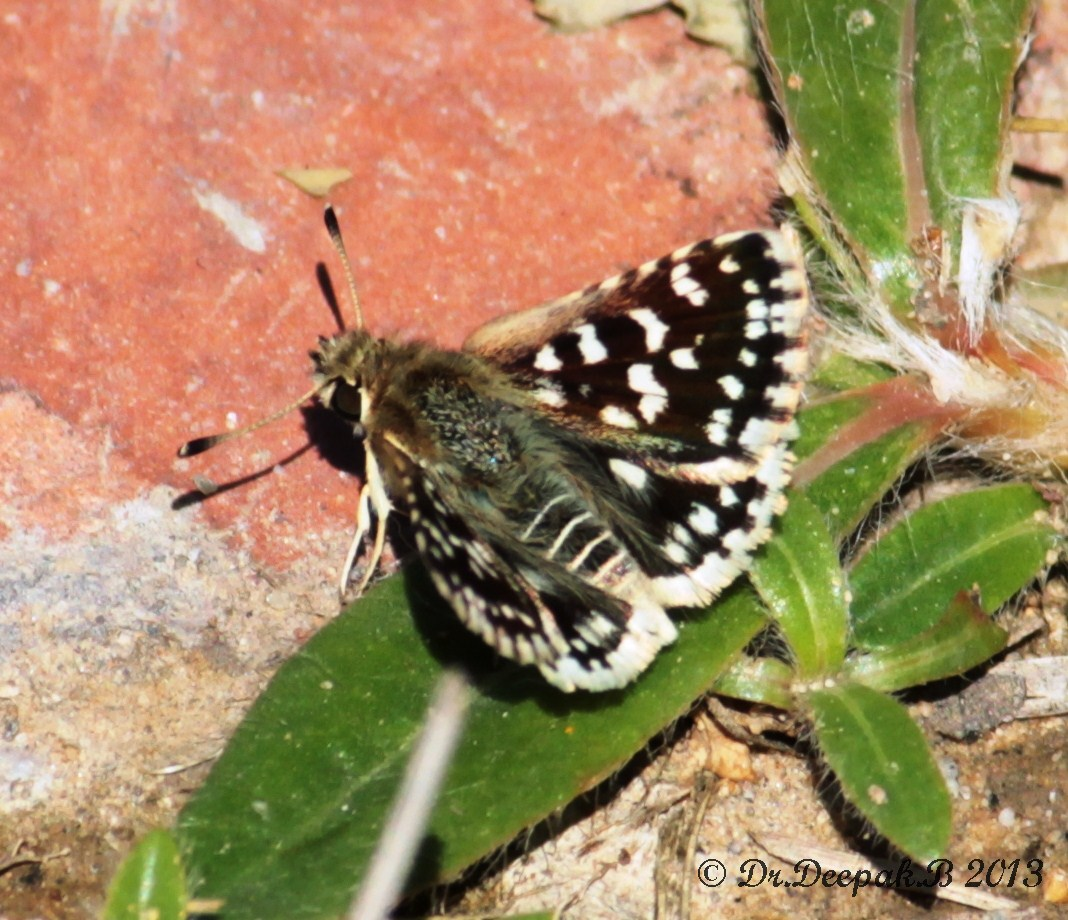
The Indian skipper butterfly spotted in Botanical Garden, Chandigarh

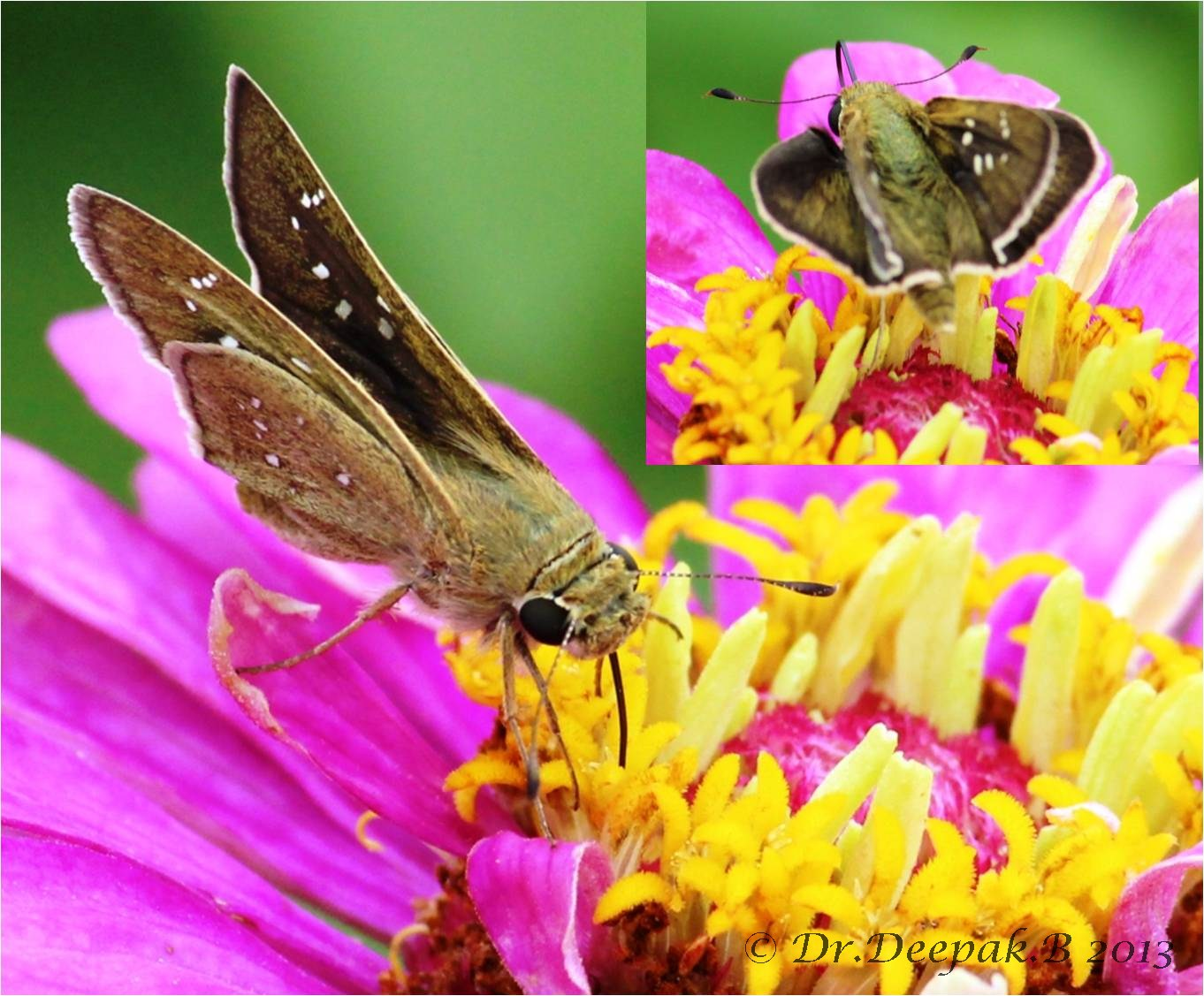
Small branded swift taken at Chandigarh

- Spialia galba (Indian skipper)
- Baoris guttatus bada (straight swift)
- Pelopidas mathias (small branded swift )
