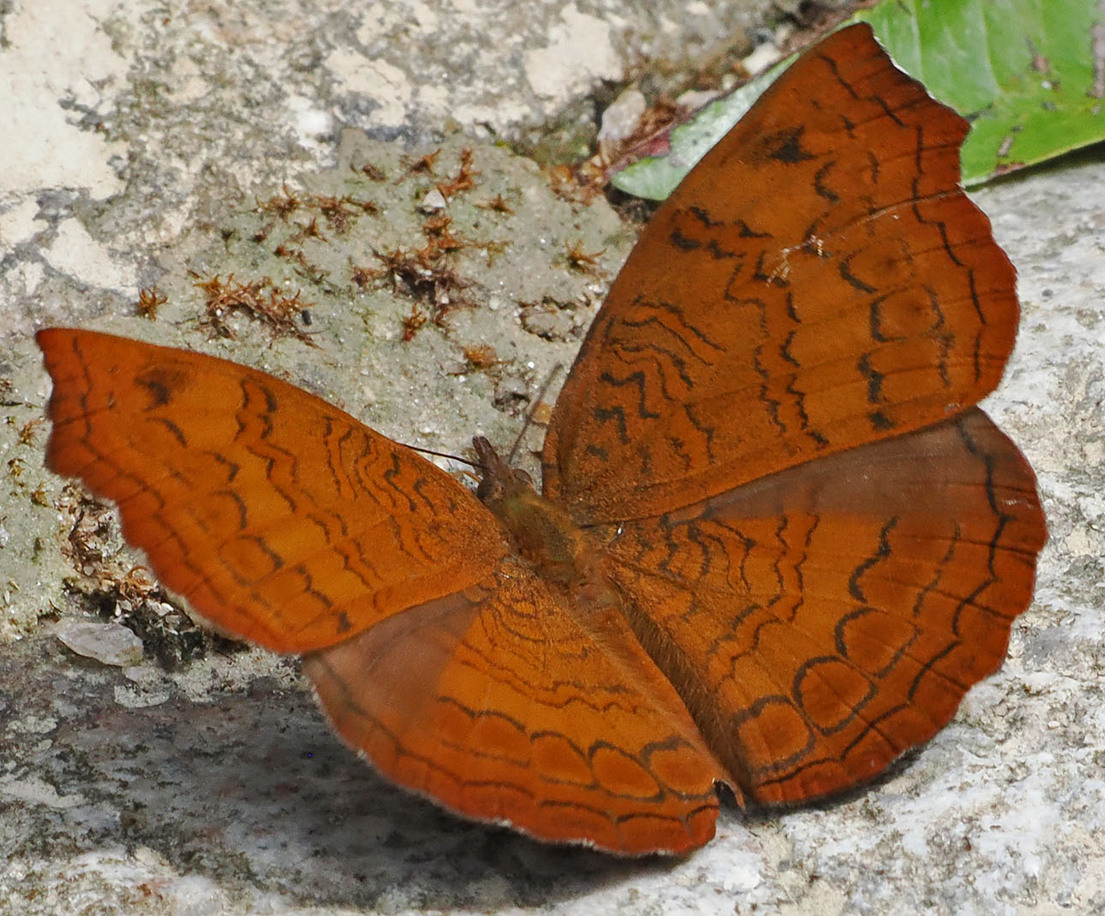

Scientific classification
- Kingdom: Animalia
- Phylum: Arthropoda
- Clade: Pancrustacea
- Class: Insecta
- Order: Lepidoptera
- Family: Nymphalidae
- Genus: Ariadne
- Species: A. isaeus

Binomial name
- Ariadne isaeus (Wallace, 1869)

Synonyms
- Ergolis isaeus Wallace, 1869

= Ariadne isaeus =

Malayan castor

Species of butterfly

Ariadne isaeus, the Malayan castor, is a species of butterfly found primarily in Malaysia and western Indonesia, as well as Thailand.

== Description ==
The Malayan castor looks similar to the Angled castor, but with more upwardly-angled lobes on the top wings as well as a darker color and a lack of white spots near the apex of the wings. Crescent-shaped ring markings border the hind wings, each enclosing a darker red-brown spot. The undersides of the wings are a dusky-brown, with a darker strip running parallel to the outer edge of the wings. The hind wings are paler than the top wings, but otherwise similar, and mirror the markings on the top.

Females and males are similar, though females tend to be paler, especially on the underside. Both sexes have a wingspan of around 5.2–5.6 cm (2.0–2.2 in).
