= Ixia (disambiguation) =

Ixia may refer to:

- Ixia, a genus of cormous plants native to South Africa
- Ialysos, a resort town on the island of Rhodes
- Ixia (company), an IP networking and communications company

== See also ==
- Ixias, a genus of butterfly
