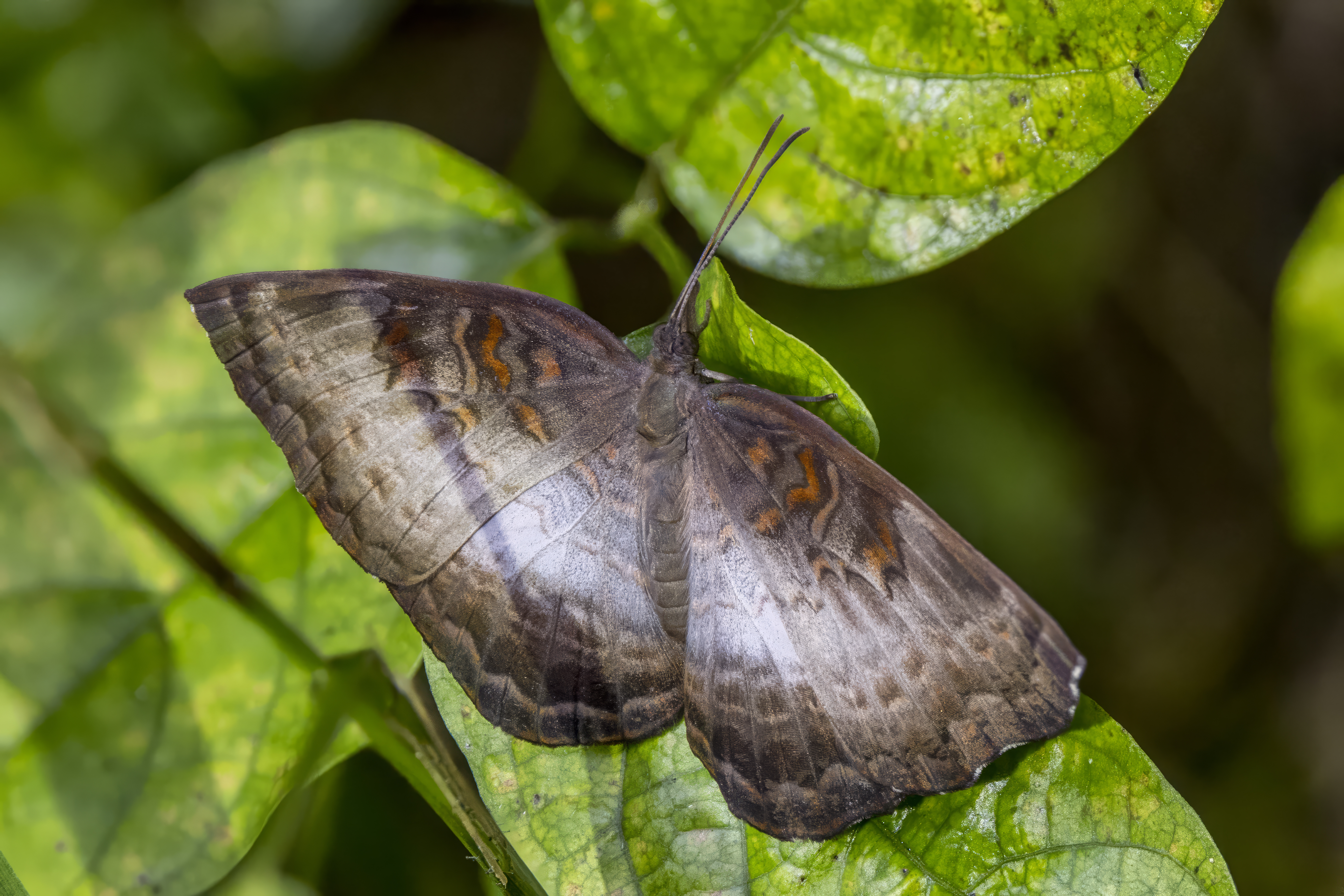
- in Ghana

Scientific classification
- Kingdom: Animalia
- Phylum: Arthropoda
- Clade: Pancrustacea
- Class: Insecta
- Order: Lepidoptera
- Family: Nymphalidae
- Genus: Ariadne
- Species: A. albifascia

Binomial name
- Ariadne albifascia (Joicey & Talbot, 1921)

Synonyms
- Ergolis albifascia Joicey & Talbot, 1921

= Ariadne albifascia =

Species of butterfly

Ariadne albifascia, the white-banded castor, is a butterfly in the family Nymphalidae.The Biblidinae are a subfamily of butterflies with over 350 species worldwide, the vast majority of which are Neotropical. In the Afrotropical region there 30 species, in the genera Byblia, Ariadne, Eurytela, Neptidopsis, Sevenia and Mesoxantha. It is found in Sierra Leone, Liberia, Ivory Coast, Ghana, Nigeria (the southern part of the country and the Cross River loop), Cameroon, the Republic of the Congo, the Central African Republic and western Uganda. The habitat consists of forests, especially open degraded habitats.

The larvae feed on the Tragia species T. benthami, T. volubilis, T. brevipes and Dalechampia ipomaefolia.
