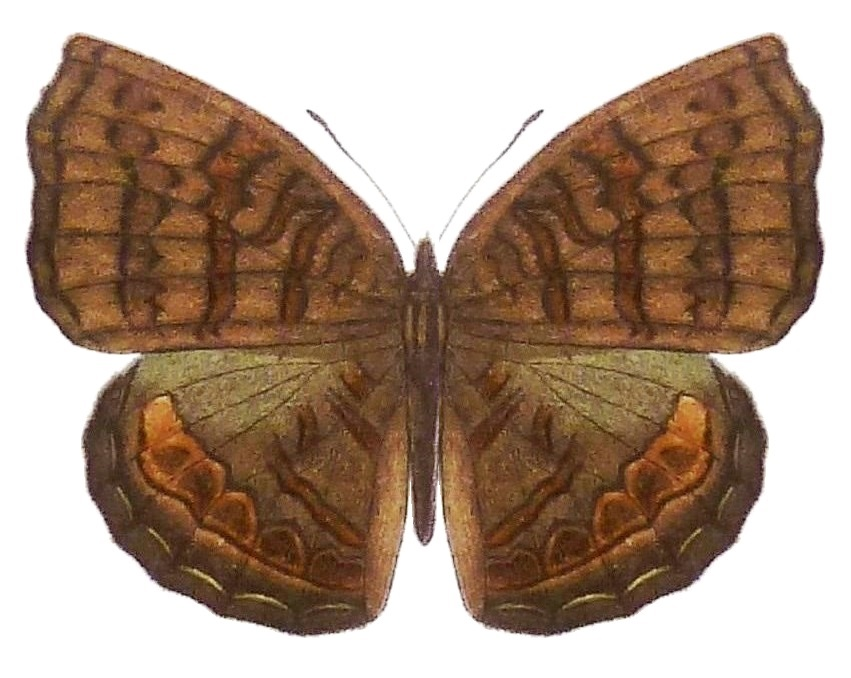
- In Adalbert Seitz's Fauna Africana

Scientific classification
- Kingdom: Animalia
- Phylum: Arthropoda
- Clade: Pancrustacea
- Class: Insecta
- Order: Lepidoptera
- Family: Nymphalidae
- Genus: Ariadne
- Species: A. actisanes

Binomial name
- Ariadne actisanes (Hewitson, 1875)

Synonyms
- Ergolis actisanes Hewitson, 1875

= Ariadne actisanes =

Large castor

Species of butterfly

Ariadne actisanes, the large castor, is a butterfly in the family Nymphalidae. It is found in Nigeria, Cameroon, Gabon, the Republic of the Congo and the Democratic Republic of the Congo. The habitat consists of disturbed areas in forests.
