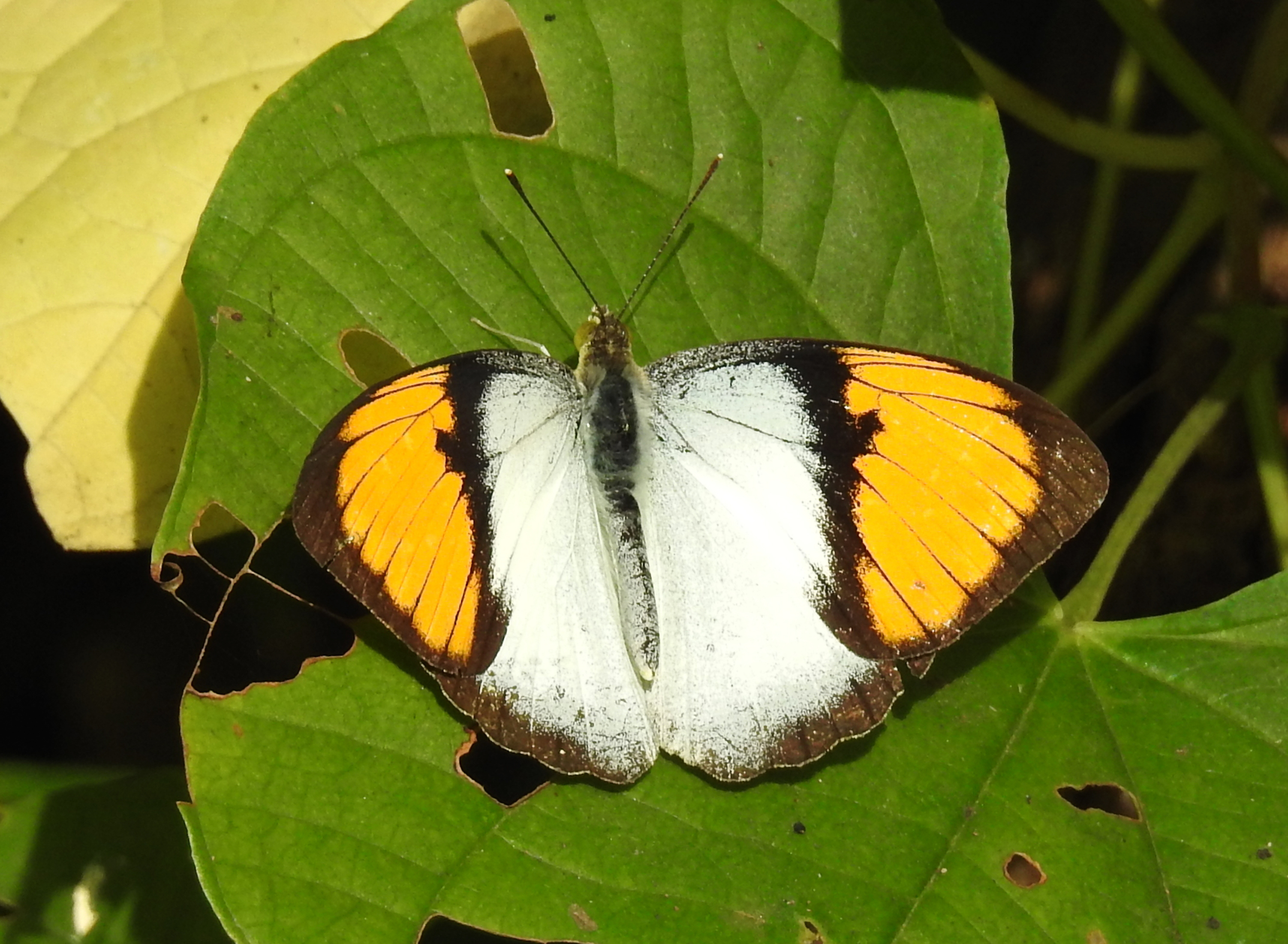
- Male
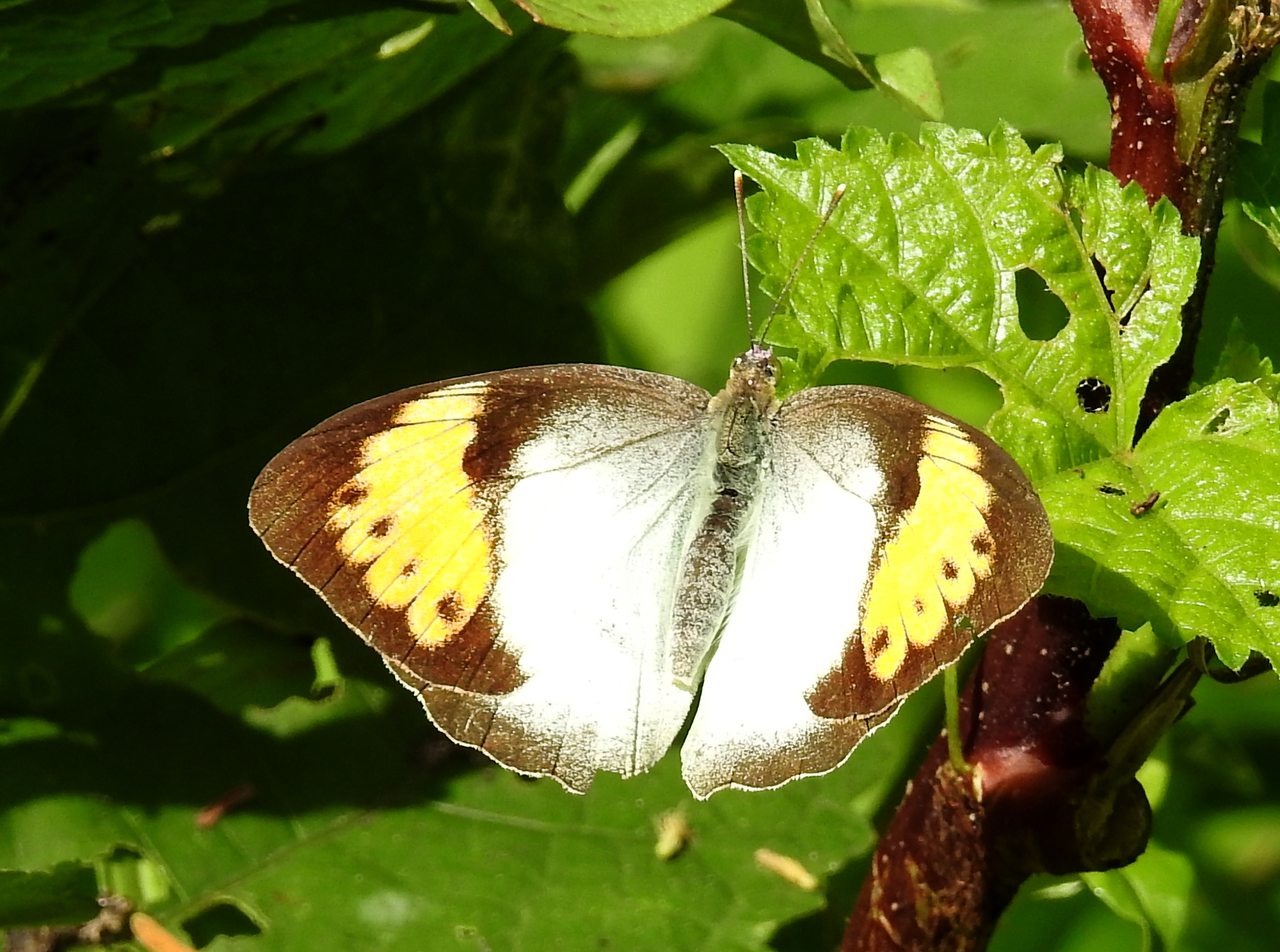
- Female

Scientific classification
- Domain: Eukaryota
- Kingdom: Animalia
- Phylum: Arthropoda
- Class: Insecta
- Order: Lepidoptera
- Family: Pieridae
- Genus: Ixias
- Species: I. marianne

Binomial name
- Ixias marianne (Cramer, 1779)

= Ixias marianne =

White orange tip

Species of butterfly

Ixias marianne, the white orange tip, is a small butterfly of the family Pieridae, (the yellows and whites) found in India and Sri Lanka.

== Description ==
The characteristics of this species vary according to the season in which the eggs are laid.

=== Wet-season brood ===
The male has chalky-white wings with the apical half of the forewing and terminal margin of the hindwing broadly black. There is a broad, rich, orange patch obliquely across the black area extended to the upper apex of the forewing. At the lower apex this orange patch is very broad and leaves only the tip of the wing black along with a comparatively narrow band along the edge. The base of the wing is covered with black scales.

The underside of the wing is a rich sulphur-yellow as in other species of the genus, and is covered with reddish brown, short, transverse striations and minute dots. The forewing has an orange patch on the upperside which can be plainly seen because of the transparency on the wing, a broadly triangular area below this cell white, large and prominent discocellular spots with a white centre. Both forewings and hindwings have a discal transverse series of reddish-brown spots, more or less conspicuous, the spots always centred with white. In other species in the genus these is characteristic of the dry-season broods. On the forewing the patch above the tornus is prominent and in some specimens very large. The antennae are reddish brown and the head and thorax anteriorly are covered with reddish-brown hairs. The upperside of the thorax is grey with white hairs and the abdomen is black. The underside of the head, thorax and abdomen are white.

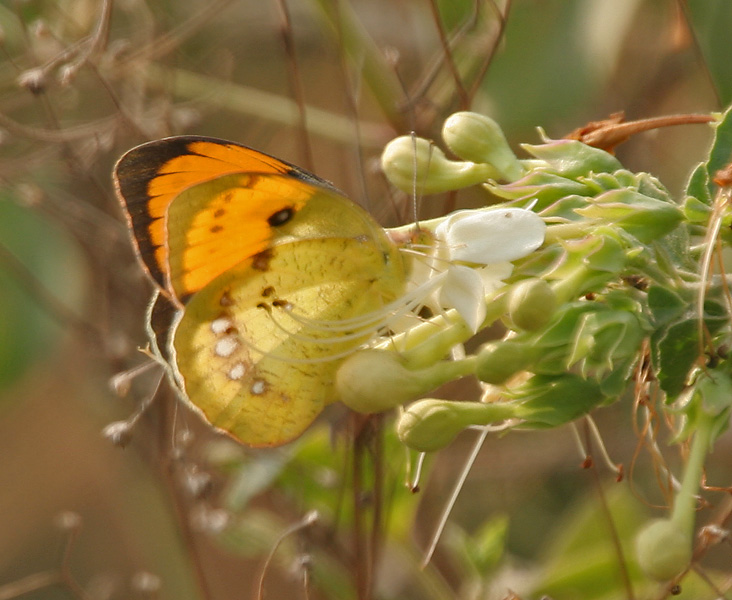
Dry-season brood, male at Hodal in Faridabad district of Haryana, India

The female is similar with the upper forewing having the orange patch on the black apical area narrower, posteriorly truncate and not extending so far down. There is also an outer transverse series of four black spots on the orange parch in interspaces 2 to 5. The underside is similar to that of the male but the markings are slightly larger. The antennae, head, thorax and abdomen are also similar.

=== Dry-season brood ===
In both sexes this differs less from the wet-season form than it does in Ixias pyrene and Ixias verna. The characteristic dry-season markings on the underside are more visible, on some occasions very much more pronounced.

The wingspan in both sexes is 54–56 mm.

== Distribution ==
The white orange tip is found from the north-west Himalayas to Kumaon, Punjab, Bengal, central, western and southern India and Sri Lanka.

== Food plants ==
The food plant for the larvae is Capparis grandis, a caper shrub in the family Capparaceae.

== See also ==
- List of butterflies of India (Pieridae)
