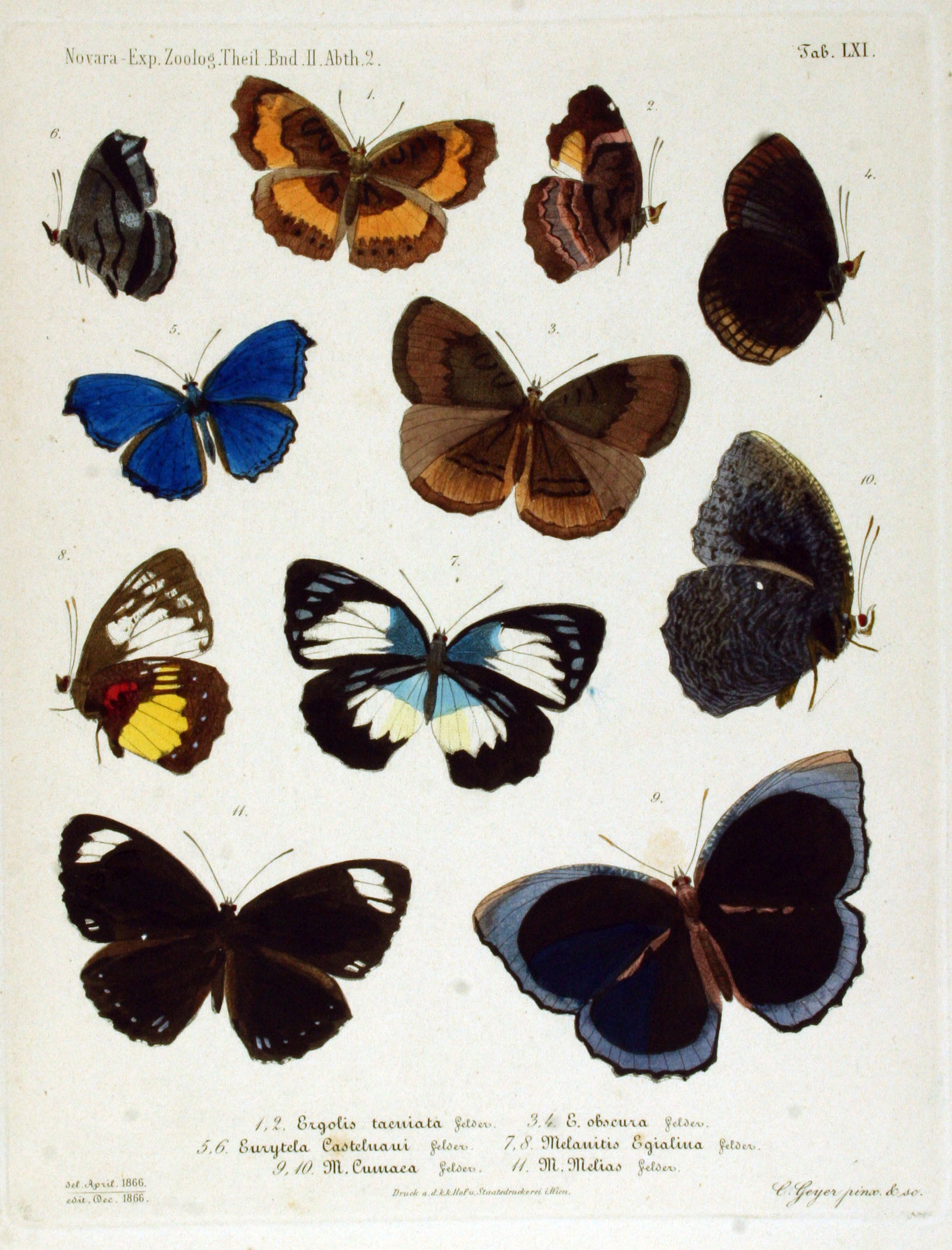

Scientific classification
- Kingdom: Animalia
- Phylum: Arthropoda
- Clade: Pancrustacea
- Class: Insecta
- Order: Lepidoptera
- Family: Nymphalidae
- Genus: Ariadne
- Species: A. taeniata

Binomial name
- Ariadne taeniata (C. & R. Felder, 1861)

Synonyms
- Ergolis taeniata C. & R. Felder, 1861; Ergolis adelpha C. & R. Felder, 1861

= Ariadne taeniata =

Species of butterfly

Ariadne taeniata is a species of biblidine butterfly endemic to the Philippines

== Subspecies ==
- A. t. taeniata (northern Philippines)
- A. t. adelpha (C. & R. Felder, 1861) (Philippines)
