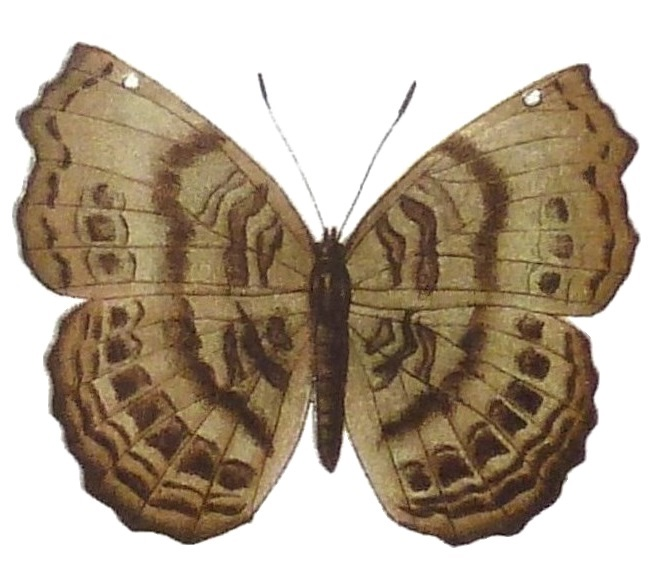
- In Adalbert Seitz's Fauna Africana

Scientific classification
- Kingdom: Animalia
- Phylum: Arthropoda
- Clade: Pancrustacea
- Class: Insecta
- Order: Lepidoptera
- Family: Nymphalidae
- Genus: Ariadne
- Species: A. pagenstecheri

Binomial name
- Ariadne pagenstecheri (Suffert, 1904)

Synonyms
- Ergolis pagenstecheri Suffert, 1904; Ergolis murina Bartel, 1905; Ergolis pagenstecheri f. aurantiaca Heron, 1909

= Ariadne pagenstecheri =

Scalloped castor

Species of butterfly

Ariadne pagenstecheri, the Pagenstecher's castor or scalloped castor, is a butterfly in the family Nymphalidae. It is found in Nigeria, Cameroon, the Central African Republic, southern Sudan, Uganda, Rwanda, Burundi, western Kenya, north-western Tanzania and the eastern and central parts of the Democratic Republic of the Congo. The habitat consists of the margins of sub-montane and montane forests.

The larvae feed on Tragia brevipes.
