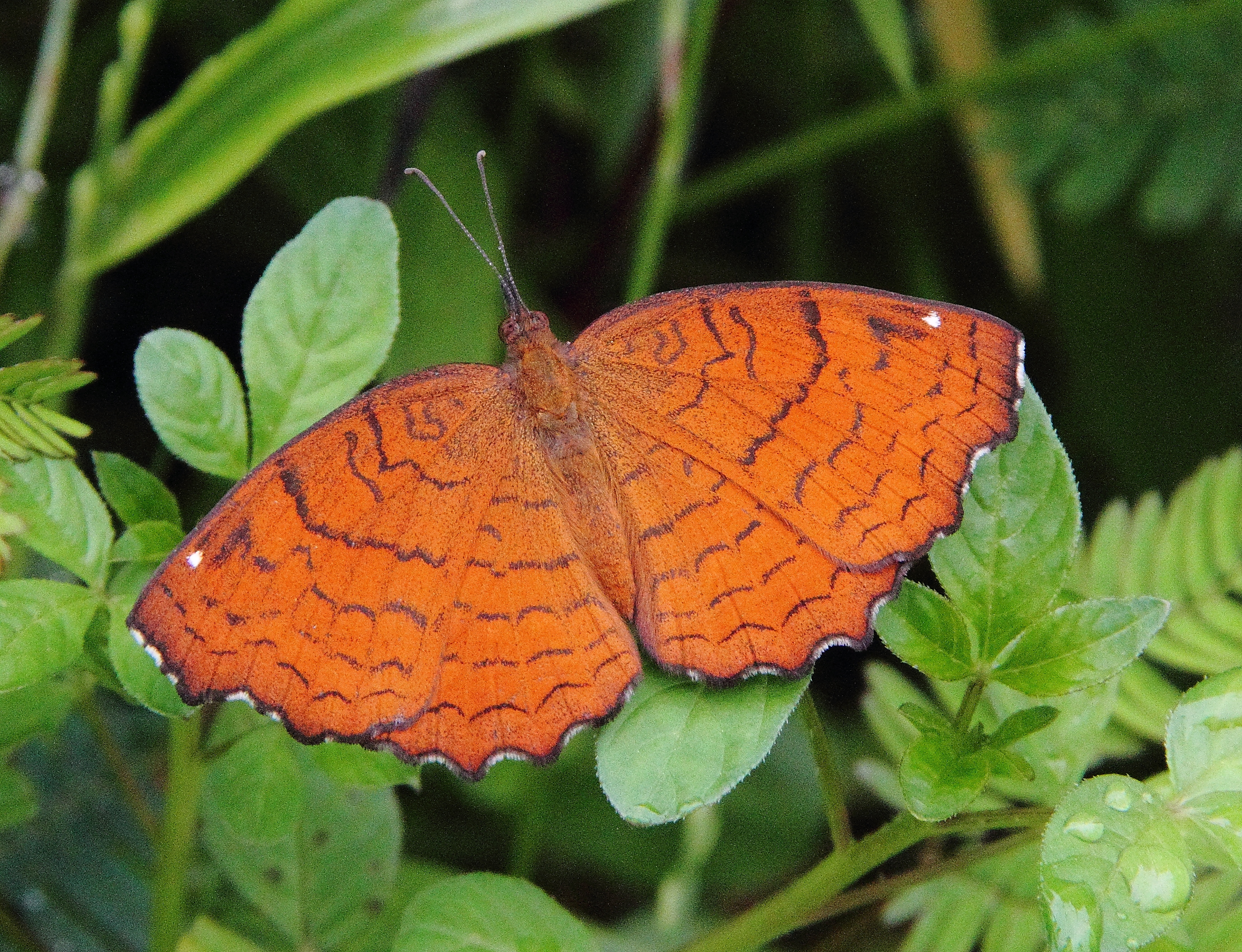
- Ariadne ariadne

Scientific classification
- Kingdom: Animalia
- Phylum: Arthropoda
- Clade: Pancrustacea
- Class: Insecta
- Order: Lepidoptera
- Family: Nymphalidae
- Tribe: Biblidini
- Genus: Ariadne; Horsfield, [1829]

Synonyms
- Ergolis Boisduval, [1836]

= Ariadne (butterfly) =

Genus of brush-footed butterflies

Ariadne is a genus of nymphalid butterflies, commonly called castors, found from Sub-Saharan Africa to South-East Asia. It was erected by Thomas Horsfield in 1829. The genus was named after Ariadne the daughter of Minos, king of Crete.

== Species ==
Listed alphabetically:

- Ariadne actisanes (Hewitson, 1875)
- Ariadne albifascia (Joicey & Talbot, 1921)
- Ariadne ariadne (Linnaeus, 1763) – angled castor (India, China, Ceylon, Indonesia, Vietnam)
- Ariadne celebensis Holland, 1898 – Celebes castor
- Ariadne enotrea (Cramer, [1779]) – African castor
- Ariadne isaeus (Wallace, 1869) – Malayan castor
- Ariadne merione (Cramer, [1777]) – common castor (Ceylon, India, Burma, Malaysia, Vietnam)
- Ariadne merionoides (Holland, 1891) – Holland's castor
- Ariadne obscura (C. & R. Felder, [1867])
- Ariadne pagenstecheri (Suffert, 1904) – Pagenstecher's castor (Cameroon, Rwanda, Burundi, eastern Zaire, Uganda, western Kenya, north-western Tanzania)
- Ariadne personata (Joicey & Talbot, 1921)
- Ariadne specularia (Fruhstorfer, 1899) (Cambodia, Vietnam)
- Ariadne taeniata (C. & R. Felder, 1861) (Indonesia)
- Ariadne timora (Wallace, 1869) (Timor)
