= Ariadne personata =

Scientific classification
- Kingdom: Animalia
- Phylum: Arthropoda
- Clade: Pancrustacea
- Class: Insecta
- Order: Lepidoptera
- Family: Nymphalidae
- Genus: Ariadne
- Species: A. personata

Binomial name
- Ariadne personata (Joicey & Talbot, 1921)

Synonyms
- Ergolis personata Joicey & Talbot, 1921

Species of butterfly

Ariadne personata is a butterfly in the family Nymphalidae. It is found in Cameroon and the Democratic Republic of the Congo (Mongala, Uele, Ituri, Tshopo, Tshuapa, Kasai and Sankuru).
