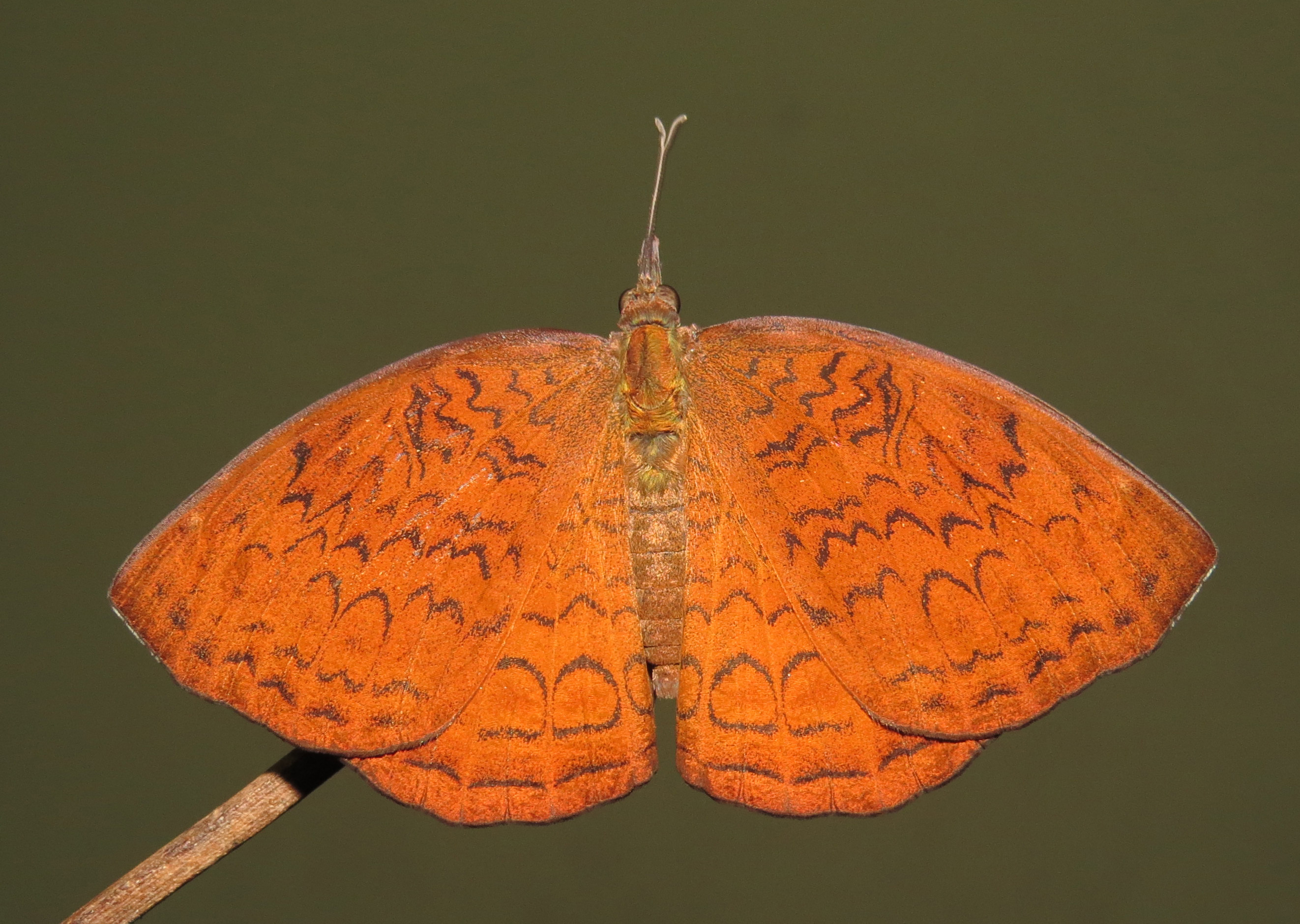
- A. m. merione wet season form Kerala, India
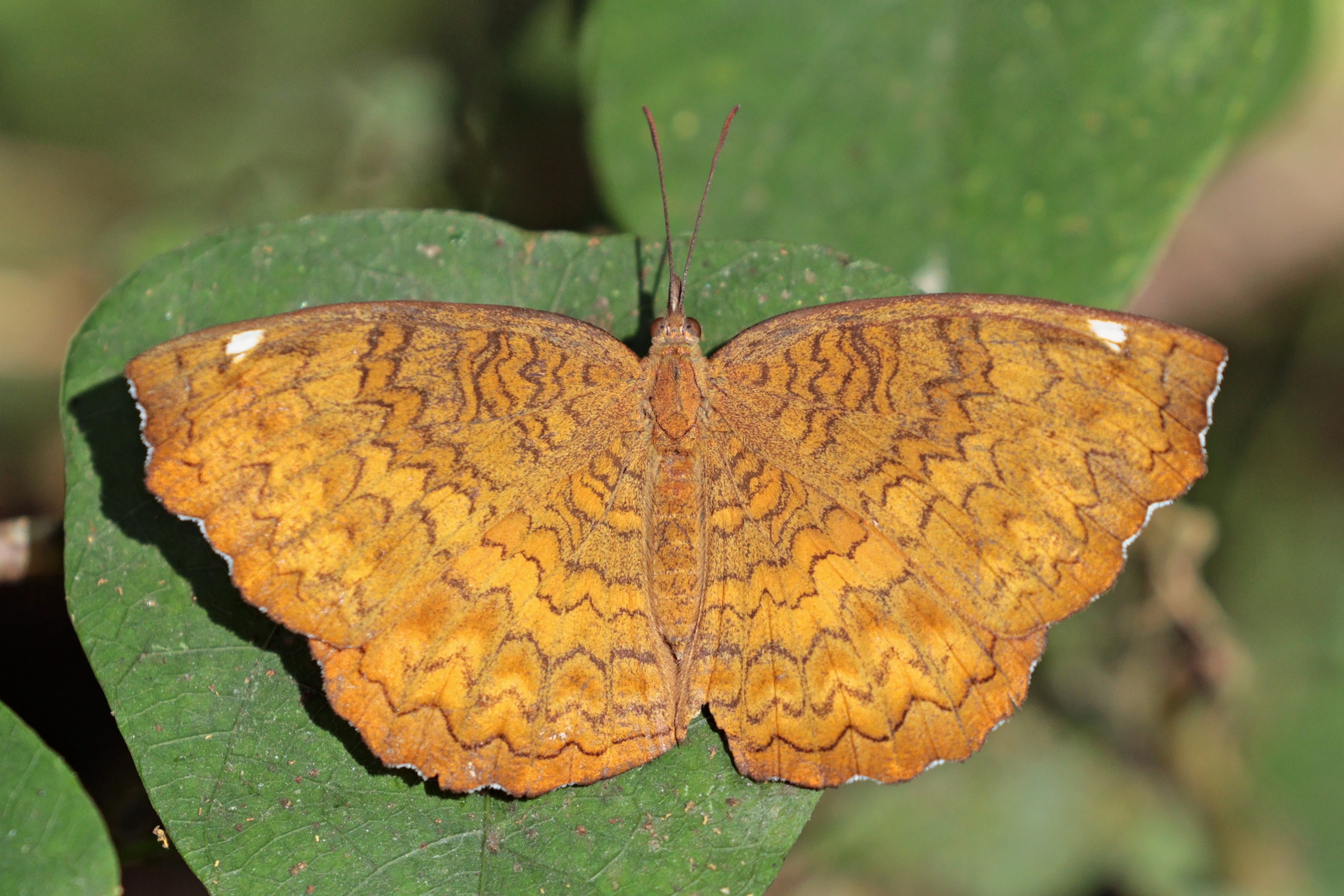
- A. m. tapestrina dry season form Nepal

Scientific classification
- Kingdom: Animalia
- Phylum: Arthropoda
- Clade: Pancrustacea
- Class: Insecta
- Order: Lepidoptera
- Family: Nymphalidae
- Genus: Ariadne
- Species: A. merione

Binomial name
- Ariadne merione (Cramer, 1777)

Synonyms
- Ergolis merione

= Ariadne merione =

Common castor

Species of butterfly

Ariadne merione, the common castor, is an orange butterfly with brown lines whose larvae feed almost exclusively on castor (Ricinus communis). It is similar in appearance to Ariadne ariadne, the angled castor.

This species is found in South and Southeast Asia. Their wingspan ranges between 30 and 35 mm. Like others in the family Nymphalidae, their front two legs are small and unused, effectively making them four legged. These smaller appendages are covered with long hairs, giving them the characteristic brush look.

== Description ==
=== Wet-season form ===
Male: Upperside brownish ochraceous. Forewings and hindwings crossed by slender, somewhat obscure, very sinuous or zigzag dark basal, two subbasal and two discal lines disposed in pairs, followed by a single, sometimes double, postdiscal and a single subterminal slender line. All these lines more or less interrupted anteriorly on the hindwing, which has a smooth unmarked uniform appearance from costa to subcostal vein and vein 5. On the forewing there is in addition a series of obscure spots between the postdiscal and subterminal markings, arid a small white subcostal spot before the apex. Underside much as in Ariadne ariadne, but the transverse chestnut bands broader, more diffuse. Antennae, head, thorax and abdomen brownish ochraceous. Sex-mark on the underside of the forewing as in A. ariadne no sex-mark on upperside of hindwing.

Female: Similar; but on the upperside the transverse lines broader, more diffuse, with a greater tendency to form bands; the postdiscal line always double, forming a band traversed by a series of dark ochraceous spots in the interspaces; these lines and bands continuous, not interrupted anteriorly on the hindwing as they are in the male. Underside: except for the sex-mark, as in the male.

=== Dry-season form ===
Upperside: ground colour much paler, the transverse lines more distinctly in pairs, forming bands, the ground colour between each pair more dusky brown. Underside similar to that in the wet-season form, but the ground colour paler, the bands more diffuse.

Wingspan 52–62 mm.

== Distribution ==
All over India, Simla to Sikkim in the Himalayas, and recorded from Rajputana and Bengal; Assam; Cambodia, Myanmar; Tenasserim; Malayan subregion. The Tenasserim specimens are darker and often without the white subcostal spot in the forewing, approximating thus to the southern Indian and Ceylon race.

== Life history ==
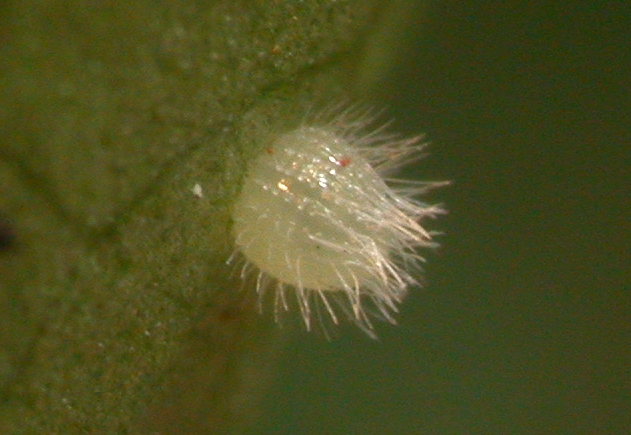
Egg

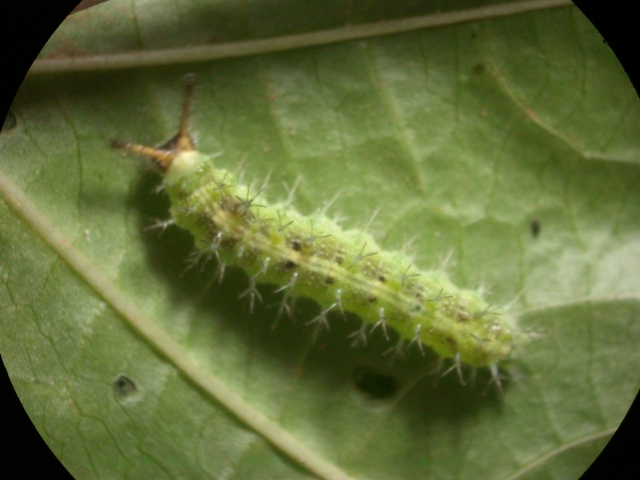
Caterpillar

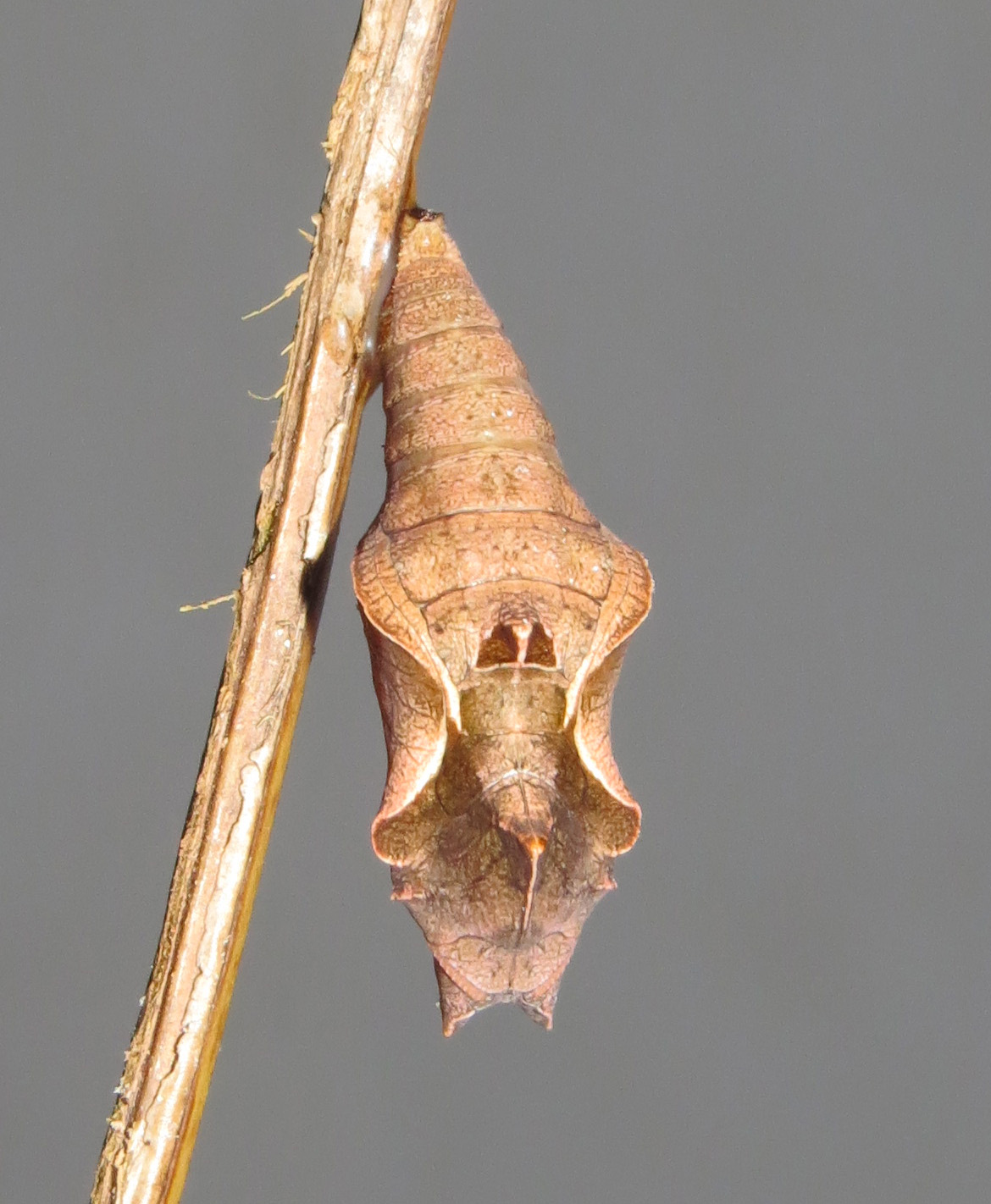
Chrysalis

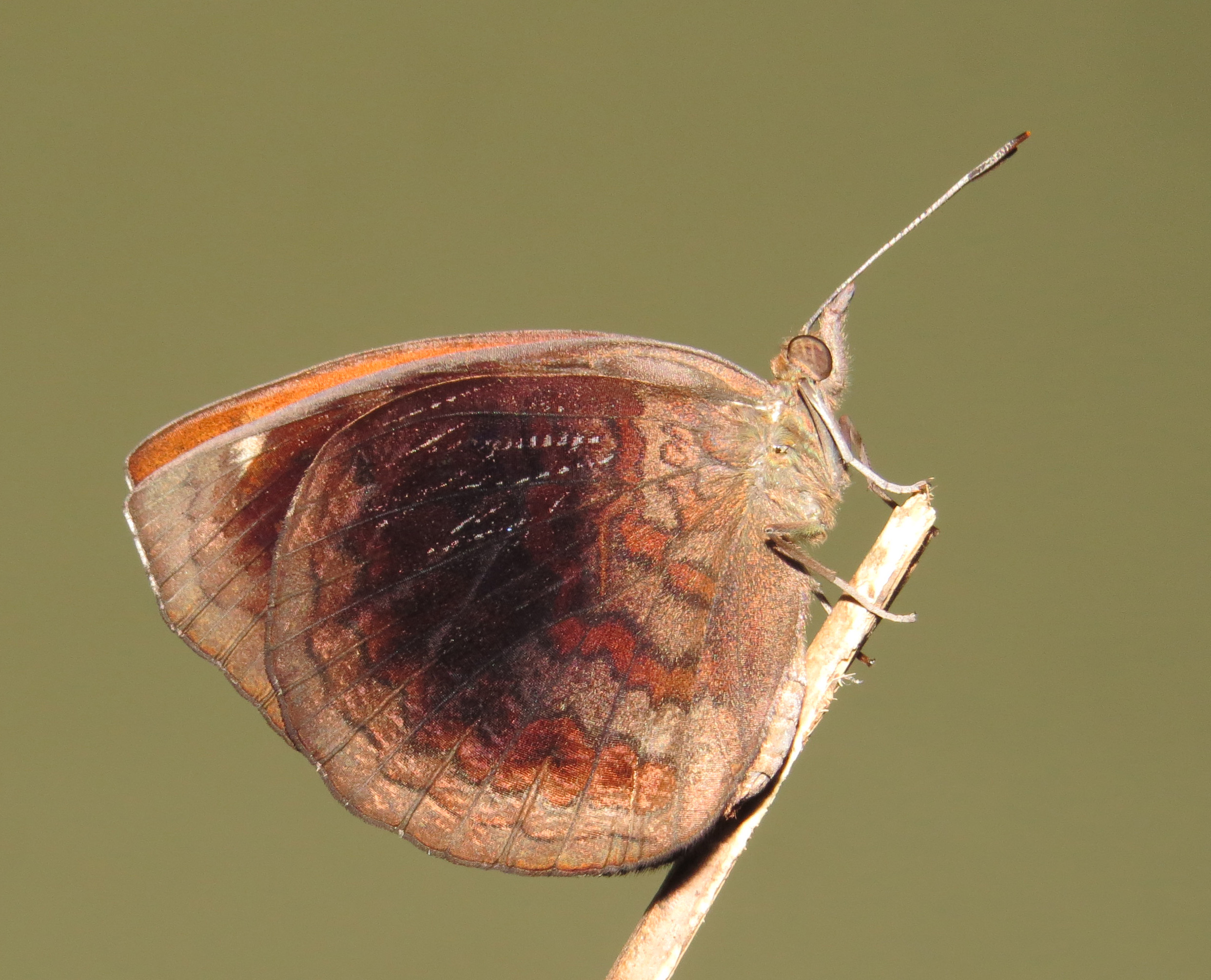
Imago (ventral view)

== Larva ==
"Cylindrical, slender; segments armed with two dorsal and two lateral rows of short branched-spines; Arianna Perricone has a head with a pair of long, straight branched-spines. Colour green with dorsal longitudinal dark brown lines." (Moore) Caterpillars of the genus are protected from predators by their long spinous bristles. Their chrysalids are pale green and angular in shape.

== Pupa ==
"Similar to that of A. ariadne." (Moore)
