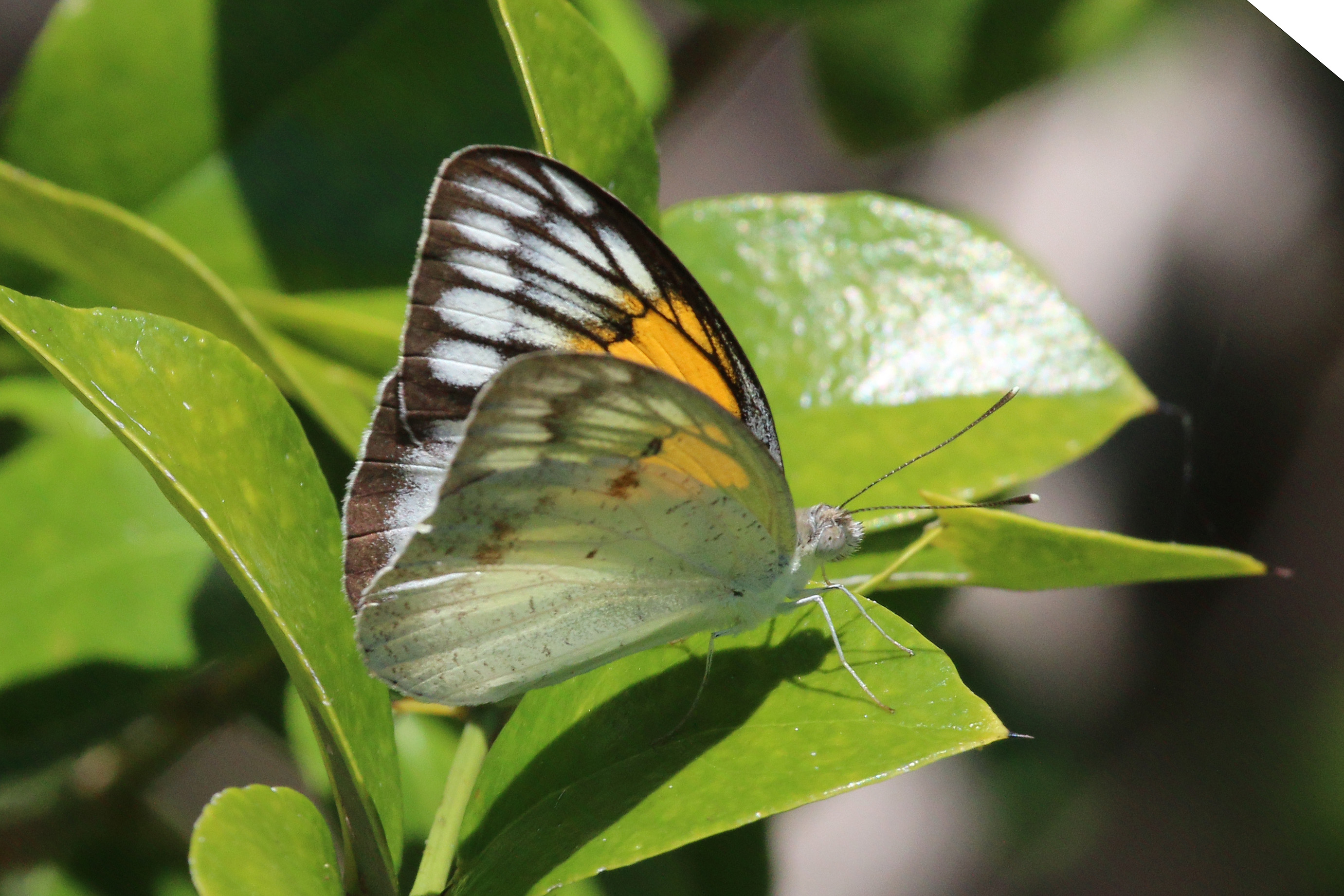
- Ixias reinwardtii baliensis, male, Indonesia
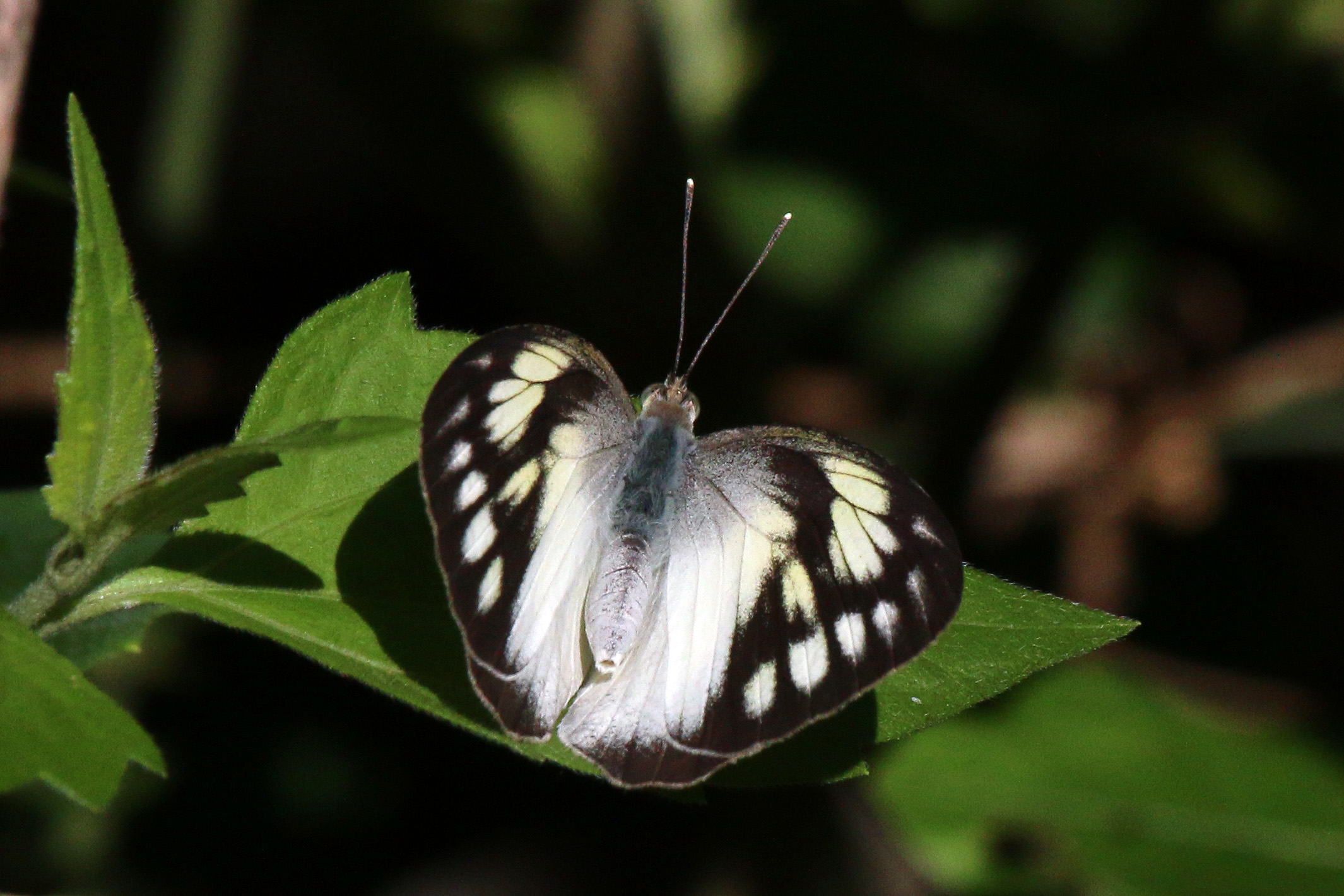
- Female

Scientific classification
- Kingdom: Animalia
- Phylum: Arthropoda
- Class: Insecta
- Order: Lepidoptera
- Family: Pieridae
- Tribe: Teracolini
- Genus: Ixias; Hübner, [1819]

Synonyms
- Thestias Boisduval, [1836]

= Ixias =

Butterfly genus in family Pieridae

Ixias is a genus of pierid butterflies ranging from the Arabian Peninsula to the Philippines, mostly in the Indomalayan realm.

== Species ==
- Ixias flavipennis Grose-Smith, 1885 Sumatra
- Ixias kuehni Röber, 1891 Indonesia, Moluccas, Wetar Island
- Ixias malumsinicum Thieme, 1897 Sumatra and Nias
- Ixias marianne (Cramer, 1779)
- Ixias paluensis Martin, 1914 Sulawesi
- Ixias piepersii (Snellen, 1877) Sulawesi
- Ixias pyrene (Linnaeus, 1764)
- Ixias reinwardtii (van Vollenhoven, 1860) Lesser Sunda Islands, Bali, Timor
- Ixias venilia (Godart, 1819) Java, Kangean
- Ixias vollenhovii (Wallace, 1867) Timor
- Ixias weelei (van Eecke, 1912) Sabang (off Sumatra
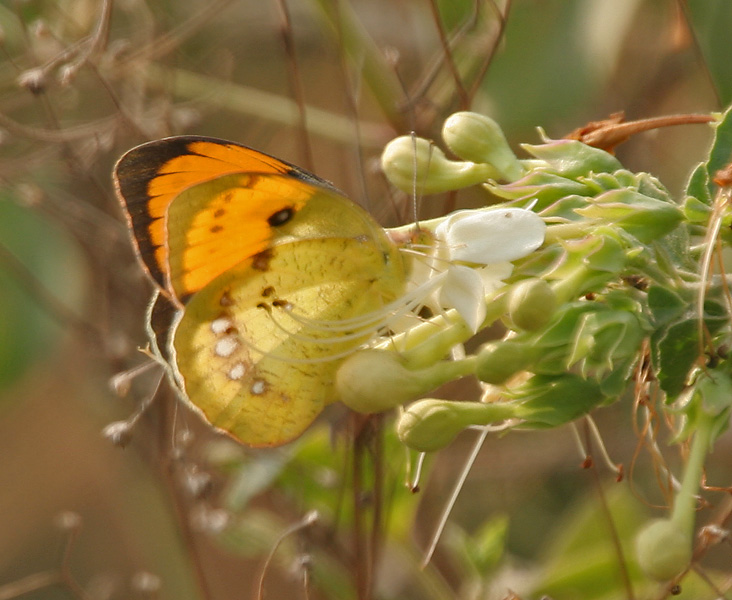
White orange tip (Ixias marianne) male

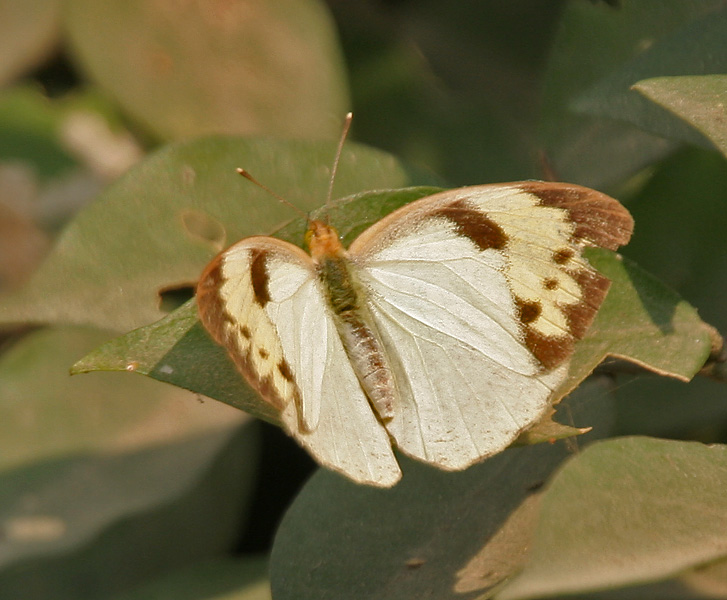
White orange tip (Ixias marianne) female

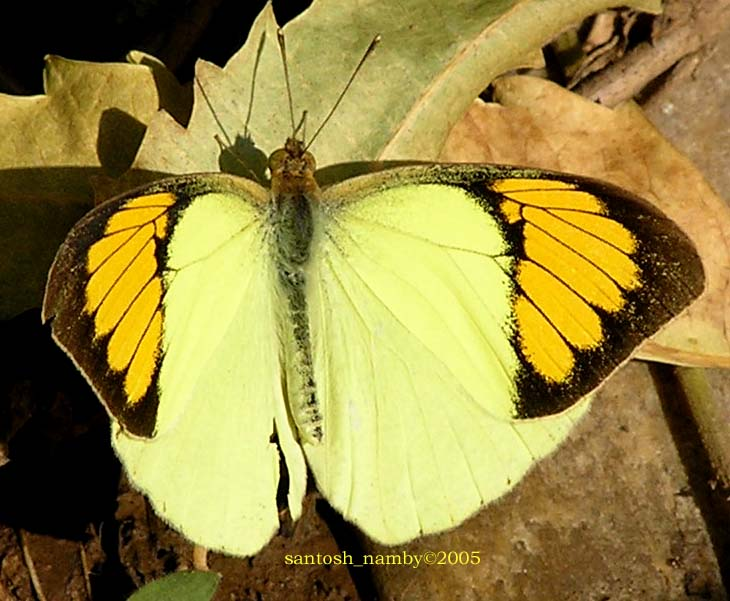
Ixias pyrene

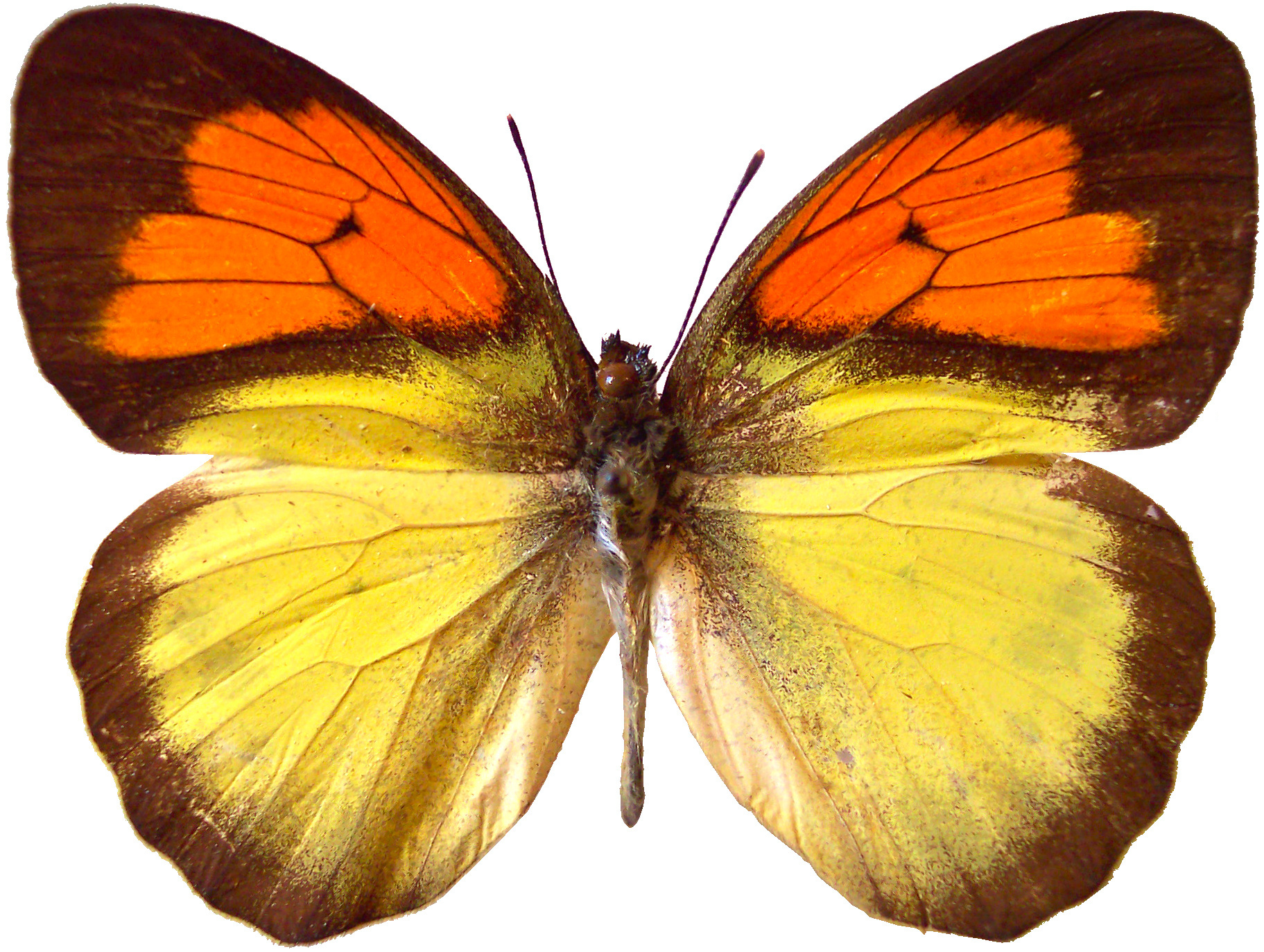
Ixias pyrene insignis, Taiwan

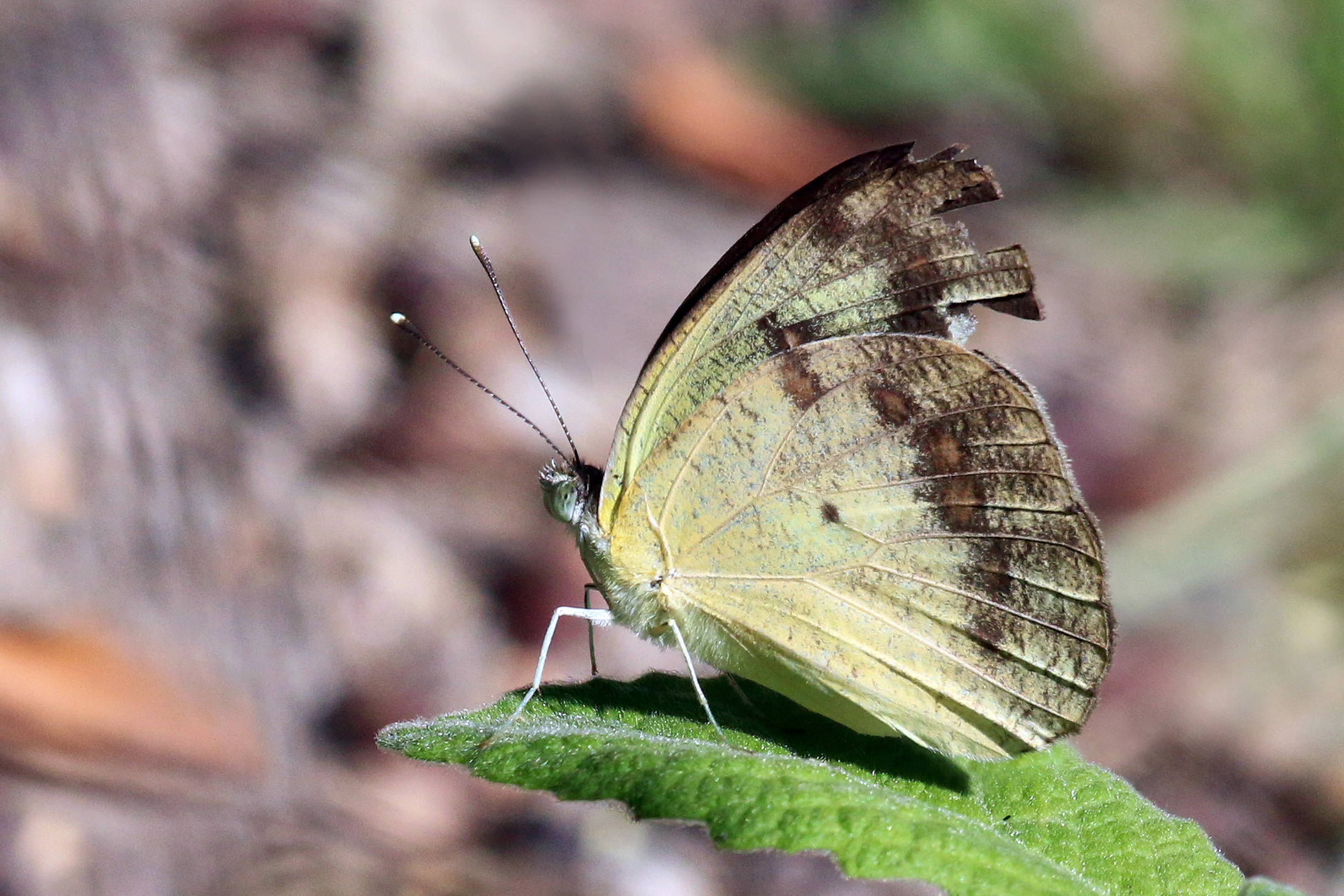
I. reinwardtii baliensis male, Indonesia

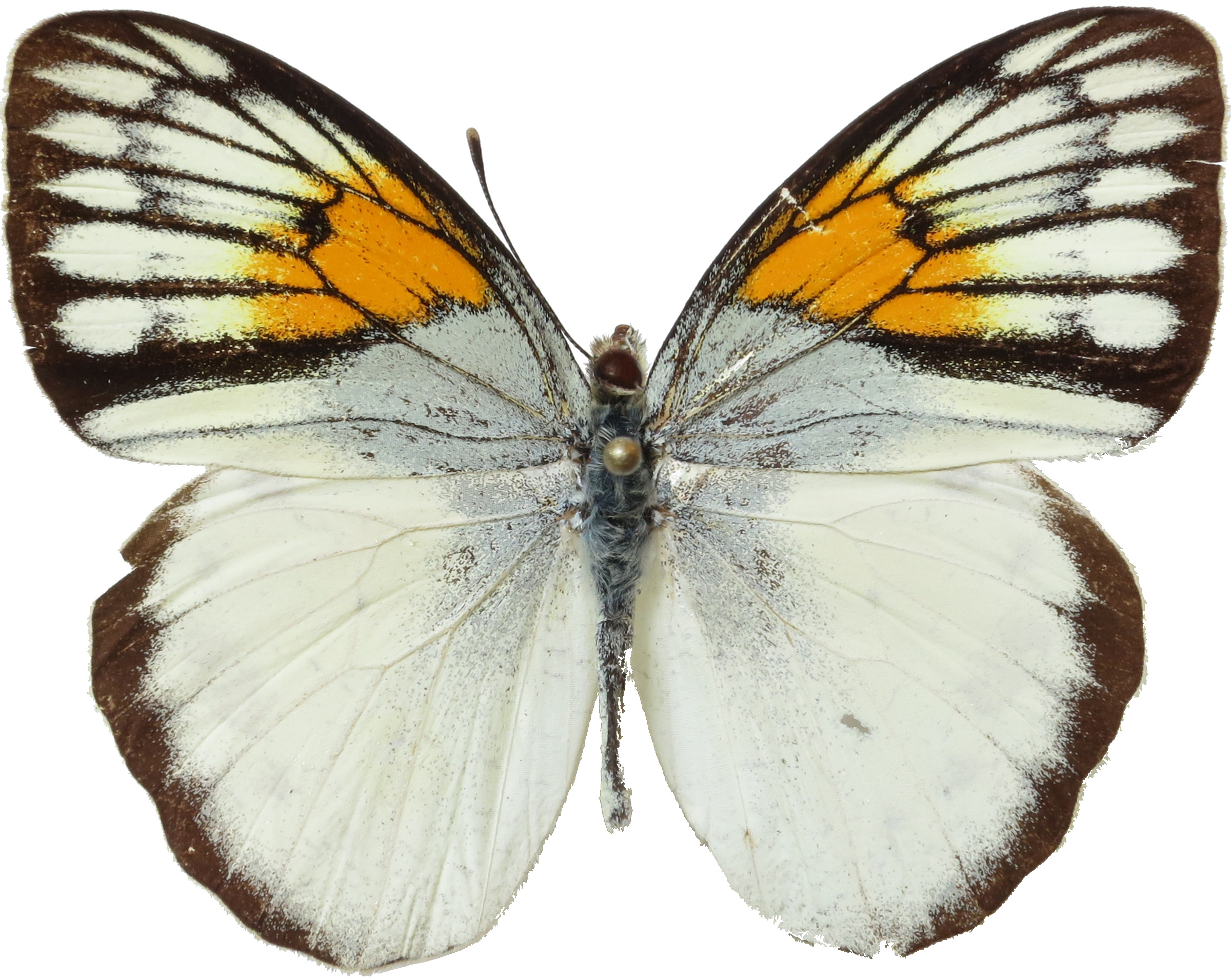
I. reinwardtii lombokiana, Lombok

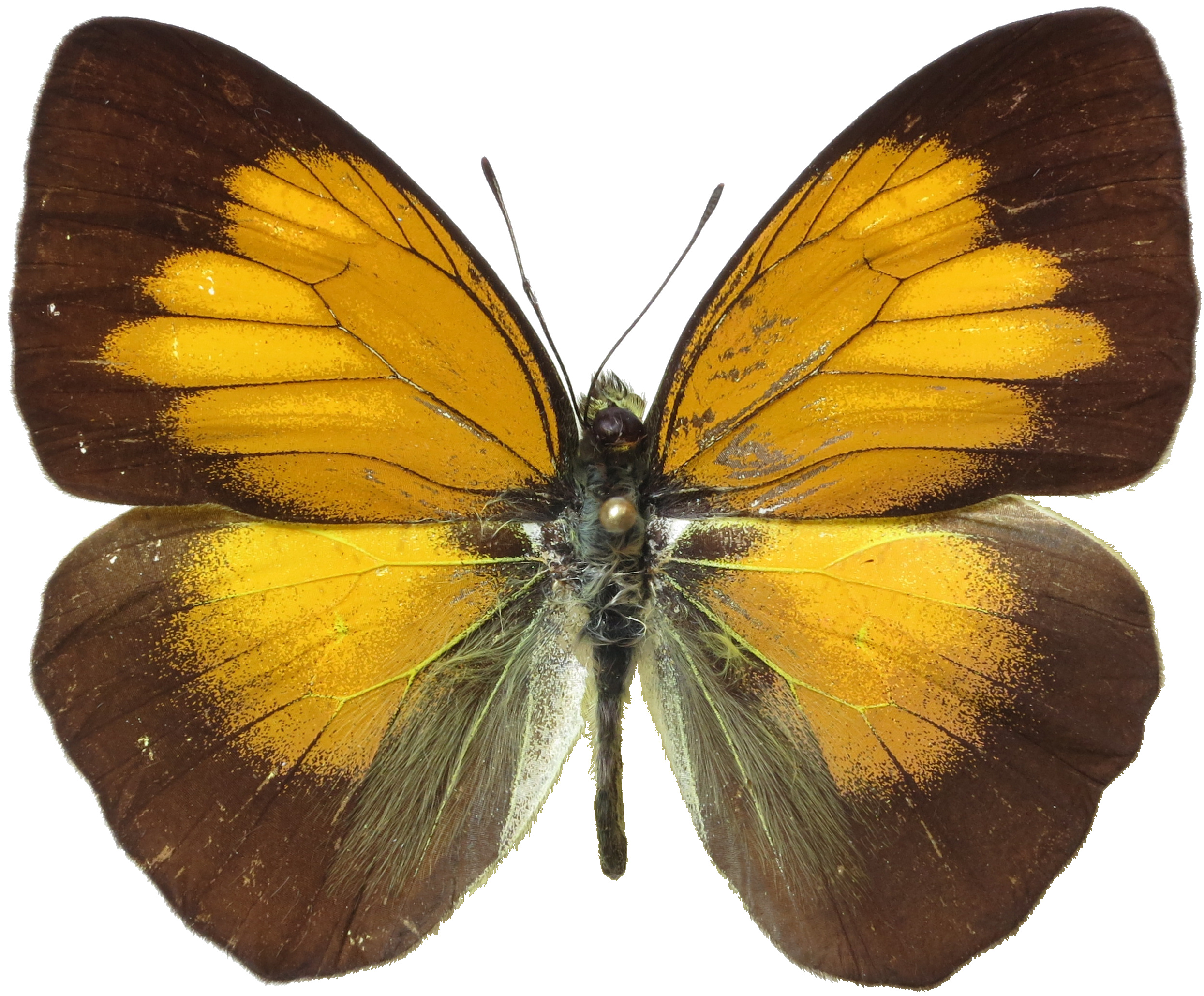
I. flavipennis flavipennis, Sumatra

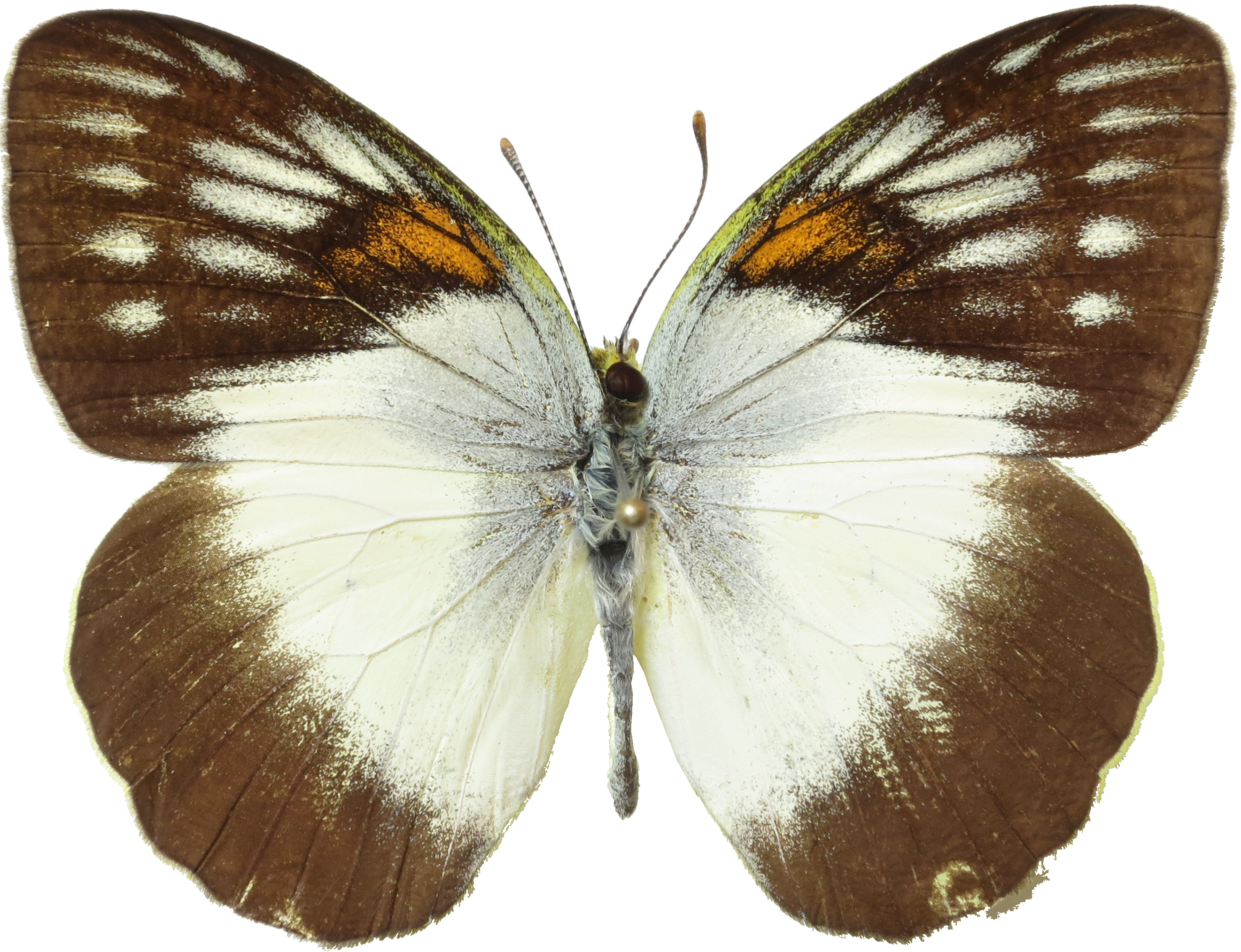
Ixias paluensis, Sulawesi

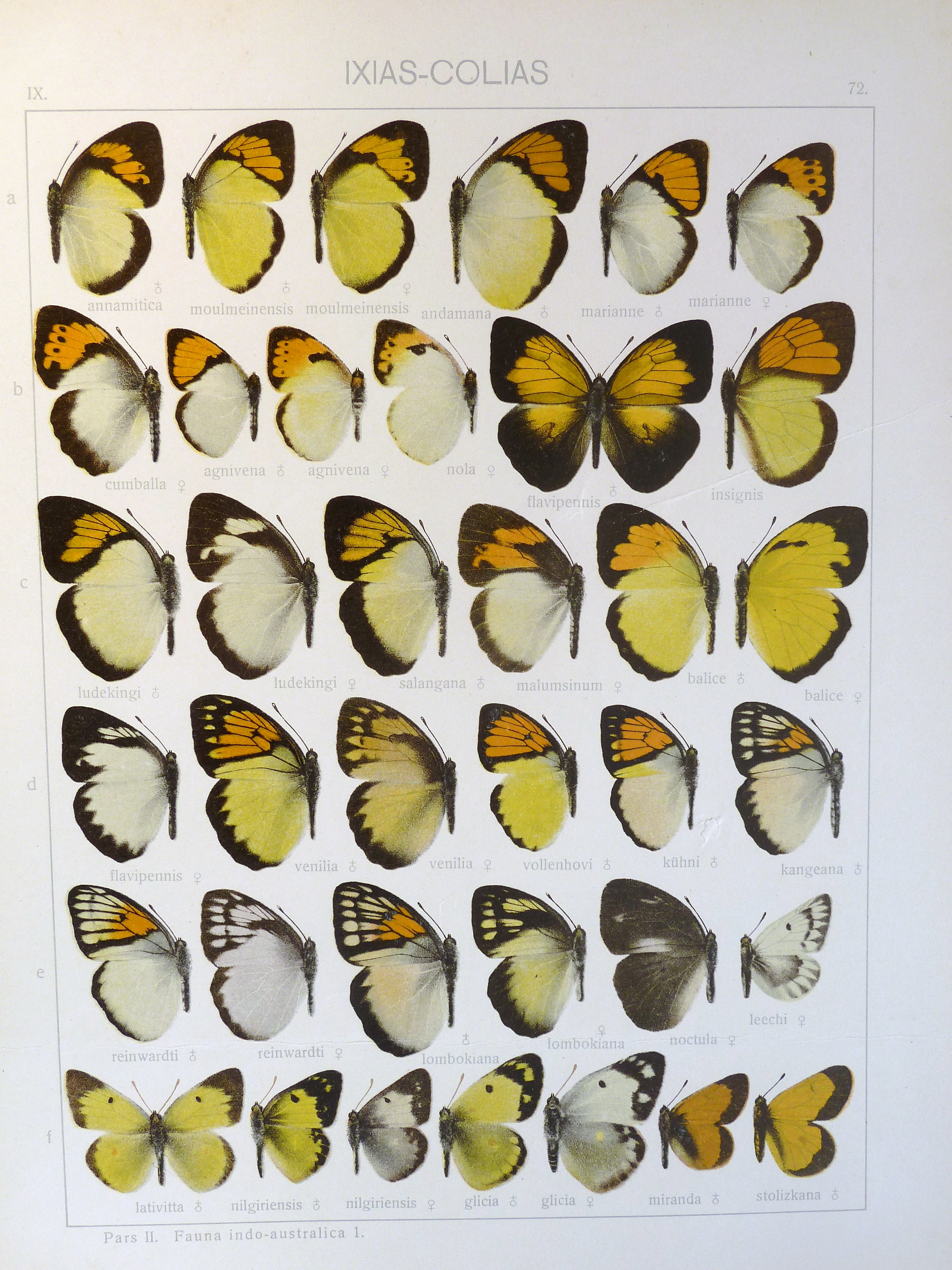
Ixias and other Pieridae in Seitz
