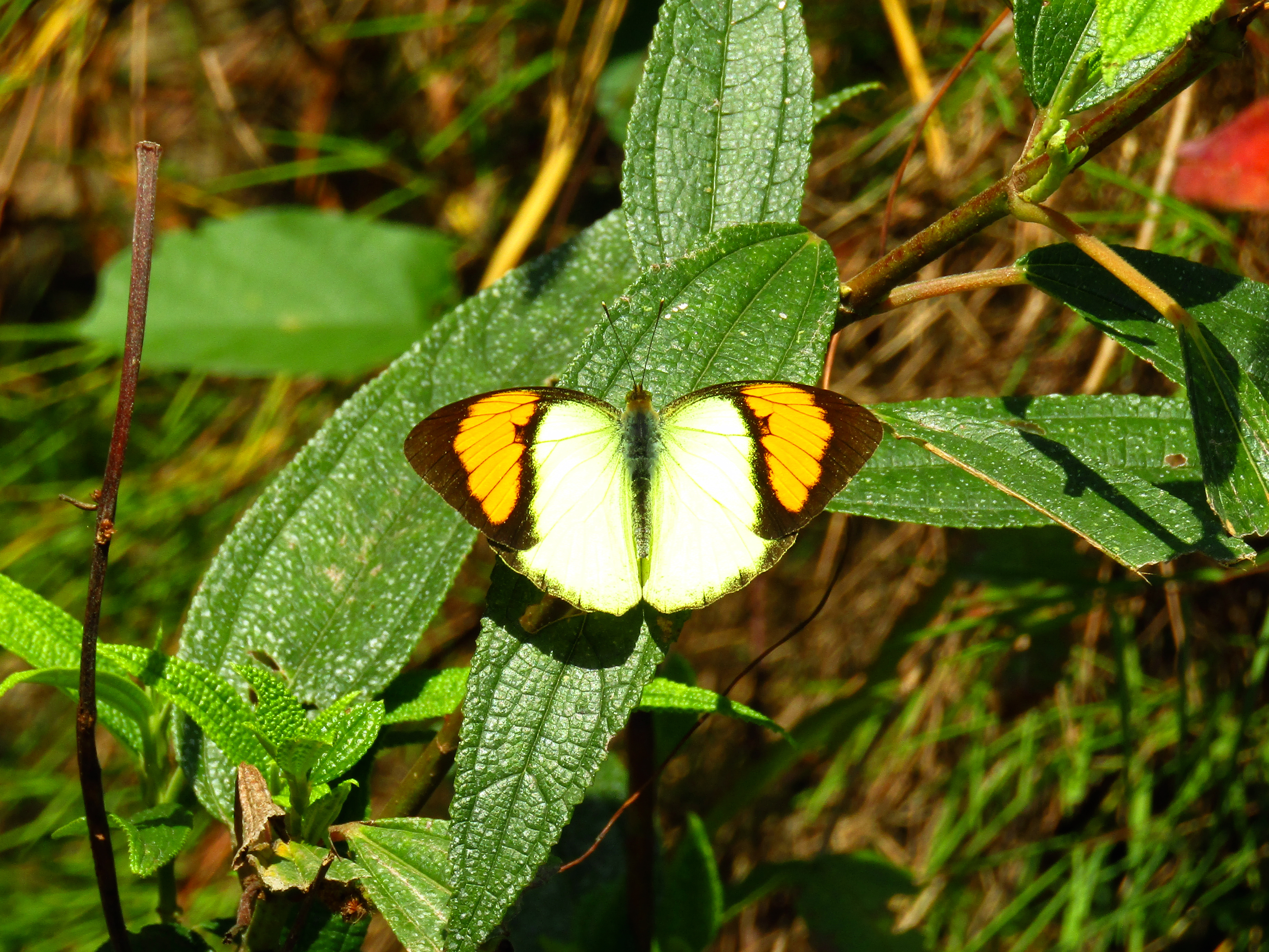
- Yellow Orange-tip, Male from Buxa Tiger Reserve
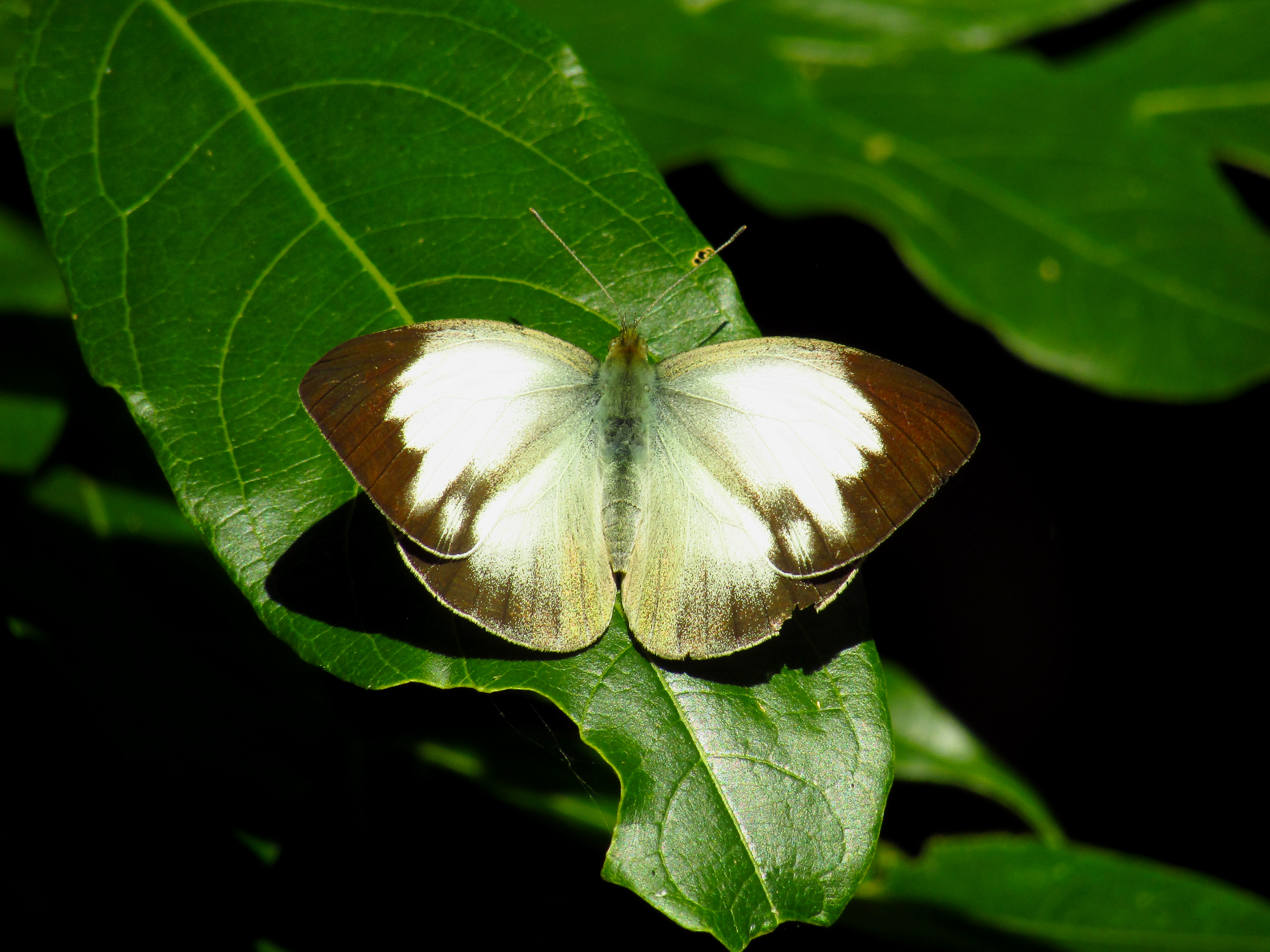
- Yellow Orange-tip, Female from Buxa Tiger Reserve

Scientific classification
- Kingdom: Animalia
- Phylum: Arthropoda
- Class: Insecta
- Order: Lepidoptera
- Family: Pieridae
- Genus: Ixias
- Species: I. pyrene

Binomial name
- Ixias pyrene Linnaeus, 1764

= Ixias pyrene =

Yellow orange tip

Species of butterfly

Ixias pyrene, the yellow orange tip, is a small butterfly of the family Pieridae, that is, the yellows and whites, which is found in Sri Lanka, India and southeast Asia.

== Description ==
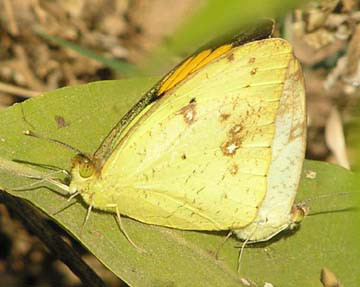
Dry-season brood, mating yellow orange tips

The species wingspan is between 50 and 55 mm.

Dry-season brood: Male upperside: deep sulphur-yellow. Forewing: base and basal half of costa thickly irrorated with black scales; apical half of the wing black, with an enclosed, large, irregularly triangular, orange-coloured patch, the apex of which is more or less broadly rounded and blunt; the orange colour extends into the apex of the cell but is interrupted there by a black discocellular spot that spreads diffusely inwards and joins the black oblique bar which forms the base of the orange patch; veins that traverse this latter, black. Hindwing: uniform with a little black scaling at extreme base; termen with a dusky-black somewhat narrow border (sometimes entirely absent) which decreases in width posteriorly.

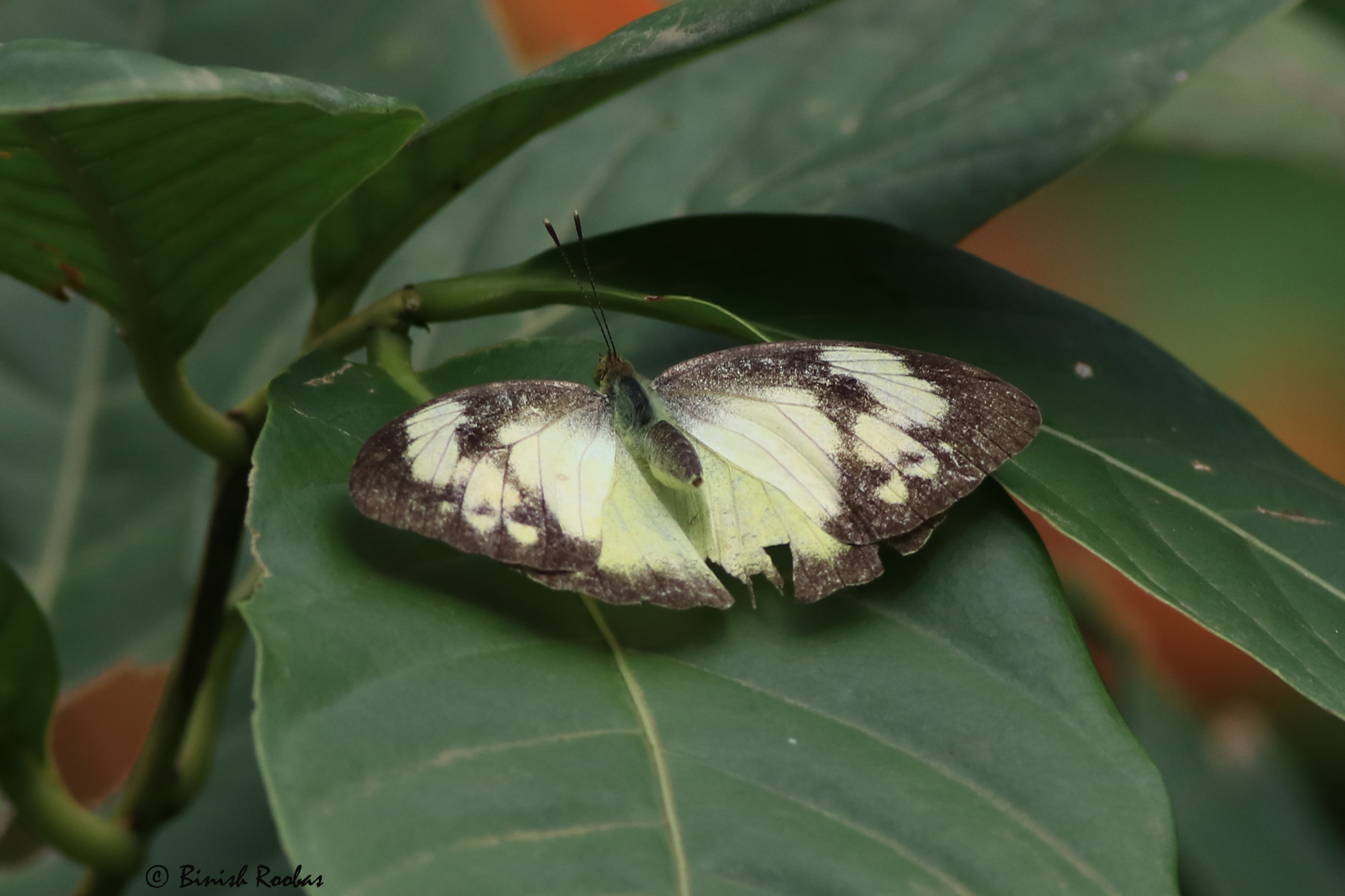
Female from Mumbai, India

Underside: a darker yellow, sparsely irrorated (sprinkled) with fusco-ferruginous short strigae and minute spots. Forewing: base and posterior area broadly, with a whitish pale virescent (greenish) tint; the strigae and minute spots most numerous towards the apex and along the termen; interspaces 4, 5, 6 and 8 with a curved sub-apical series of small, rounded, dull ferruginous spots and a similar spot on the discocellulars. Hindwing also with a ferruginous spot on the discocellulars, followed by a postdiscal series of similar spots in interspaces 3 to 8, all or most of them centred with white; the spots in interspaces 5, 6 and 8 the largest, those in 5 and 6 often coalescent. Antennae and thorax anteriorly dull ferruginous, thorax posteriorly and abdomen above fuscous black; head, thorax and abdomen beneath yellow.

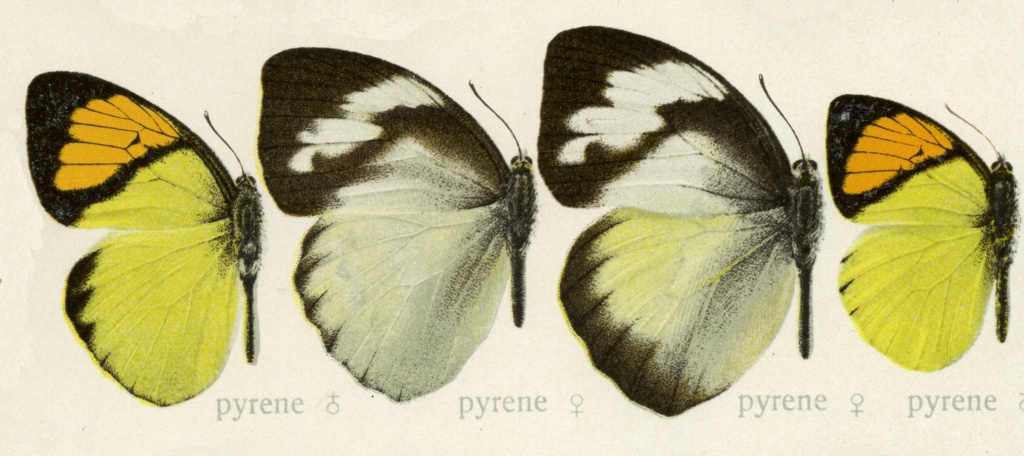

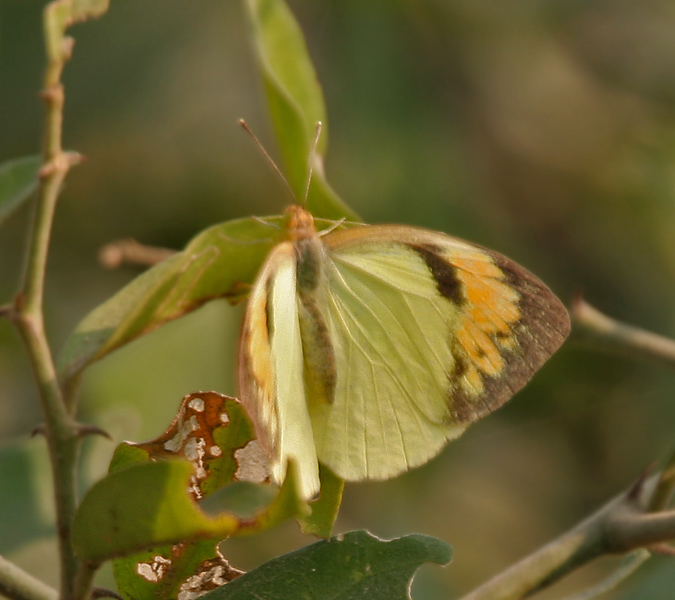
Dry-season brood, female at Hodal in Faridabad district of Haryana, India

Female upperside: white faintly tinged with yellow. Forewing: apical half black, with an enclosed, irregular, broad, oblique patch of the ground colour that extends into the upper apex of the cell, on the inner side of this the black is reduced to a short oblique bar broadened at the lower apex of the cell, from whence it is continued as a somewhat slender diffuse oblique streak to the tornus, where it broadens again abruptly and meets the black on the termen; the outer margin of the oblique white patch is irregularly crenulate, sometimes trisinuate; the black colour on the apex often forms a right angle on vein 4; on the white patch posteriorly there is a black spot in interspace 2 and another in interspace 3. Hindwing: uniform, a few subobsolete slender, fuscous, transverse strigae posteriorly; the terminal margin sometimes with (more often without) a narrow dusky black edging, broadened anteriorly at the apices of the veins.

Underside: similar to that in the male, with similar markings, the ground colour a dark dull ochraceous, the fusco-ferruginous strigae more numerous. Antennae, head, thorax and abdomen as in the male.

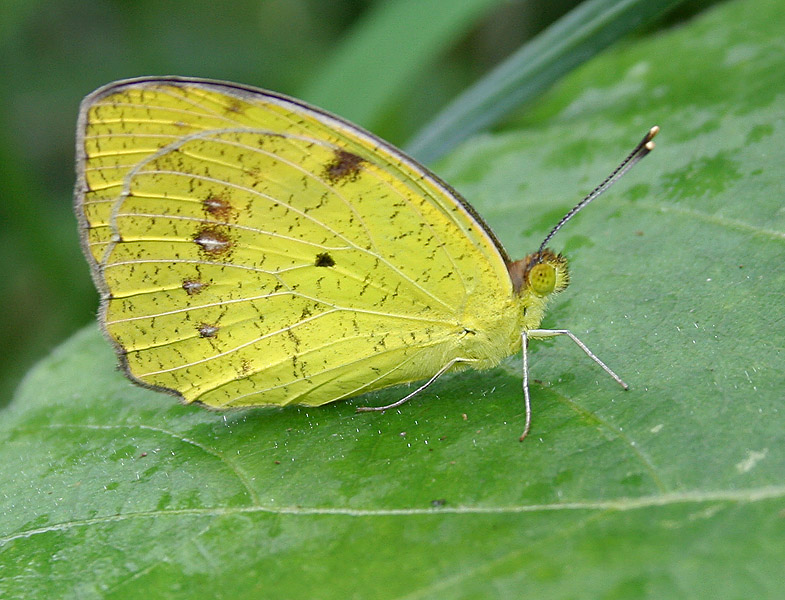
Wet-season form in Hyderabad, India

Wet-season brood: Upperside in both male and female differs in the broader, more pronounced, black terminal edging to the hindwing, which is often remarkably broad, and in the female by the ground colour which is pale yellow. Underside: the fusco-ferruginous strigae and spots often subobsolete, occasionally entirely absent in the male.

== Distribution and habitats ==
It is distributed throughout the plains and lowlands of Sri Lanka and peninsular India. It is common in dry deciduous forests, scrub and fallow lands and found throughout the year. However, it is more common during the monsoon and post-monsoon and considerably rare in the summer.

== See also ==
- List of butterflies of India (Pieridae)
