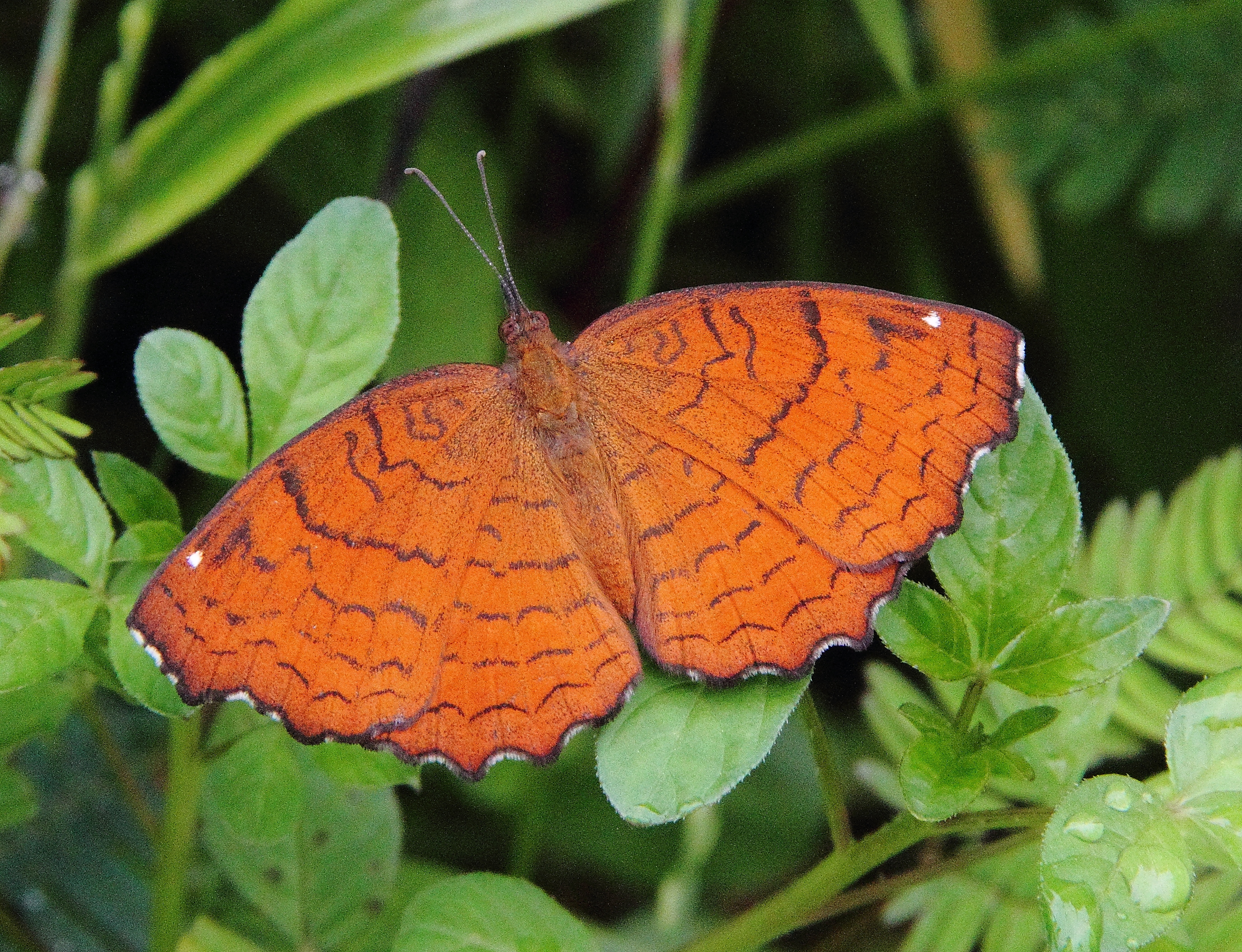

Scientific classification
- Kingdom: Animalia
- Phylum: Arthropoda
- Clade: Pancrustacea
- Class: Insecta
- Order: Lepidoptera
- Family: Nymphalidae
- Genus: Ariadne
- Species: A. ariadne

Binomial name
- Ariadne ariadne (Linnaeus, 1763)

Synonyms
- Ergolis ariadne; Ariadne coryta; Ergolis coryta

= Ariadne ariadne =

Angled castor

Species of butterfly

Ariadne ariadne, the angled castor, is a species of nymphalid butterfly found in Asia.

== Description ==
This butterfly is orange brown with wavy lines running across its wings. The margin is somewhat wavy and appears truncated at the apex of the forewing. The margin is wavy with a large angle present on the fifth vein interspace and at the tip of vein three. The tornus is broadly angulate. The hindwing termen is deeply scalloped. A prominent white spot appears towards the apex of the forewing. The cilia are white, alternated with brown. On the underside there is more brown.

The antennae, head, thorax and abdomen are ochraceous rufous.

Males have a series of dark shining scales (androconia) on the subcostal vein, veins 6 and 7 and a patch on the underside of the forewing towards the base. Females look similar but are slightly paler and lacking the androconial scales.

A, ariadne bears resemblance to Ariadne merione, the common castor, but in the angled castor, the transverse chestnut bands are narrower and less diffuse. The margins of the common castor are less wavy.

== Diet ==
The castor plant (Ricinus communis) is the most common host and gives the butterfly its name. Other hosts include Tragia cannabina, Tragia hispida, Tragia plukenetii and Tragia involucrata.

== Larva ==
The caterpillars are spiny with two rows of spines on the top. Finer spines emerge between these rows. An irregular set of small spines form a cluster at the end. The colour is variable, sometimes green with longitudinal dark brown lines, or dark brown with an interrupted broad dorsal stripe of pure white, not reaching either end.

== Pupa ==
"Slender, wing-cases somewhat dilated, a dorsal protuberance and two small cephalic points: colour variable: rigidly attached by the tail, so that if the surface is vertical, the pupa stands out horizontally."

Life cycle

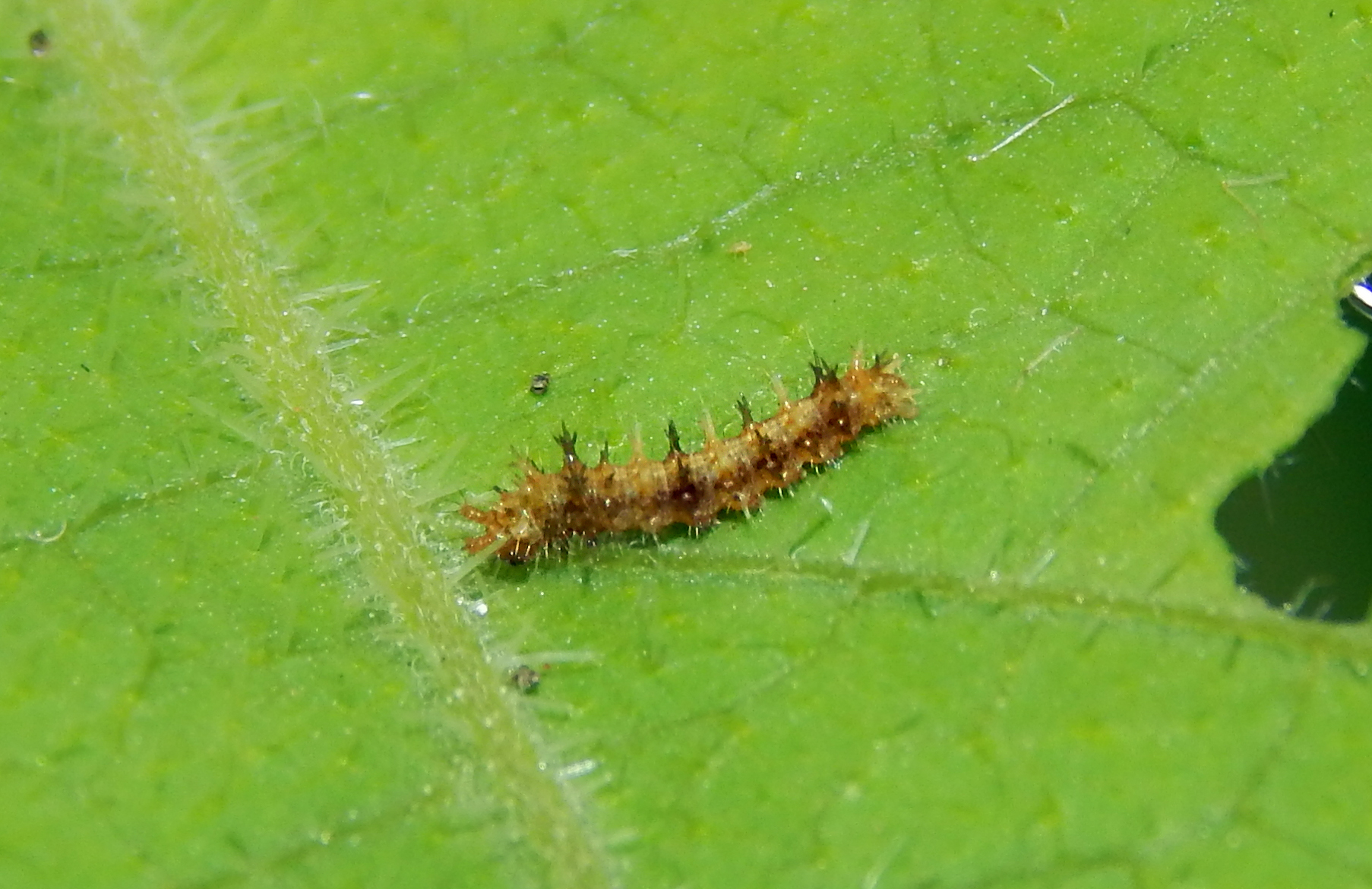
Larva (Early stage)

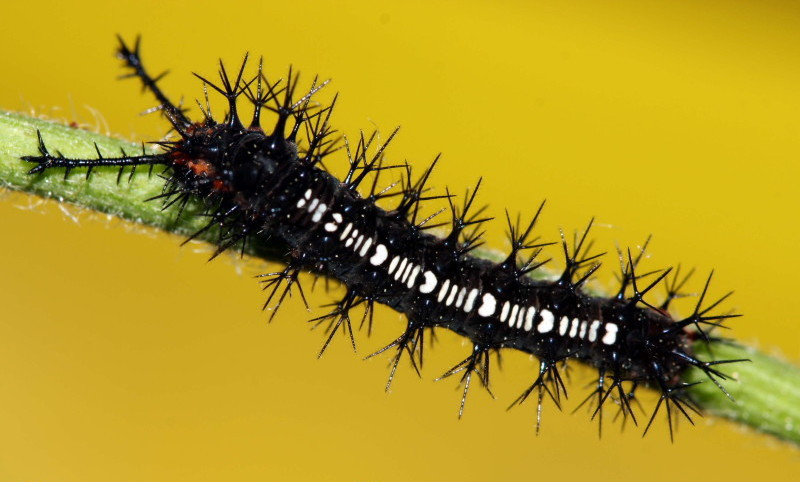
Larva

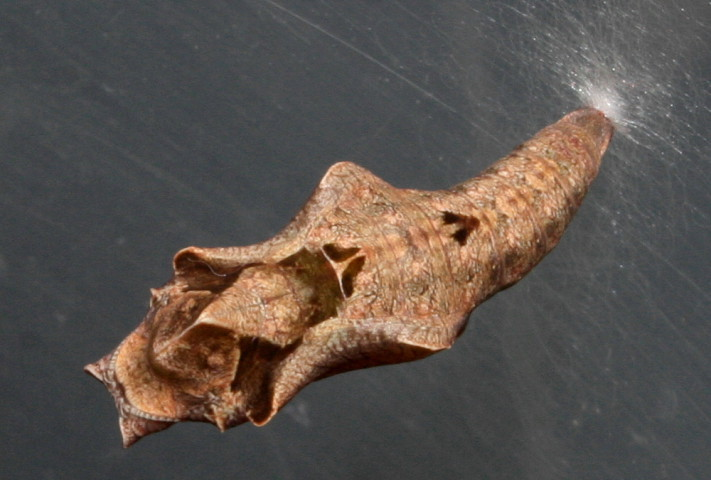
Pupa

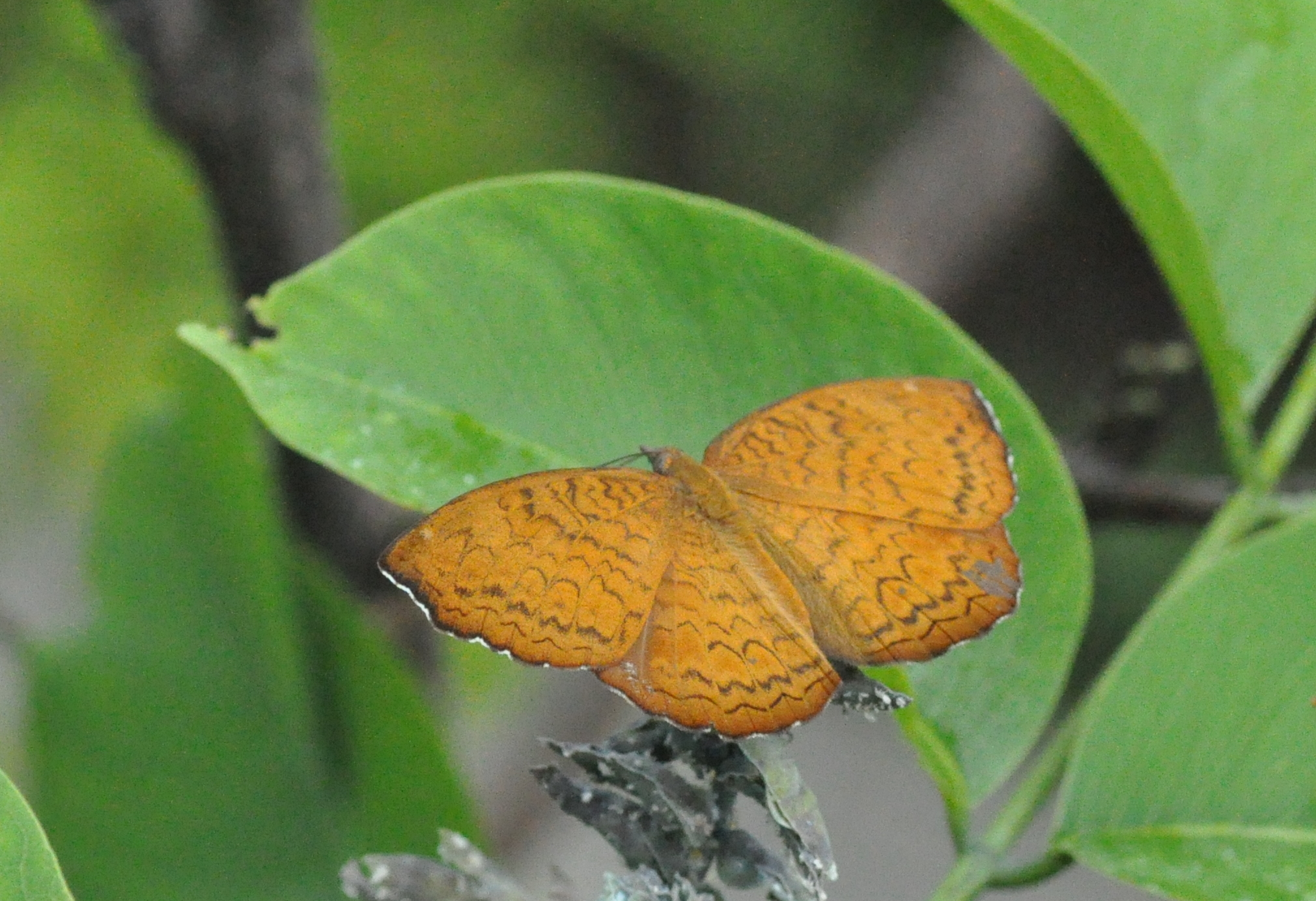
Imago (dorsal view)

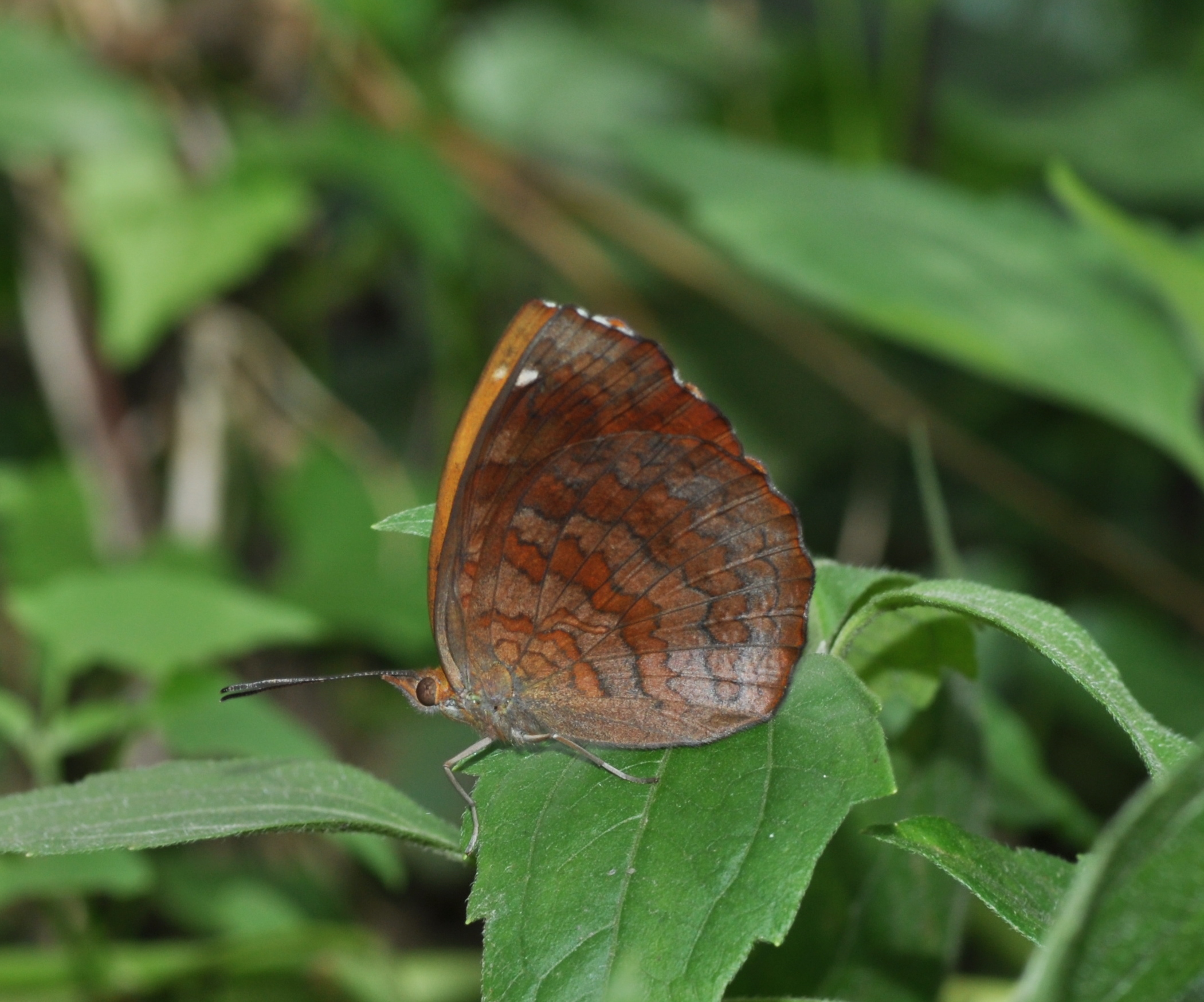
Imago (ventral view)
