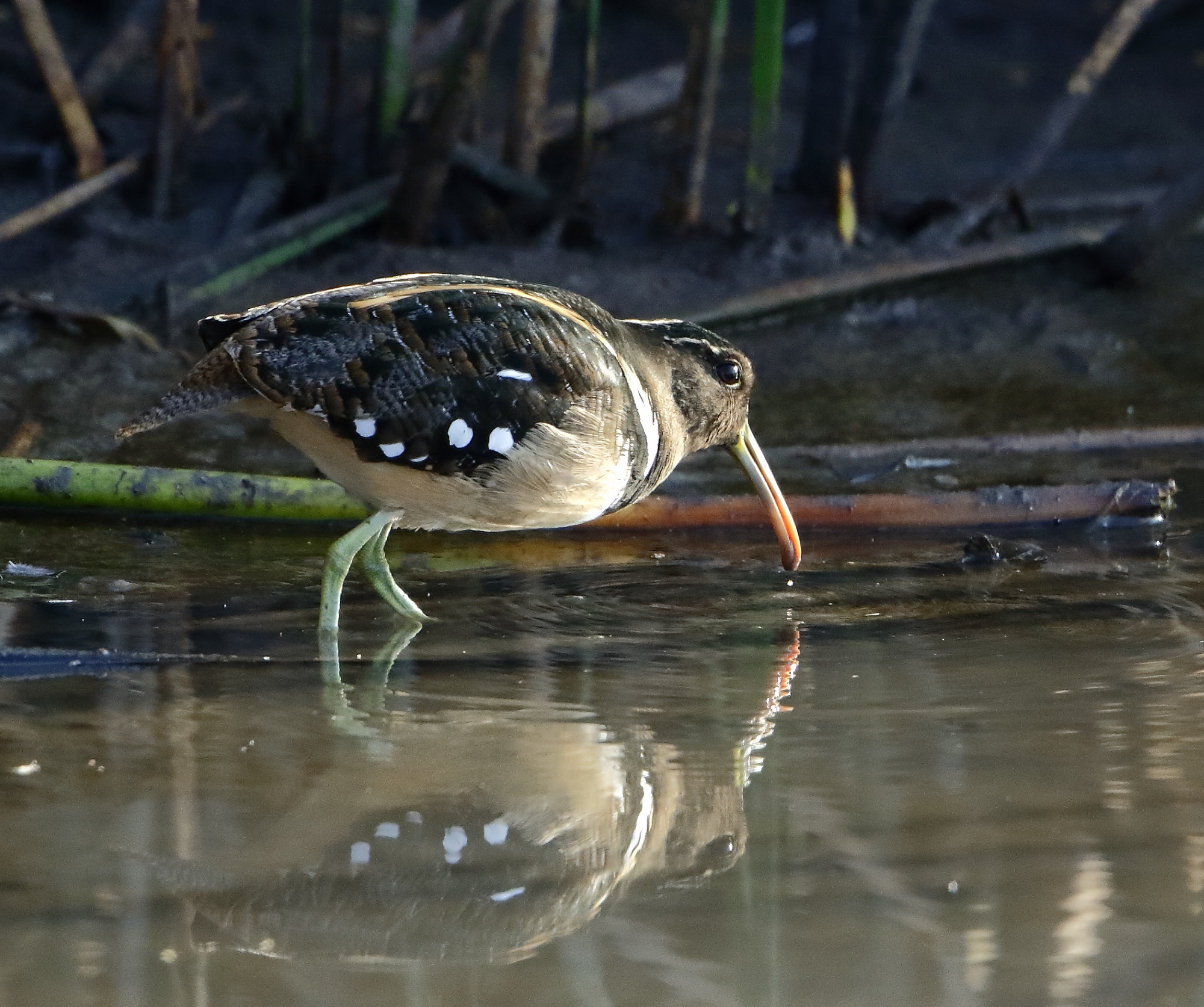

Conservation status
- Near Threatened (IUCN 3.1)

Scientific classification
- Kingdom: Animalia
- Phylum: Chordata
- Class: Aves
- Order: Charadriiformes
- Family: Rostratulidae
- Genus: Nycticryphes; Wetmore & Peters, 1923
- Species: N. semicollaris

Binomial name
- Nycticryphes semicollaris (Vieillot, 1816)

Synonyms
- Totanus semi-collaris (protonym); Rostratula semicollaris

= South American painted-snipe =

Species of bird

The South American painted-snipe (Nycticryphes semicollaris), or lesser painted-snipe, is a shorebird in the family Rostratulidae. There are two other species in its family, the Australian painted-snipe and the greater painted-snipe.

== Description ==
Head and neck dark red-brown with a yellow stripe on the crown; upperparts dark grey-brown, spotted white; underparts white. Although the female may be slightly larger and brighter, in contrast to the two other species in the family, the South American painted-snipe is not strongly sexually dimorphic. It has a relatively long, decurved, bill. It has webbed feet, also a difference from the other painted snipe. Measurements: 19–23 cm in length; 65–86 g in weight.

=== Vocalizations ===
A hoarse, hissing "wee-oo" has been recorded from birds in captivity.

== Distribution and habitat ==
The species is found in the southern third of South America, from southern Brazil, Paraguay and Uruguay to Chile and Argentina. It inhabits lowland freshwater wetlands, including wet grasslands.

== Behaviour and ecology ==
=== Breeding ===
South American painted-snipes are monogamous and breed semi-colonially. The nest is a shallow cup on the ground in a wetland, with a clutch of 2-3 eggs. Breeding has been recorded mainly from July to February.

=== Feeding ===
The South American painted-snipe is omnivorous, feeding by probing in mud and shallow water for small animals and seeds, often at dusk.

== Status ==
The South American painted-snipe has traditionally been regarded as a desirable game-bird in Chile and Argentina and has been regularly hunted. It is an uncommon species in its wide range, and may be threatened by drainage of wetlands and other habitat degradation. However, there has been no documented significant decline in population and the species' conservation status remains at one of Least Concern.
