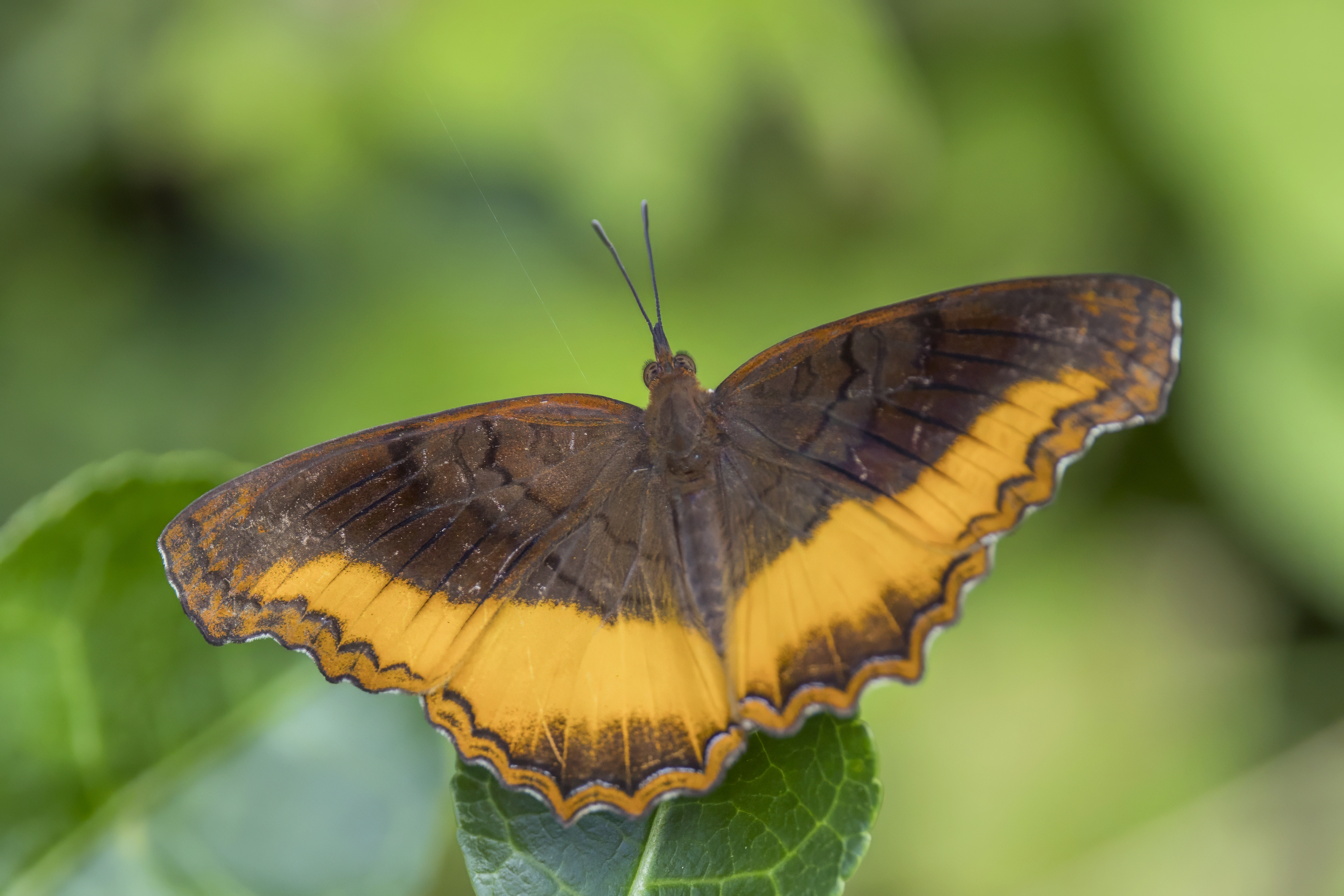
- E. d. angulata Maputo National Park, Mozambique
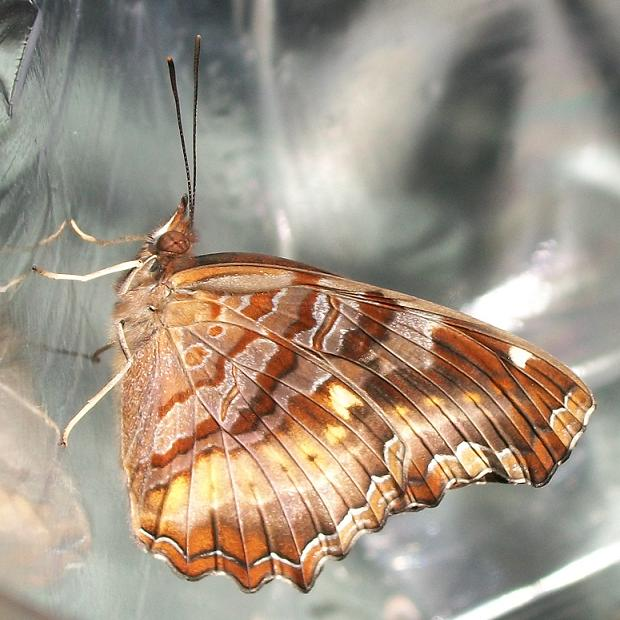
- Side patterning

Scientific classification
- Kingdom: Animalia
- Phylum: Arthropoda
- Clade: Pancrustacea
- Class: Insecta
- Order: Lepidoptera
- Family: Nymphalidae
- Genus: Eurytela
- Species: E. dryope

Binomial name
- Eurytela dryope (Cramer, [1775])

Synonyms
- Papilio dryope Cramer, [1775]; Eurytela dryope var. angulata Aurivillius, 1899; Eurytela dryope var. lineata Aurivillius, 1899

= Eurytela dryope =

Golden piper

Species of butterfly

Eurytela dryope, the golden piper, is a butterfly of the family Nymphalidae, found in Sub-Saharan Africa, the Arabian Peninsula and Madagascar.

== Description ==
Wingspan: 40–50 mm in males and 45–55 mm in females. The male and female are very similar in appearance. The upperside of the wings is dark brown with a wide, yellow-orange band in the lower two-thirds of the forewing margin and the outer half of the hindwing. The underside of the wings is variegated in shades of brown.

== Subspecies ==
Listed alphabetically:

- E. d. angulata Aurivillius, 1898 – eastern and southern Democratic Republic of the Congo, Angola, Uganda, Ethiopia, Kenya, Tanzania, Malawi, Zambia, Mozambique, Zimbabwe, Botswana, Eswatini, South Africa: Limpopo, Mpumalanga, North West, Gauteng, KwaZulu-Natal and Eastern Cape
- E. d. brittoni Gabriel, 1954 – south-western Saudi Arabia, Yemen
- E. d. dryope (Cramer, [1775]) – Guinea, Sierra Leone, Liberia, Ivory Coast, Ghana, Togo, Benin, southern Nigeria, Cameroon, central and northern Democratic Republic of the Congo
- E. d. lineata Aurivillius, 1898 – Madagascar, Comoros

Torben Larsen developed a species numbering system for his 2005 publication Butterflies of West Africa. The nominate subspecies is #834. The 'Larsen' numbers have since been used with permission in A Sharp Eye on Butterflies of Ghana.

== Distribution ==
E. d. angulata is found in Ethiopia, East Africa, southern DRC, Angola and on the eastern side of South Africa from Limpopo, the Magaliesberg, Mpumalanga, Eswatini, KwaZulu-Natal, to Port St Johns in the Eastern Cape. A photographic record was made further south than Port St Johns during the South African Butterfly Conservation Assessment. E. d. brittoni is found in the south-west of the Arabian Peninsula. E. d. dryope from Sierra Leone to Cameroon and northern DRC. E. d. lineata is found in Madagascar.

== Life cycle ==
=== Eggs ===
The eggs are covered in longitudinal rows of hairy spines.

=== Larvae ===
The larvae are spiny with large head processes and feed on Tragia glabrata, Dalechampia capensis, and Ricinus communis.

=== Pupae ===
The pupae are greenish in colour and have greatly expanded wing cases.

=== Adults ===
The flight period is year round, peaking between November and June. They have a leisurely, gliding flight, settling frequently, usually with open wings. The adults feed on fermenting fruit, tree sap and nectar. They are found in forests and wooded, frost-free savanna. This species can tolerate drier conditions than the pied piper (Eurytela hiarbas).

== Gallery ==
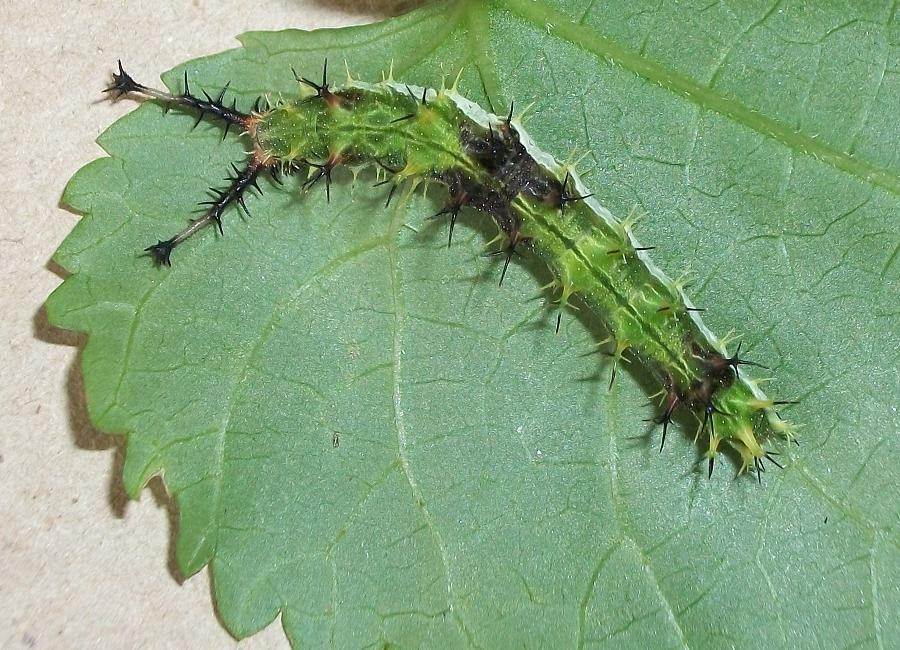
Captive-raised E. d. angulata larva (green)

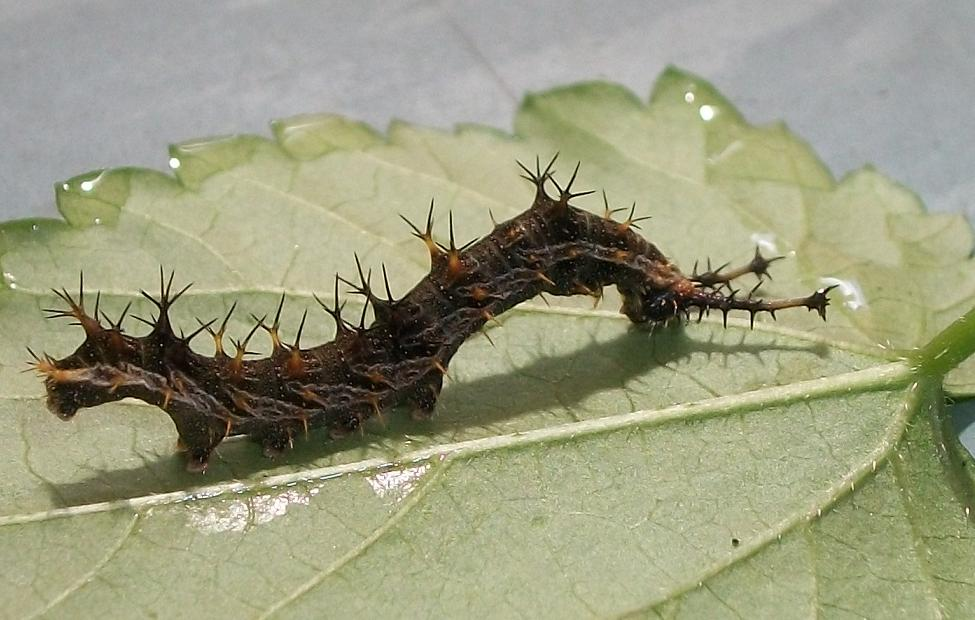
Captive-raised E. d. angulata larva (dark)

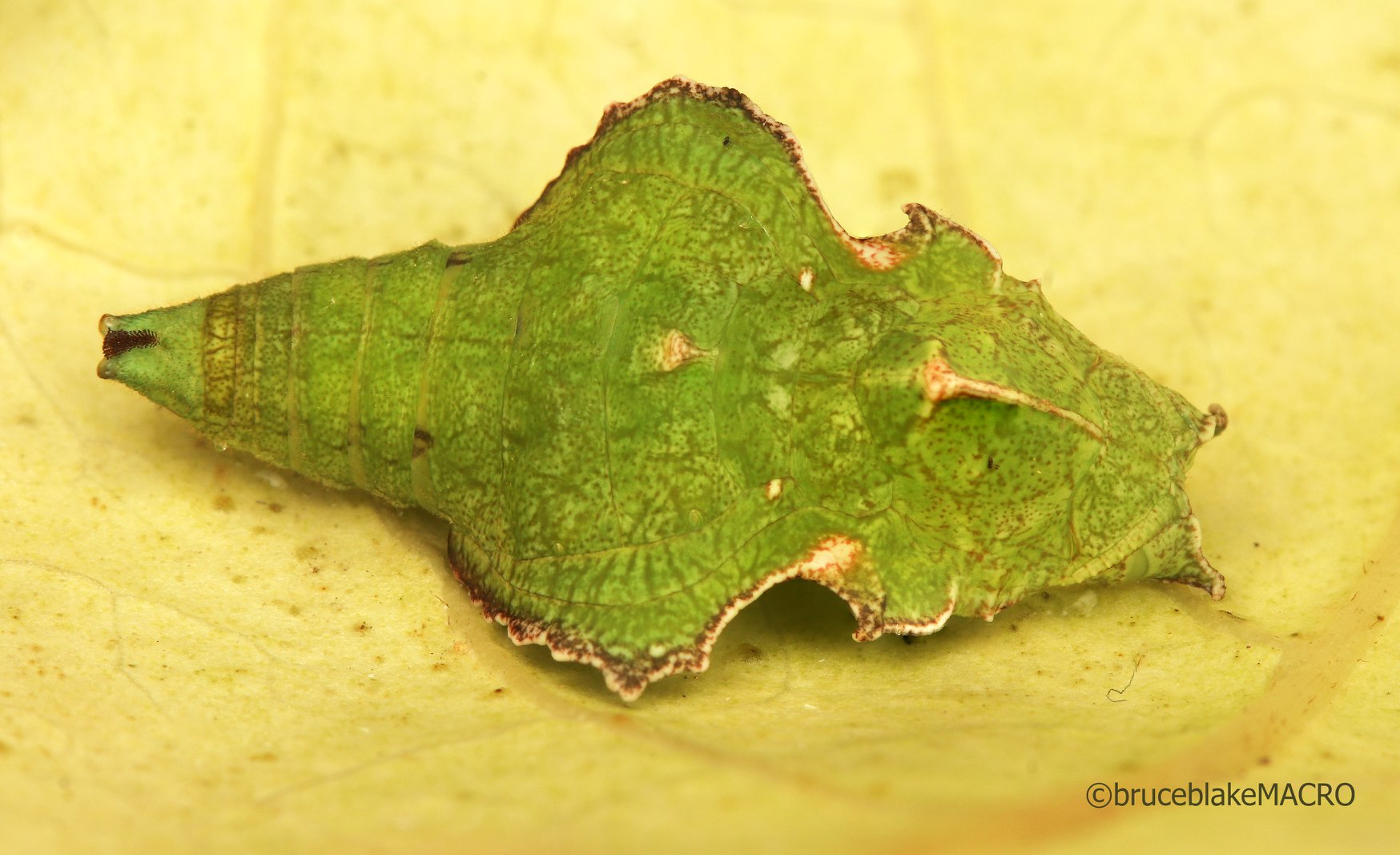
Pupa of a captive-raised E. d. angulata

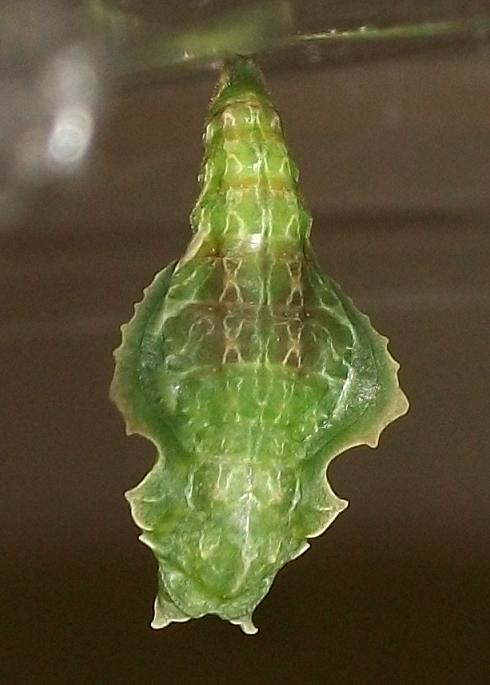
Pupa of a captive-raised E. d. angulata

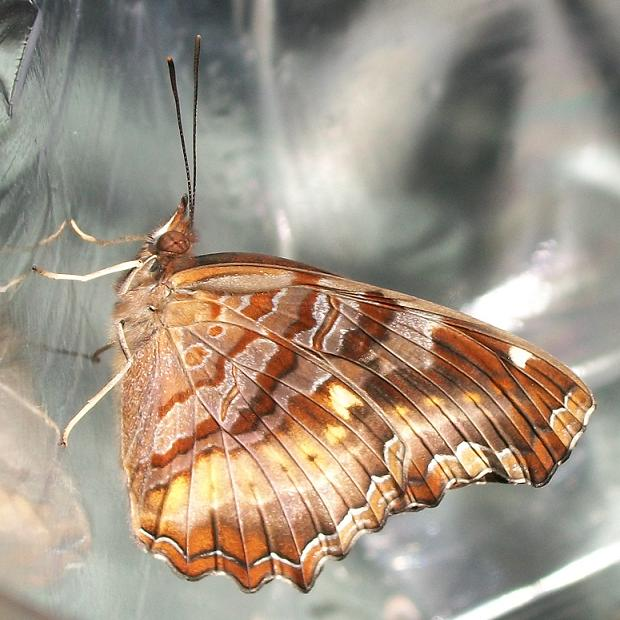
Captive-raised E. d. angulata
