= Byblia anvatara =

- Male B. a. acheloia, Tanzania

Scientific classification
- Kingdom: Animalia
- Phylum: Arthropoda
- Clade: Pancrustacea
- Class: Insecta
- Order: Lepidoptera
- Family: Nymphalidae
- Genus: Byblia
- Species: B. anvatara

Binomial name
- Byblia anvatara (Boisduval, 1833)

Synonyms
- Hypanis vulgaris Staudinger, 1886; Byblia anvatara anvatara f. seriata Rothschild and Jordan, 1903; Hypanis acheloia Wallengren, 1857; Hypanis castanea Butler, 1886; Hypanis ilithyia var. vulgaris Staudinger, 1886; Byblia acheloia vulgaris ab. albitrimacula Strand, 1911; Byblia acheloia ab. holobrunnea Vári, 1976; Byblia acheloia acheloia f. similata van Son, 1979; Byblia boydi Dixey, 1898; Byblia ilithyia var. crameri Aurivillius, 1894; Byblia anvatara crameri f. fasciata Rothschild and Jordan, 1903; Byblia acheloia ab. infuscata Schultze, 1920; Byblia acheloia crameri f. nigrifusa Joicey and Talbot, 1921; Byblia acheloia f. greenawayi Stoneham, 1965

Species of butterfly

Byblia anvatara, the common joker, is a butterfly of the family Nymphalidae, found in Sub-Saharan Africa.

Wingspan: 38–43 mm in males and 40–45 mm in females. Its flight period is year round.

Larvae feed on Tragia glabrata and Dalechampia capensis.

== Subspecies ==
Listed alphabetically:

- Byblia anvatara acheloia (Wallengren, 1857) – Yemen, south-western Saudi Arabia, Sudan, Ethiopia, Somalia, Kenya, eastern Tanzania, Zambia, Mozambique, Zimbabwe, Botswana, northern Namibia, Eswatini, South Africa: Limpopo, Mpumalanga, North West, KwaZulu-Natal, Eastern Cape
- Byblia anvatara anvatara (Boisduval, 1833) – Madagascar, Comoros
- Byblia anvatara boydi Dixey, 1898 – Socotra
- Byblia anvatara crameri Aurivillius, 1894 – eastern Senegal, Gambia, Guinea-Bissau, Burkina Faso, Guinea, Sierra Leone, Liberia, Ivory Coast, Ghana, Togo, Benin, Nigeria: south and the Cross River loop, Cameroon to Angola, Democratic Republic of the Congo, Uganda, Tanzania: north-west to the Kagera Region

Torben Larsen developed a species numbering system for his 2005 publication Butterflies of West Africa. The subspecies crameri is #. The 'Larsen' numbers have since been used with permission in A Sharp Eye on Butterflies of Ghana.
