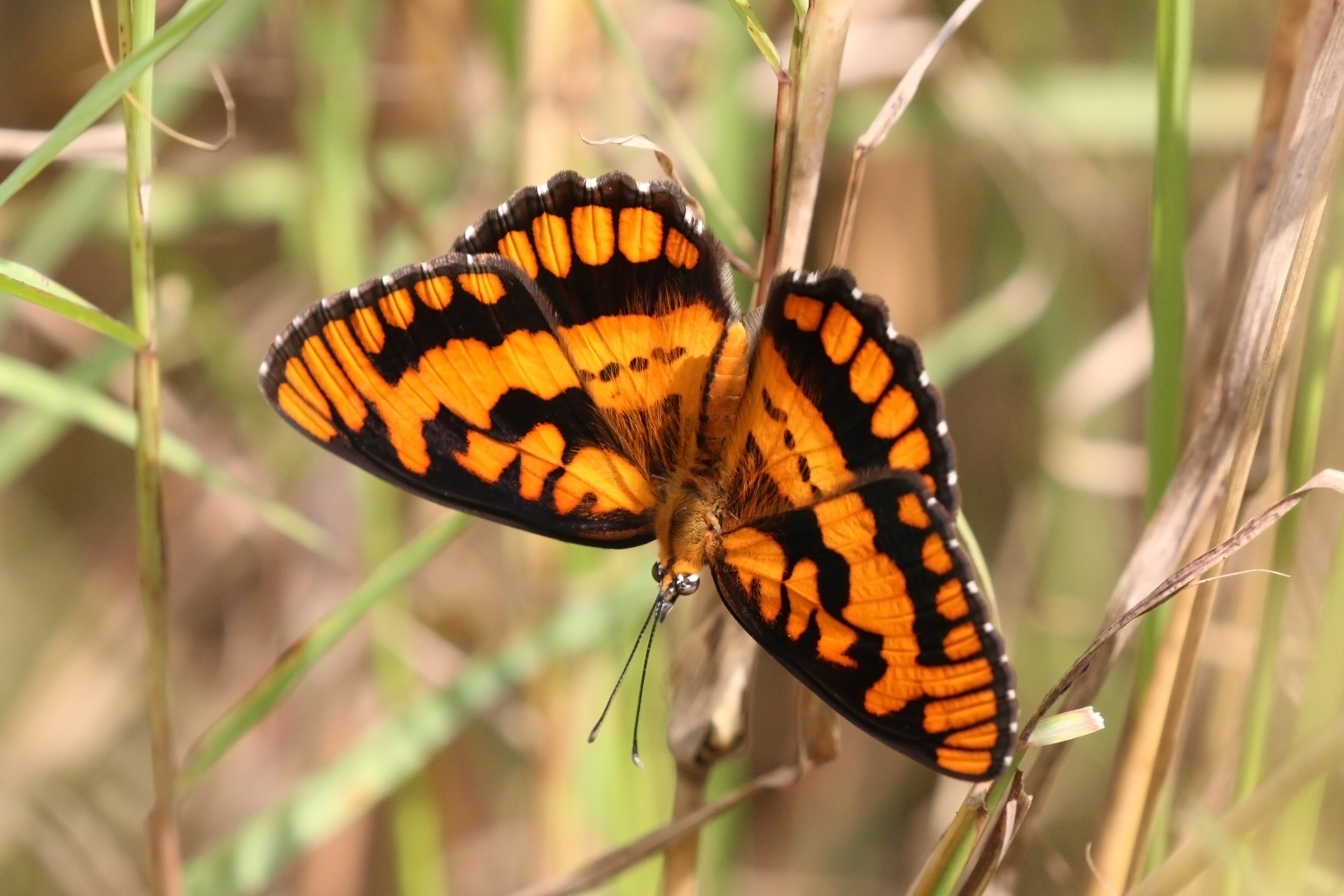
- Male; Semliki Wildlife Reserve, Uganda
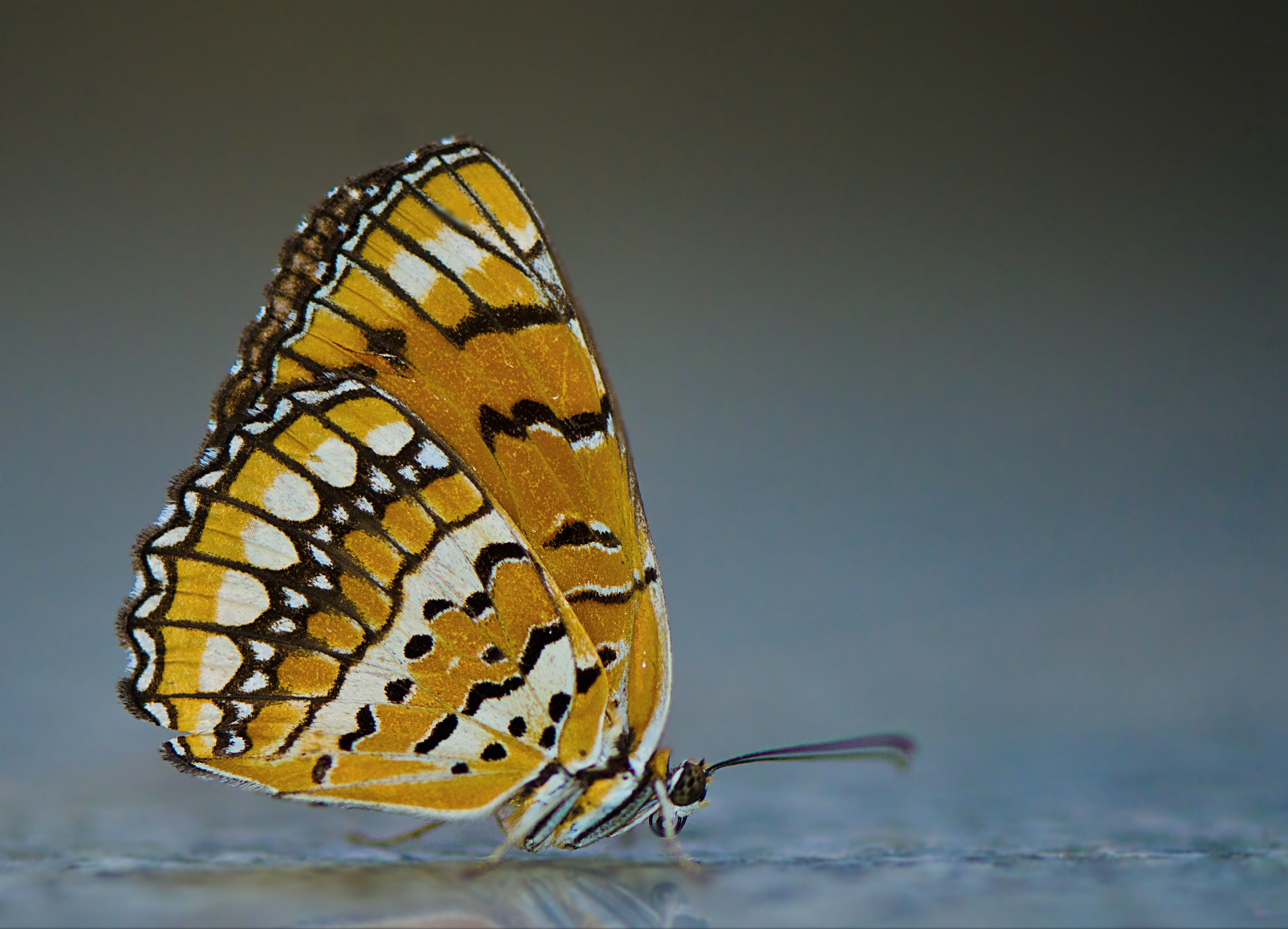
- In Bangalore, India

Scientific classification
- Kingdom: Animalia
- Phylum: Arthropoda
- Clade: Pancrustacea
- Class: Insecta
- Order: Lepidoptera
- Family: Nymphalidae
- Genus: Byblia
- Species: B. ilithyia

Binomial name
- Byblia ilithyia (Drury, 1773)

Synonyms
- Papilio ilithyia Drury, 1773; Papilio polinice Stoll, 1782; Papilio gotzius Herbst, 1798; Hypanis cora Feisthamel, 1850; Byblia ilithyia var. badiata Grünberg, 1910; Byblia ilithyia f. aestivalis Ungemach, 1932

= Byblia ilithyia =

Spotted joker

Species of butterfly

Byblia ilithyia, the spotted joker or joker, is a species of nymphalid butterfly found in parts of Africa and Asia.

== Description ==
=== Wet-season form in Asia ===
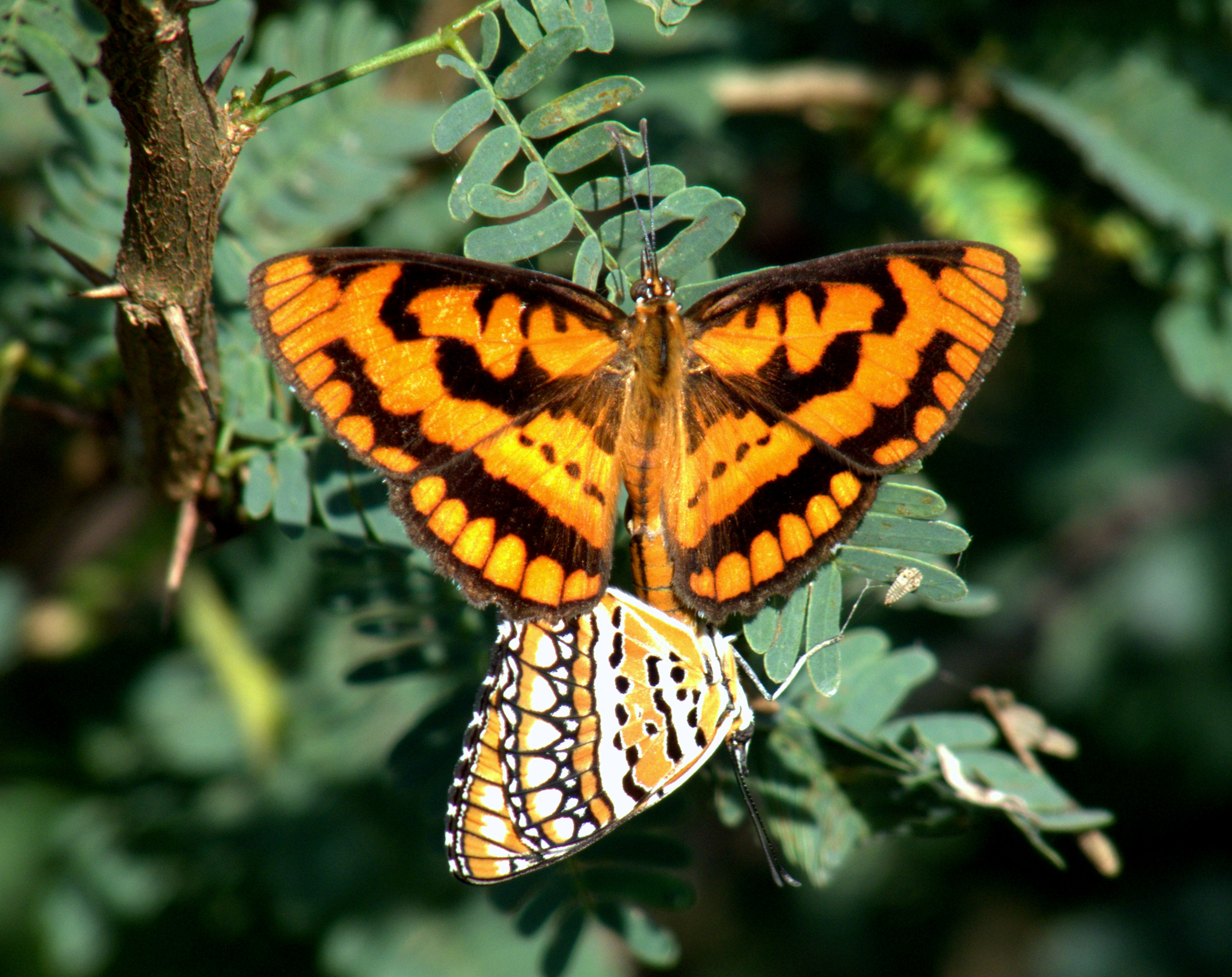
Mating pair at Singanallur Lake, Coimbatore, Tamil Nadu, India

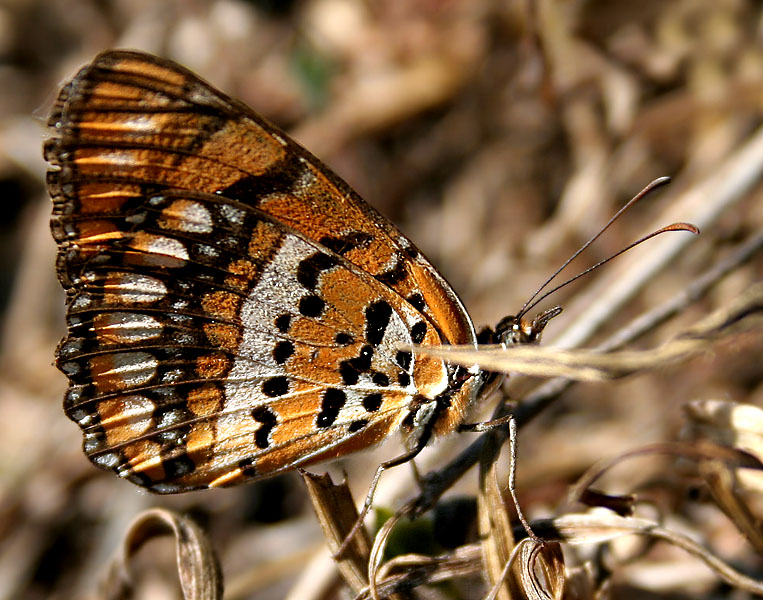
Wet-season form in Manjira Wildlife Sanctuary, Andhra Pradesh, India

The male has the upperwings of a deep rich orange. The forewing has the costa broadly black until nearly the apex. The cell has three narrow short black bands, the inner and outer not reaching the median vein. An irregular black spot from dorsum to vein 4, continues very narrowly along that vein to meet an oblique irregular band from just beyond the middle of the costa. A postdiscal broad transverse black band from dorsum to vein 4, with the portions of the veins beyond it defined in black. The apex of the wing beyond the broad black edging to the costal border has its upper margin and the terminal portions of the veins defined in black; finally a narrow terminal band. The hindwing has an elongate black sub-costal patch near base, continued posteriorly across the cell by an inner and an outer series of small transverse spots; a complete broad black postdiscal band with the portions of the veins beyond it lined with black, and a narrow black terminal band as on the forewing. Cilia of forewings and hindwings white, alternated with brown.

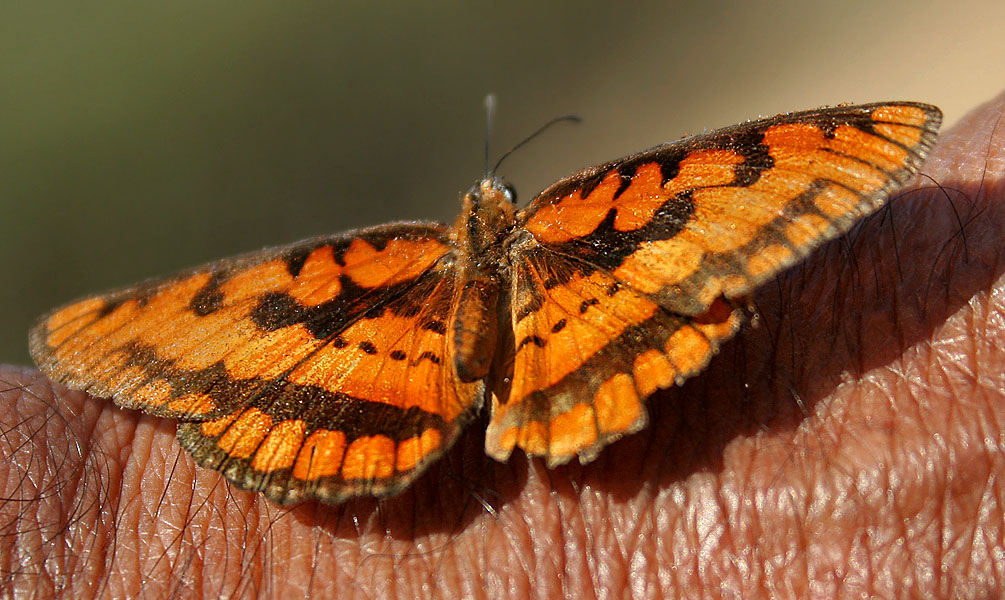
Wet-season form in Manjira Wildlife Sanctuary, Andhra Pradesh, India

Underside paler duller orange. Forewing: black markings as on the upperside, but the cell and upper discal markings obscurely margined on the inner side by white; an oblique black line from costa to apex of post-discal transverse band, followed by an oblique pre-apical series of diffuse white spots, the terminal black band as on the upperside but traversed by a broken white line. Hindwing: a sub-basal and a discal broad, transverse white band, both bordered inwardly by a series of black spots, and outwardly by a broad black line; a somewhat narrower postdiscal transverse black band traversed by a series of paired white spots, followed by a row of cone-shaped markings of the ground colour, the apices of the cones turned inwards and broadly white; finally, a black terminal band traversed by a series of white lunules. Antennae black; head, thorax and abdomen dark dusky fulvous red; beneath, palpi white, head, thorax and abdomen dark ochraceous, variegated with some black and white lines and spots.

Female similar, with similar markings, but on the upperside the ground colour is paler, the black markings narrower. Forewing: the postdiscal black band nearly complete, interrupted only in interspaces 1 and 4; the terminal black band traversed by a broken white line. Hindwing: no subcostal black patch, instead three series of transverse spots; a postdiscal transverse broad black band bordered inwardly by a series of slender black loops, between these and the postdiscal band a series of spots of the ground colour; the terminal black band traversed as on the forewing by a whitish broken line. Underside similar to that in the male, but the ground colour paler. On the forewing the black markings comparatively narrower, less well-defined; on the hindwing the white on the bands and spots replaced by pale yellow.

=== Dry-season form ===
Males and females are similar to the wet-season form but the black markings are not so sharply defined. Underside: ground colour darker, on the hindwing a dark ochraceous; the transverse subbasal and discal bands in both sexes white.

Wingspan: 50–56 mm.

The haploid chromosome number is 17.

== Distribution ==
Parts of Africa, central and southern India, and Sri Lanka.

== Host plants ==
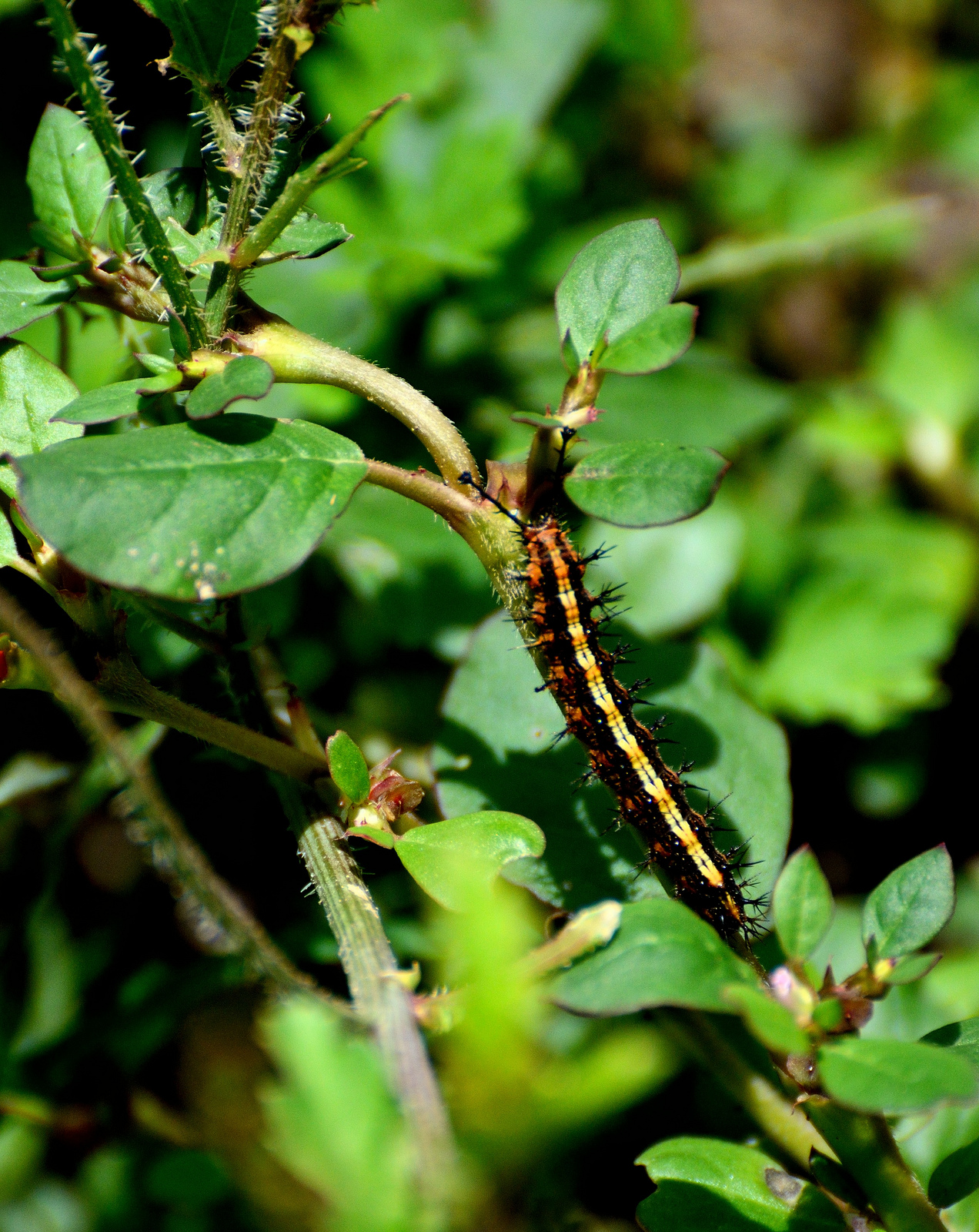
Caterpillar of the spotted joker

The larvae feed on Tragia involucrata, Tragia plukenetii, Tragia dubanensis, Tragia glabrata, Dalechampia capensis, and Tragia cannabina.
