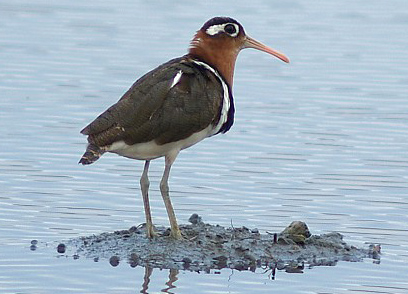
- Female greater painted-snipe

Scientific classification
- Kingdom: Animalia
- Phylum: Chordata
- Class: Aves
- Order: Charadriiformes
- Suborder: Scolopaci
- Family: Rostratulidae; Coues, 1888

Genera
- Rostratula; Nycticryphes

= Painted-snipe =

Painted-snipes Temporal range: Early Pliocene to present

Family of birds

The Rostratulidae, commonly known as the painted-snipes, are a family of wading birds that consists of two genera: Rostratula and Nycticryphes.

== Description ==
The painted-snipes are short-legged, long-billed birds similar in shape to the true snipes, but their plumage is much more striking. There is sexual dimorphism in both size and plumage, with the males being duller overall and smaller. All three species have large forward pointing eyes.

== Phylogenetics ==
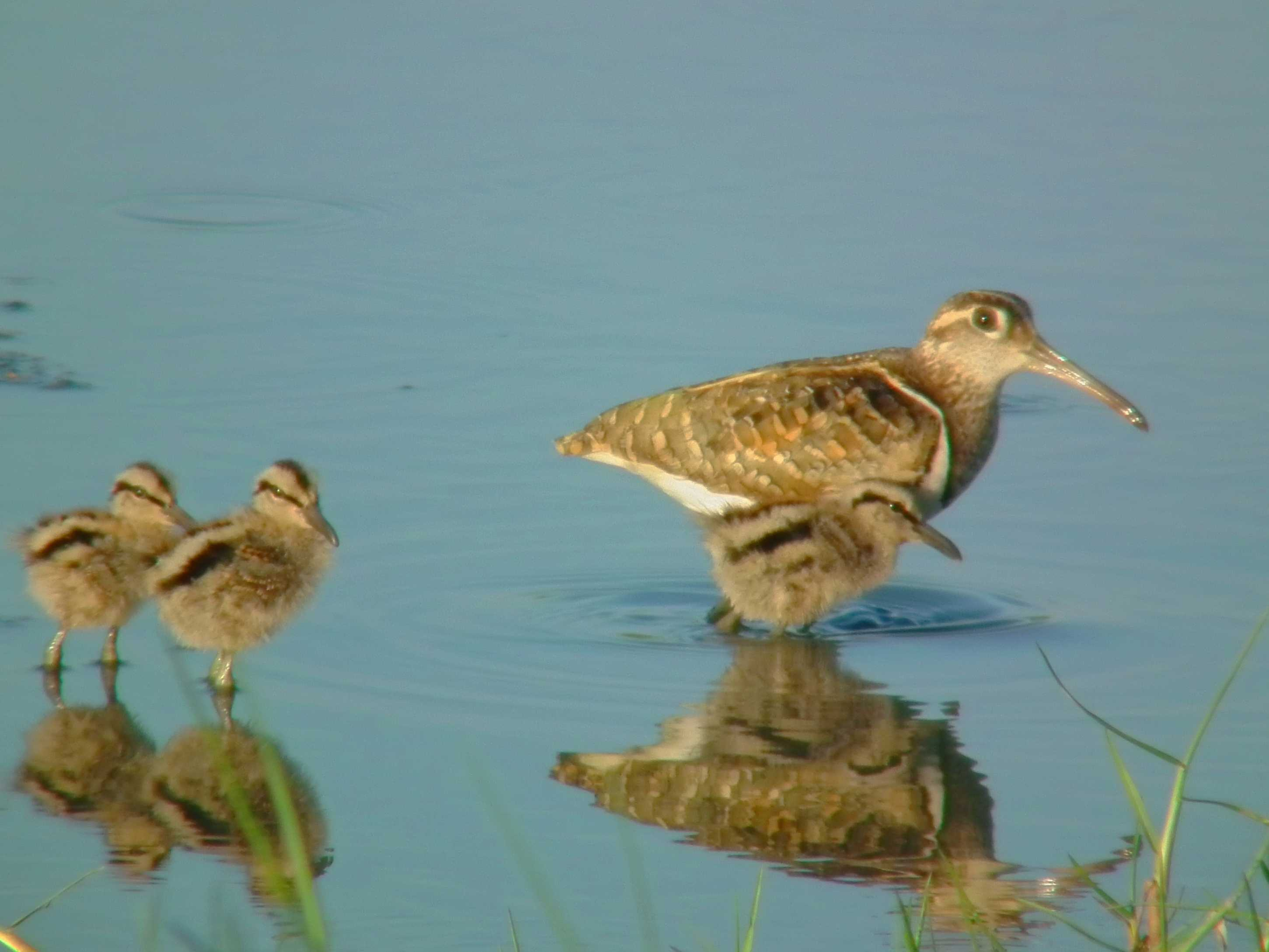
Rostratula benghalensis with chicks

The family Rostratulidae encompasses two genera and four species, one of which is extinct. Painted-snipes superficially resemble true snipes, but the two taxa are not closely related. Instead the similarity can be attributed to convergent evolution where both groups have been subjected to similar selective pressures, thus promoting the evolution of analogous features such as a long slender bill and legs, mottled cryptic plumage and characteristic body proportions. While less similar in general morphology, the species that are most closely related to painted-snipes are other members of the suborder Thinocori: jacanas, seedsnipes, and the plains wanderer.

The species †Rostratula minator was described in 1988 from deposits of the early Pliocene found in Langebaanweg, South Africa. This is the first fossil attributed to the family Rostratulidae. Comparisons of bone measurements with R. minator and the extant species show that it was intermediate in size, although considerable differences indicate that it may only be an endemic African species that has become extinct, rather than a direct ancestor of R. benghalensis.

The Australian painted-snipe was described as Rostratula australis by John Gould in 1838, although later lumped with the similar greater painted-snipe, R. benghalensis as subspecies R. b. australis. However, morphological and genetic differences have resulted in the species being restored in recent years. Such a similarity between the two species can be explained by a recent evolutionary divergence, and is an example of allopatric speciation where the prevention of gene flow by geographical isolation has resulted in an accumulation of differences by genetic drift and differing selective pressures.

== Taxonomy ==
Family Rostratulidae: painted-snipes

Image	Genus	Species
	Rostratula Vieillot, 1816	Rostratula benghalensis, greater painted-snipe – Found in marshes in Africa, India and South-east Asia.; Rostratula australis, Australian painted-snipe – Rare, nomadic and declining species found only in Australia.; †Rostratula minator – Extinct species described from Pliocene deposits in South Africa.
	Nycticryphes Wetmore & Peters, 1923	Nycticryphes semicollaris, South American painted-snipe – Inhabits grassy marshland in southern South America.

== Behaviour ==
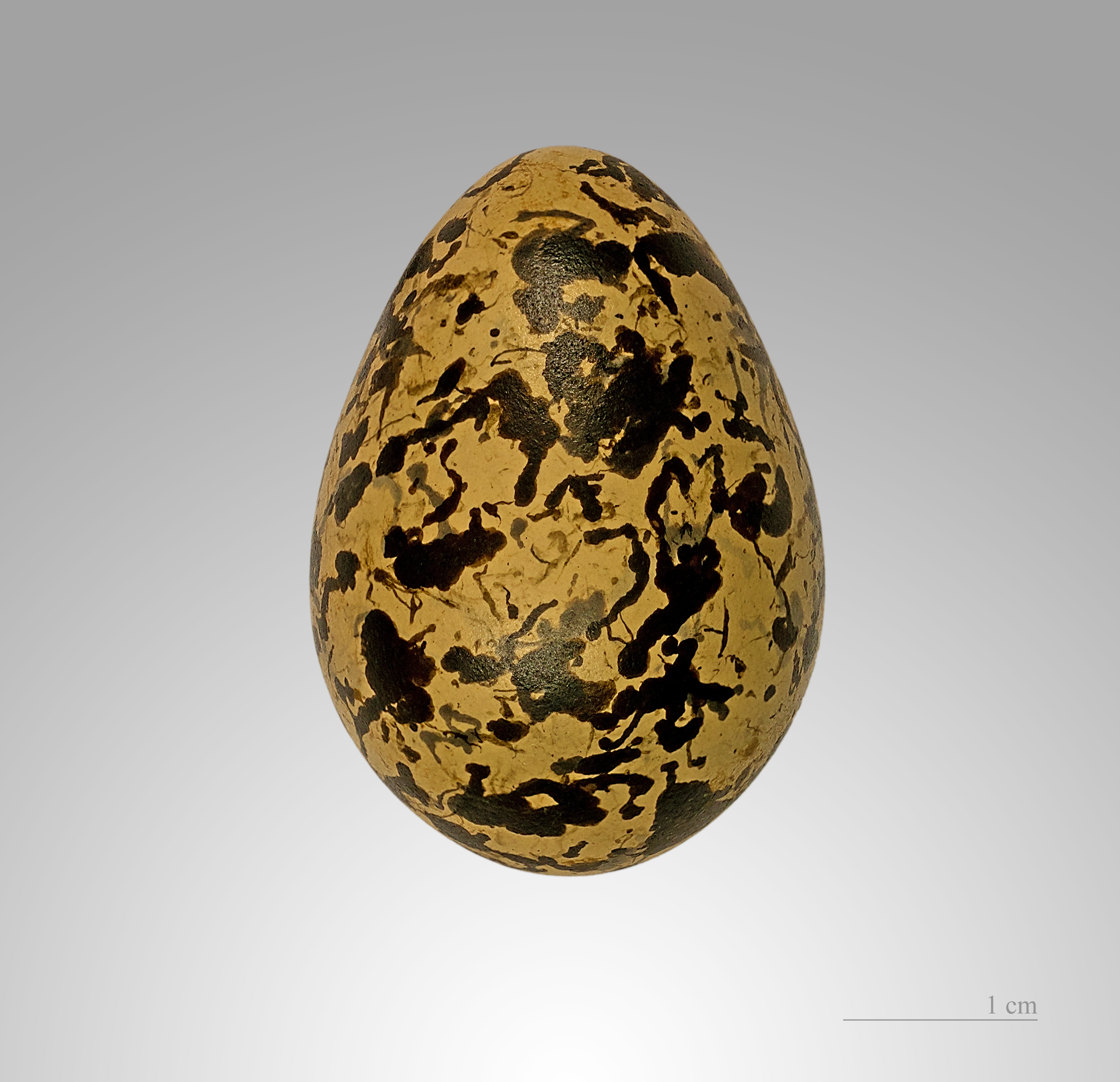
Rostratula benghalensis egg

All three species of painted-snipe generally inhabit reedy swamps and marshes, usually in lowlands. Outside of the breeding season painted-snipes are generally solitary in habits. Painted snipes are crepuscular or even slightly nocturnal in their habits.

=== Feeding ===
Painted-snipes are omnivorous, feeding on invertebrates and seeds. Animal prey taken includes annelid worms, snails, aquatic and marsh insects, and crustaceans. The seeds of grasses such as millet and rice are also consumed, and may form a major part of the diet of some populations.

=== Breeding ===
The breeding biology of the painted-snipes varies according to genus; the Rostratula painted-snipes are generally polyandrous whereas the South American painted-snipe is monogamous. The females of the genus Rostratula will bond with several males during a breeding season, but once the eggs are laid the males provide all the incubation and parental care. The nest of both species is a shallow cup, often built on a platform of vegetation. Clutch sizes range from 2–4 eggs, which are incubated for 15–21 days.

== Conservation ==
At present, two species, the South American and greater painted-snipes, are not considered threatened by human activities; however, the Australian painted-snipe has declined and is considered endangered in Australia.
