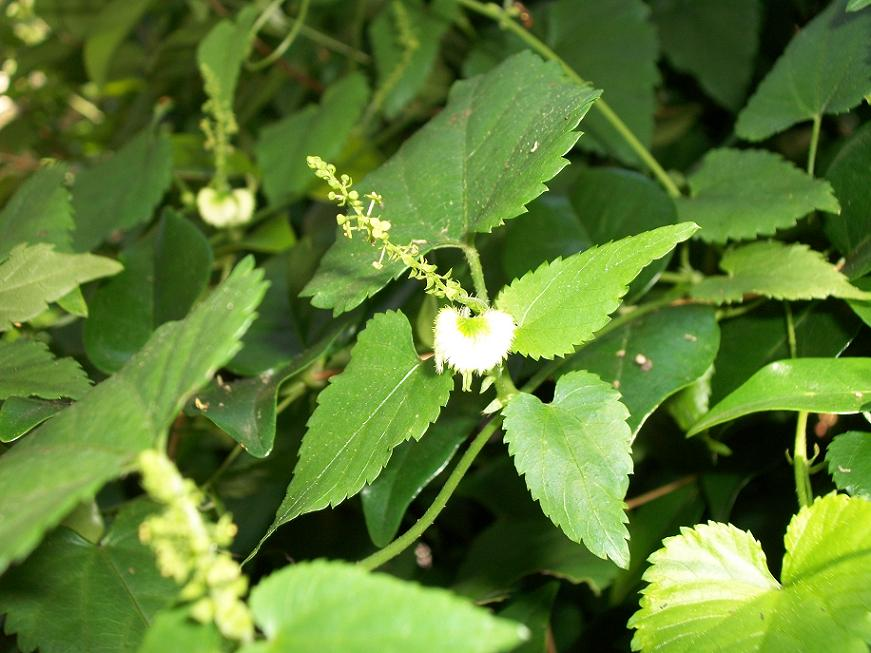

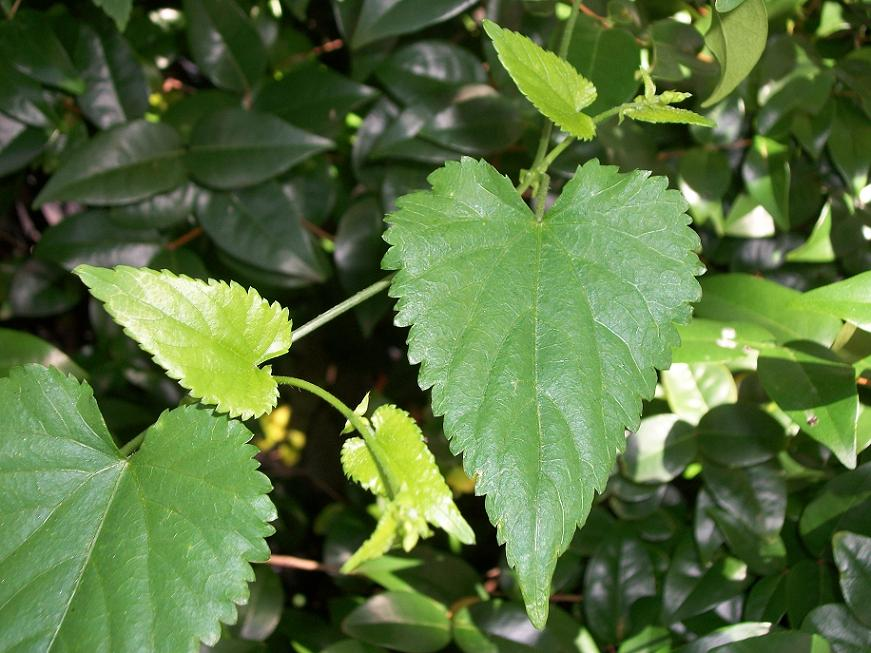
- T. durbanensis from Athlone Park, Amanzimtoti, South Africa

Scientific classification
- Kingdom: Plantae
- Clade: Tracheophytes
- Clade: Angiosperms
- Clade: Eudicots
- Clade: Rosids
- Order: Malpighiales
- Family: Euphorbiaceae
- Genus: Tragia
- Species: T. durbanensis

Binomial name
- Tragia durbanensis Kuntze

Synonyms
- See text

= Tragia durbanensis =

Stinging nettle creeper

Species of creeper

Tragia durbanensis, the stinging nettle creeper, is a twining herb in the family Euphorbiaceae, with a restricted distribution in southern Africa.

== Distribution and habitat ==
It is native to the coastal areas of Mozambique and eastern coastal areas of South Africa. These plants are found in dune forest, in woodland and on forest margins.

== Description ==
A much-branched climbing perennial herb, with twining stems up to 2.5 m originating from a woody rootstock. The leaves are hairless or thinly hairy with serrated margins. The hairs sting fiercely. Inflorescences are up to 5.5 cm long with peduncles up to 2 cm long. The inflorescences are composed mostly of tiny male flowers with 1–2 female flowers below or else all male.

== Synonyms ==
- Tragia capensis E.Mey. ex Sond. [Illegitimate name]
- Tragia glabrata (Müll.Arg.) Pax & K.Hoffm. [Illegitimate name]
- Tragia glabrata var. hispida Radcl.-Sm.
- Tragia meyeriana var. glabrata Müll.Arg.

== Ecological significance ==
This species is one of the larval foodplants of four species of butterfly; Eurytela hiarbas, Eurytela dryope, Byblia ilithyia and Byblia anvatara.

== Gallery ==
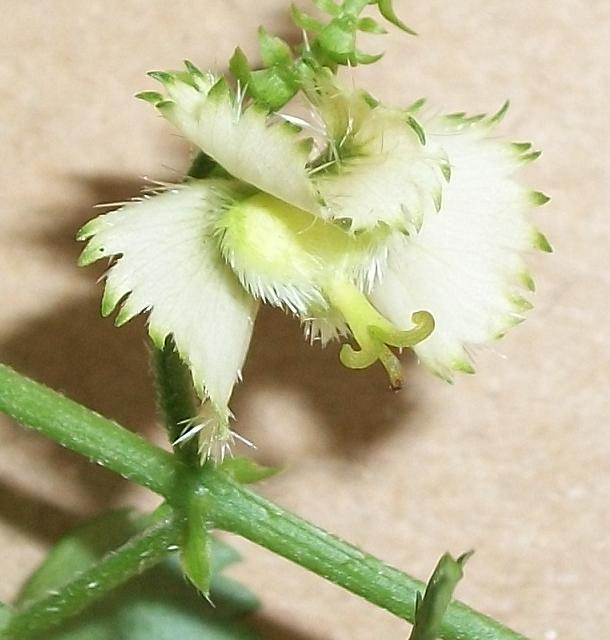
Female flower

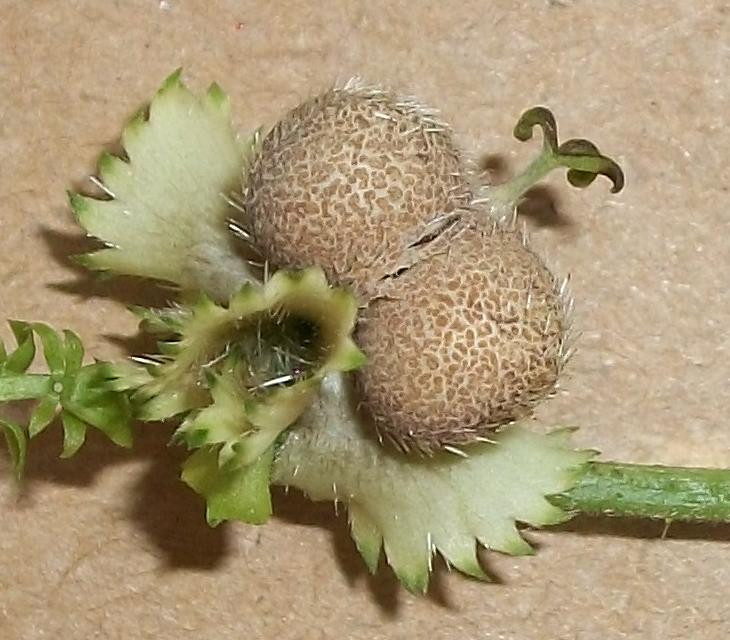
Fruit viewed from the side

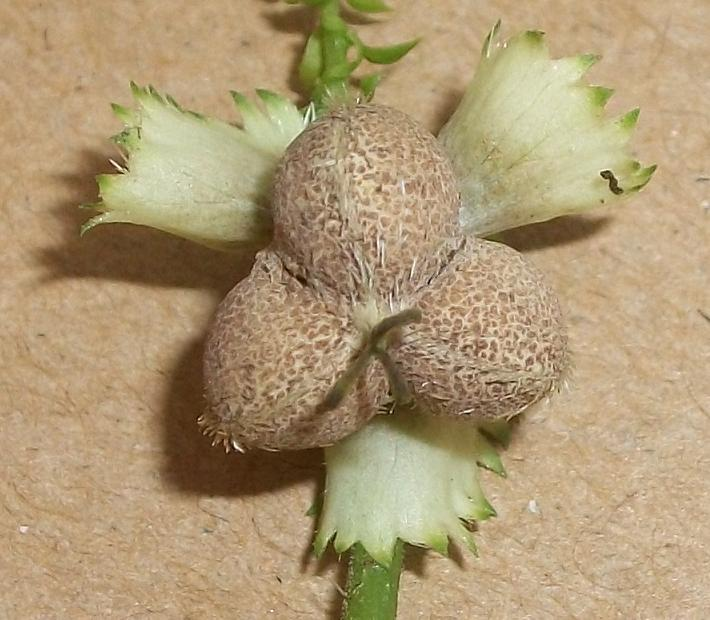
Fruit viewed from the front
