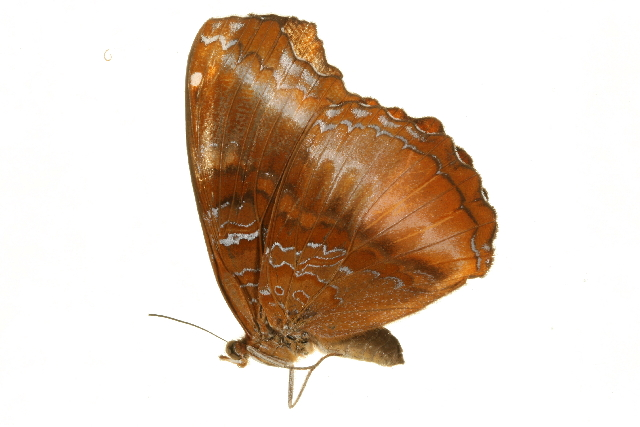

Scientific classification
- Kingdom: Animalia
- Phylum: Arthropoda
- Class: Insecta
- Order: Lepidoptera
- Family: Nymphalidae
- Genus: Eurytela
- Species: E. narinda

Binomial name
- Eurytela narinda Ward, 1872

= Eurytela narinda =

Species of butterfly

Eurytela narinda is a butterfly in the family Nymphalidae. It is found on Madagascar. The habitat consists of primary forests.
