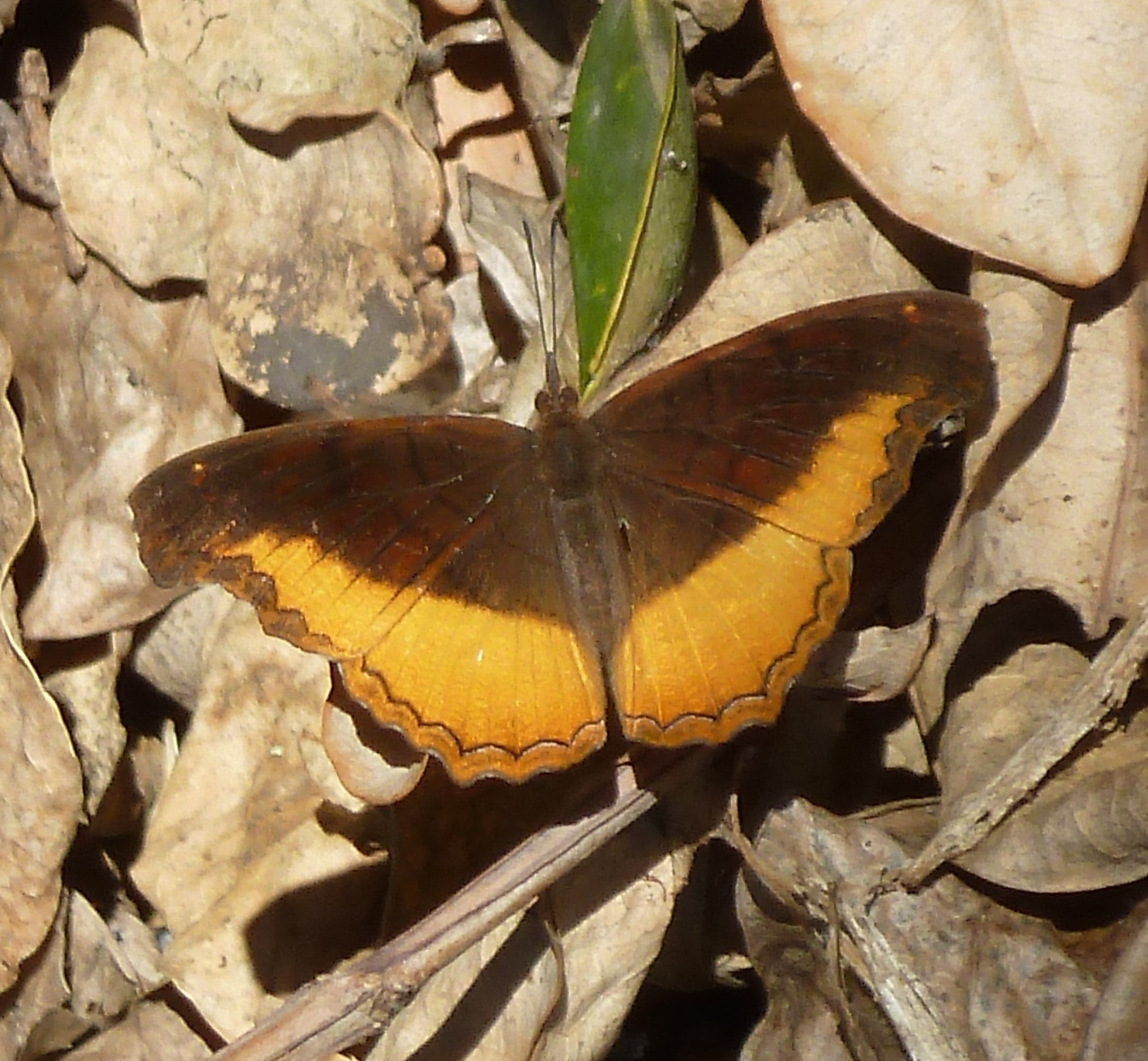
- Eurytela dryope

Scientific classification
- Domain: Eukaryota
- Kingdom: Animalia
- Phylum: Arthropoda
- Class: Insecta
- Order: Lepidoptera
- Family: Nymphalidae
- Tribe: Biblidini
- Genus: Eurytela; Boisduval, 1833

= Eurytela =

Genus of brush-footed butterflies

Eurytela is a genus of nymphalid butterfly, commonly called pipers, found in Africa.

== Species ==
Listed alphabetically:

- Eurytela alinda Mabille, 1893
- Eurytela dryope (Cramer, [1775]) – golden piper
- Eurytela hiarbas (Drury, 1770) – pied piper
- Eurytela narinda Ward, 1872
