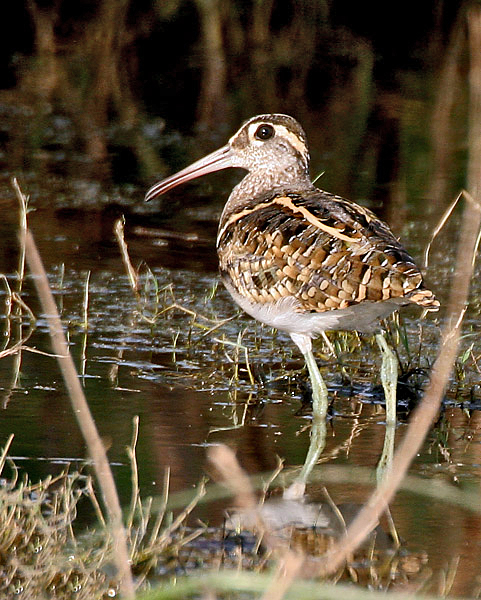
- Greater painted-snipe (Rostratula benghalensis)

Scientific classification
- Kingdom: Animalia
- Phylum: Chordata
- Class: Aves
- Order: Charadriiformes
- Family: Rostratulidae
- Genus: Rostratula; Vieillot, 1816

Type species
- Rostratula benghalensis

Species
- Rostratula benghalensis; Rostratula australis

= Rostratula =

Genus of birds

Rostratula is a genus of painted-snipes. It contains two extant species distributed across Africa, Asia and Australia.

== Species ==
=== Extant Species ===
Genus Rostratula – Vieillot, 1816 – two species
Common name	Scientific name and subspecies	Range	Size and ecology	IUCN status and estimated population
Greater painted-snipe	Rostratula benghalensis (Linnaeus, 1758)	marshes in Africa, India and South-east Asia.	Size: Habitat: Diet:	LC
Australian painted-snipe	Rostratula australis Lane & Rogers, 2000	rare, nomadic and declining species found only in Australia	Size: Habitat: Diet:	EN

=== Fossils ===
- †Rostratula minator is an extinct species, described from Pliocene deposits in South Africa.
