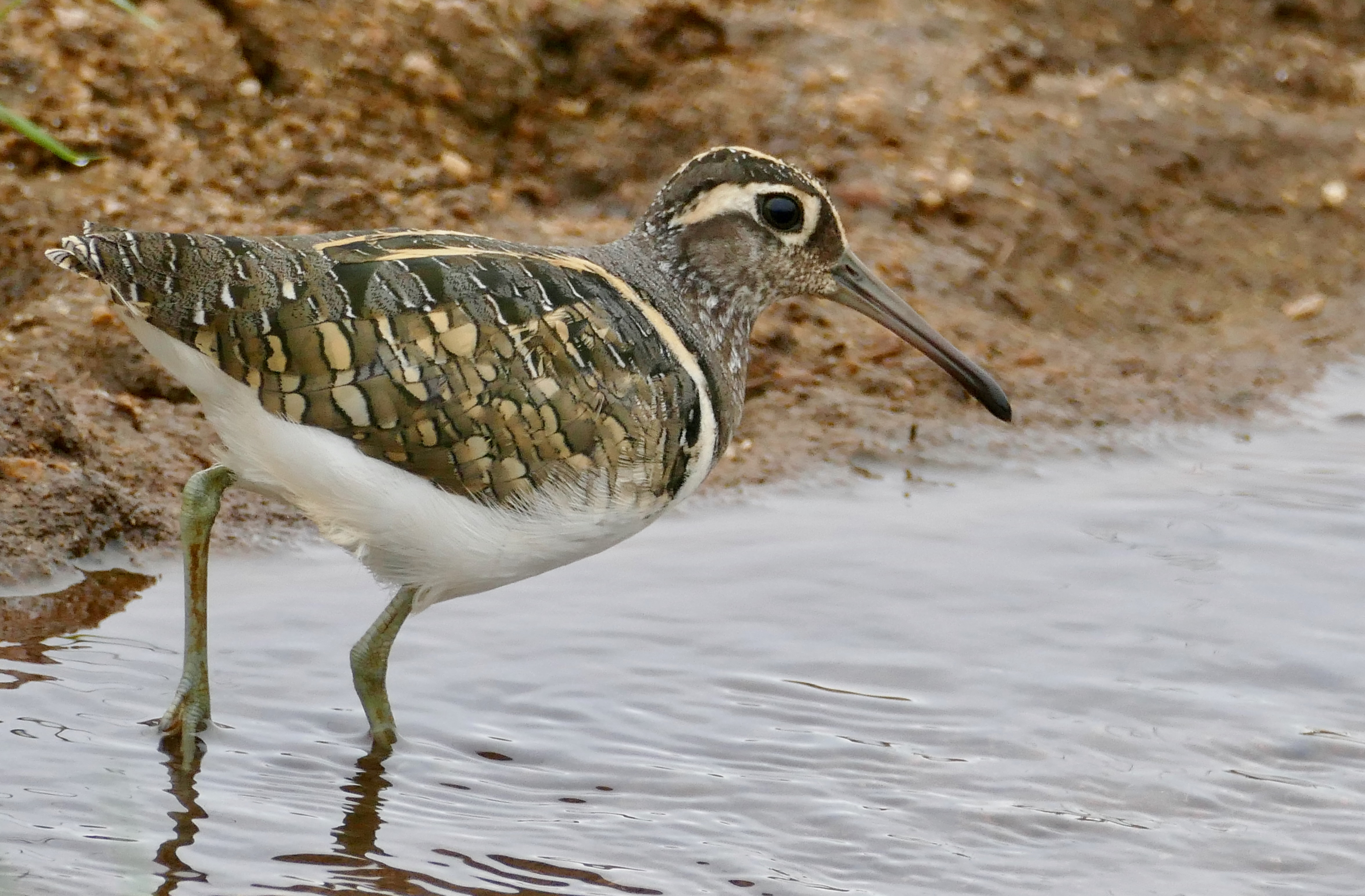
- Male above, female below
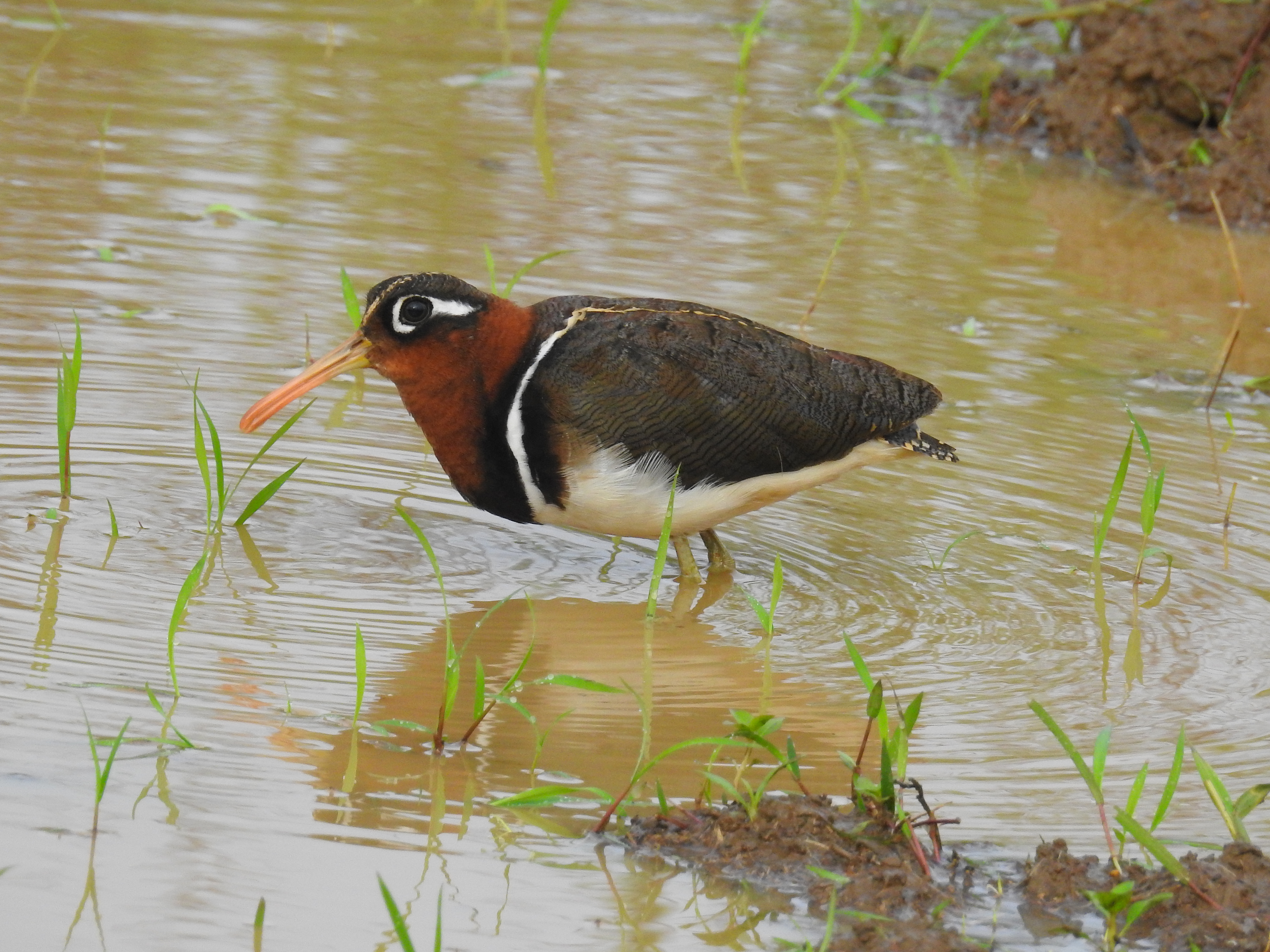

Conservation status
- Least Concern (IUCN 3.1)

Scientific classification
- Kingdom: Animalia
- Phylum: Chordata
- Class: Aves
- Order: Charadriiformes
- Family: Rostratulidae
- Genus: Rostratula
- Species: R. benghalensis

Binomial name
- Rostratula benghalensis (Linnaeus, 1758)
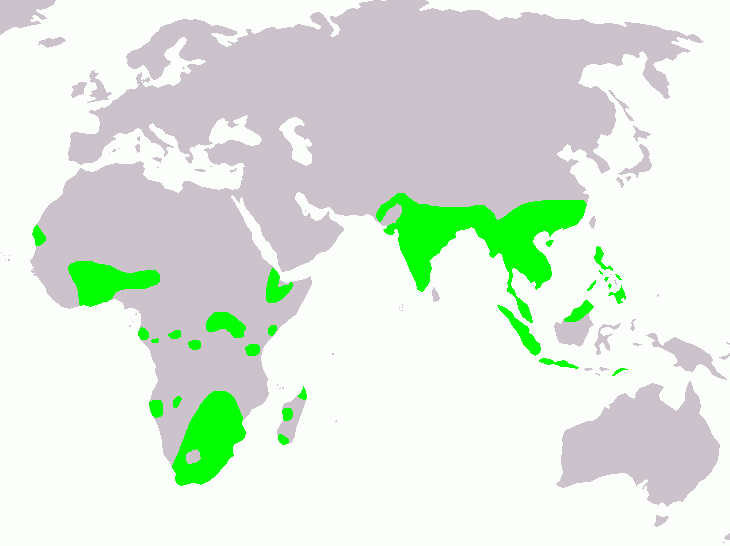
- Distribution

Synonyms
- Rallus benghalensis Linnaeus, 1758; Scolopax capensis Linnaeus, 1766

= Greater painted-snipe =

Species of bird

The greater painted-snipe (Rostratula benghalensis) is a species of wader in the small painted-snipe family Rostratulidae. It widely distributed across Africa and southern Asia and is found in a variety of wetland habitats, including swamps and the edges of larger water bodies such as lakes and rivers. This species is sexually dimorphic with the female being larger and more brightly coloured than the male. The female is normally polyandrous with the males incubating the eggs and caring for the young.

== Taxonomy ==
The greater painted-snipe was formally described in 1758 by the Swedish naturalist Carl Linnaeus in the tenth edition of his Systema Naturae. He placed it with the rails in the genus Rallus and coined the binomial name Rallus benghalenis. Linnaeus based his account on the "Bengall water rail" that had been described and illustrated in 1738 by the English naturalist Eleazar Albin in his A Natural History of Birds. Albin had examined a drawing that had been sent to the English silk-pattern designer Joseph Dandridge from Bengal. The greater painted-snipe is now placed with the Australian painted-snipe in the genus Rostratula that was introduced in 1816 by the French ornithologist Louis Vieillot. The species is treated as monotypic: no subspecies are recognised.

The Australian painted-snipe (Rostratula australis) was formerly treated as a subspecies but was promoted to species status based on the differences in morphology and in the vocal calls.

== Description ==
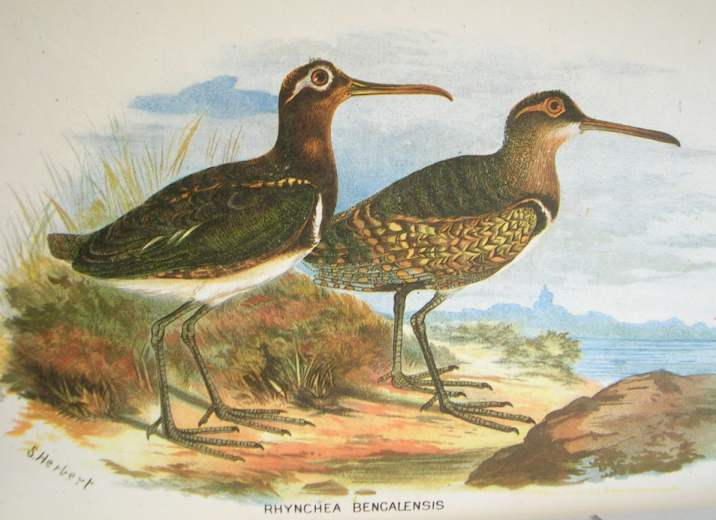
The female on the left is more colourful.

The greater painted-snipe is a medium-sized shorebird with an overall length of 23–28 cm (9.1–11.0 in). The species is sexually dimorphic: females are larger, heavier, and have bolder plumage than males. The female has a black head with a buff stripe and a white eye-patch. The neck is dark rufous. The upperparts are mostly dark bronze-green finely barred with black. A white stripe curves around the shoulder mantle. The underbody is white. The male is much paler and less uniform with barring on the scapulars and wing-coverts. The juvenile resembles the male but lacks the darker band around the chest.

It is not a vocal species; apart from the breeding season, it is mostly silent. The female may make a "mellow hooting or booming" sound.

== Distribution and habitat ==
Greater painted-snipe are very widely distributed; in mainland Africa as well as Madagascar and the Seychelles; in India, and Southeast Asia. Within Africa, they are found in the Nile River Valley and in the non-rainforested areas of Sub-Saharan Africa. They are notably absent from the eastern portion of Somalia, from the desert areas of Namibia, and from parts of Botswana and South Africa. Despite their wide distribution, they are uncommon within their range. There are between 31,000 and 1,000,000 mature individuals alive, according to BirdLife International.

Although this species inhabits a variety of wetland habitats, it prefers muddy areas with available cover (i.e., vegetation). It is also found on the edges of lakes and rivers, provided there is cover nearby, and in marshes and around swamps. They are usually found close to the fringes of reed beds along shorelines of marshes, swamps, ponds and streams.

== Behaviour ==
Greater painted-snipe usually live solitarily or in pairs, but sometimes are found in large groups. They are rather shy and retiring, skulking close to the vegetation so that they can retreat to cover if disturbed. When flushed, the birds fly like rails, with their legs dangling.

=== Food and feeding ===
Feeds on insects, snails, earthworms and crustacea as well as vegetable matter such as plant seeds. Uses scythe-like action of the head and bill in shallow water. They are generally crepuscular, feeding in the early morning and near dusk.

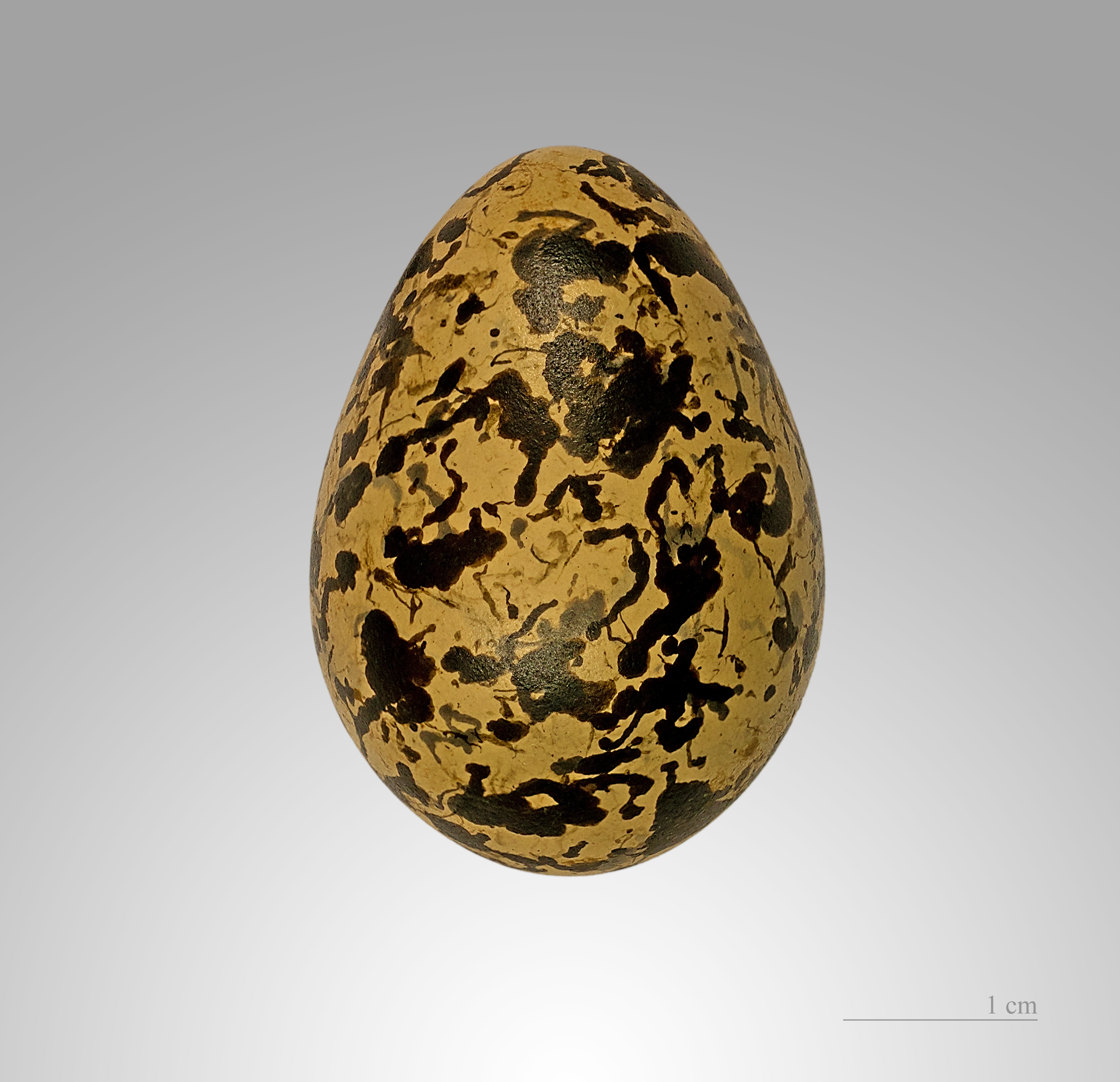
Egg, Muséum de Toulouse

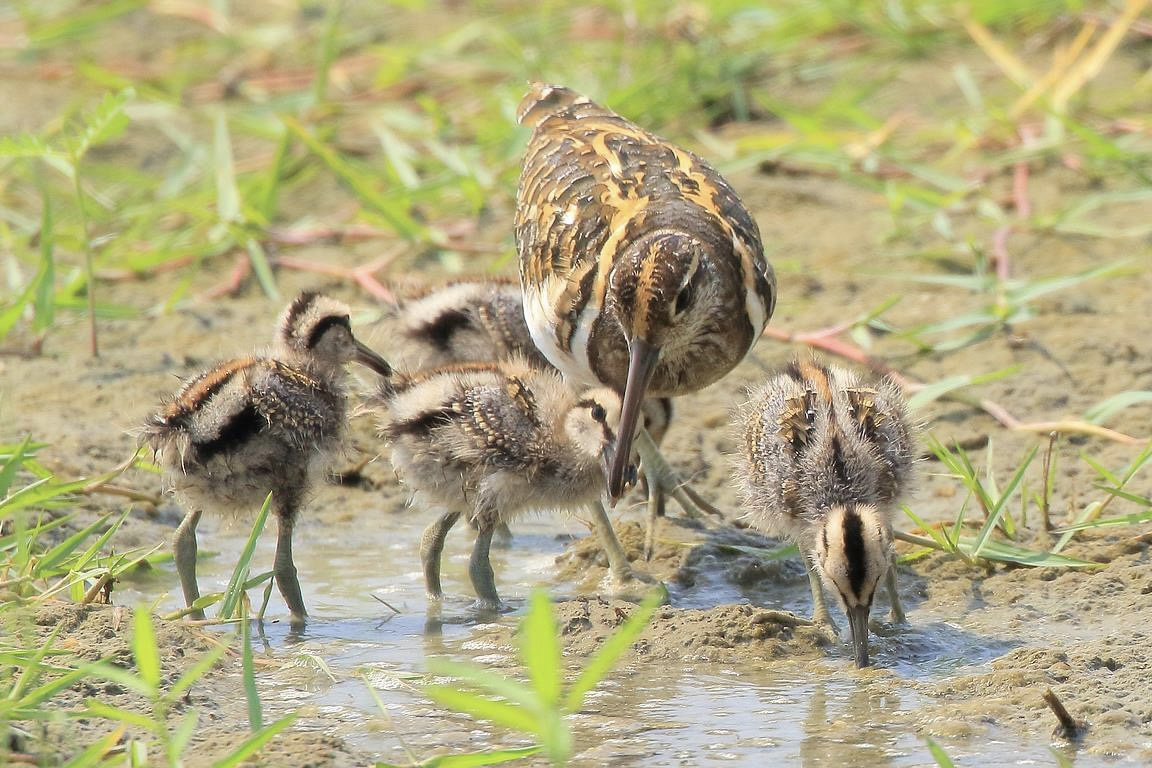
Male with chicks

=== Breeding ===
Greater painted-snipe are almost always polyandrous. The female initiates courtship and usually mates with two males in a season, but may mate with up to four. Males incubate the eggs and provide parental care. The females court the males, are polyandrous with males incubating and raising the young. The nest is a shallow scrape in soft ground, lined with plant material and situated among grass or reeds at the water's edge; sometimes a pad of vegetation or a nest of grass and weeds. It is usually well concealed. The clutch is normally 4 eggs. These have a light buff-yellow background and are covered with black-brown blotches, spots and lines. The eggs which measure 36 mm × 26 mm (1.4 in × 1.0 in) are incubated by the male for around 19 days. The young are precocial and nidifugous. They are brooded when they are small. The chicks are buff coloured and have black stripes running along their length.

== Conservation status ==
The greater painted-snipe is as "Least Concern" by the International Union for Conservation of Nature (IUCN), due to its large range and the relatively slow rate of population decrease.

== Gallery ==
Male, Egypt

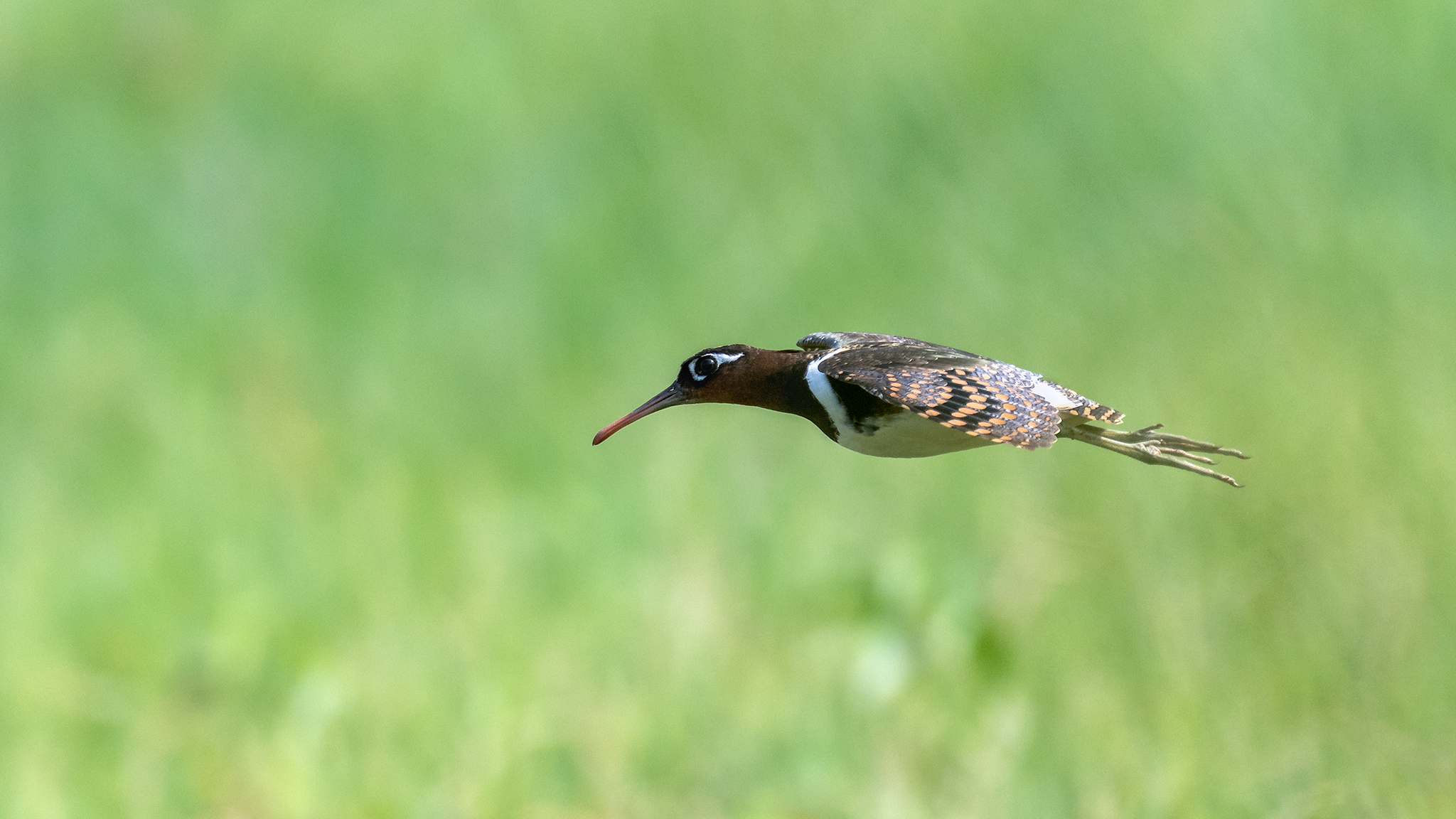
Female, Manjira Wildlife Sanctuary, Telangana, India

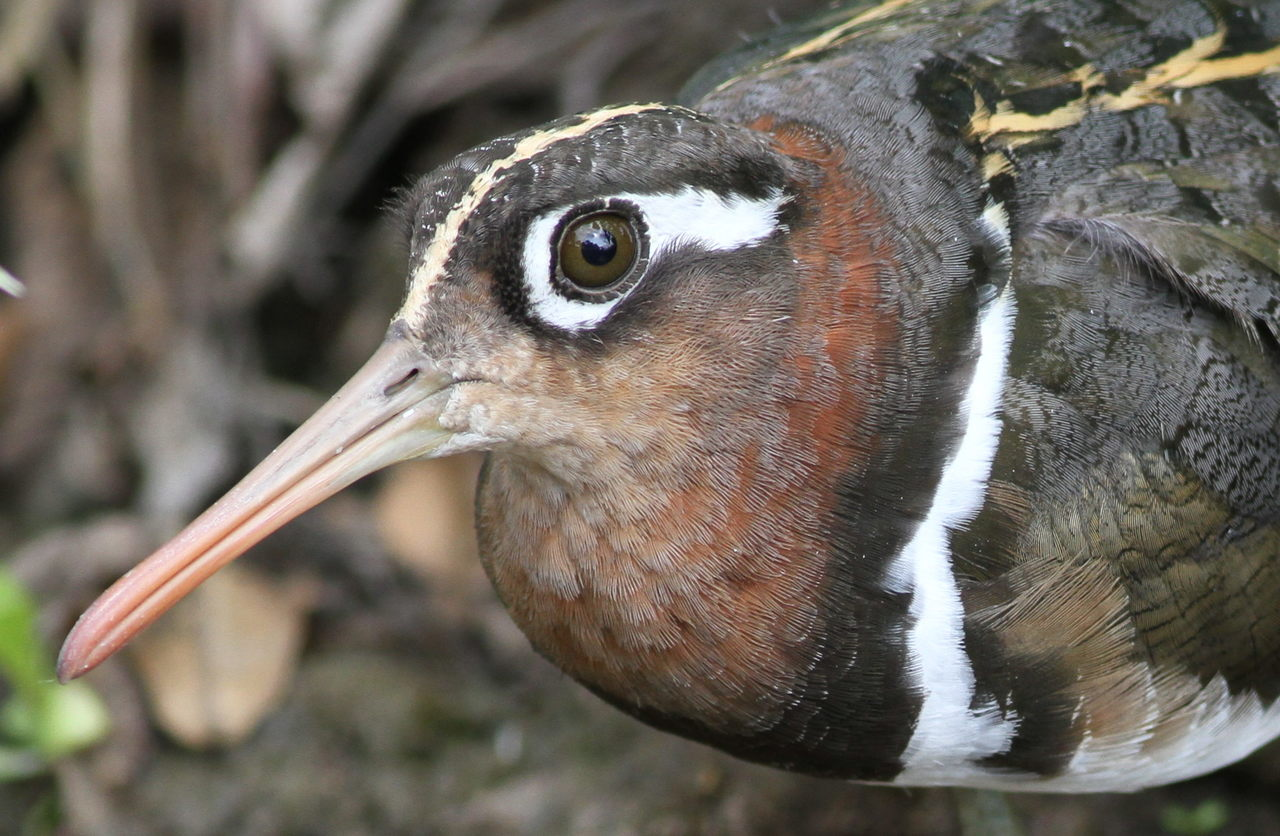
Female – Kruger National Park, South Africa

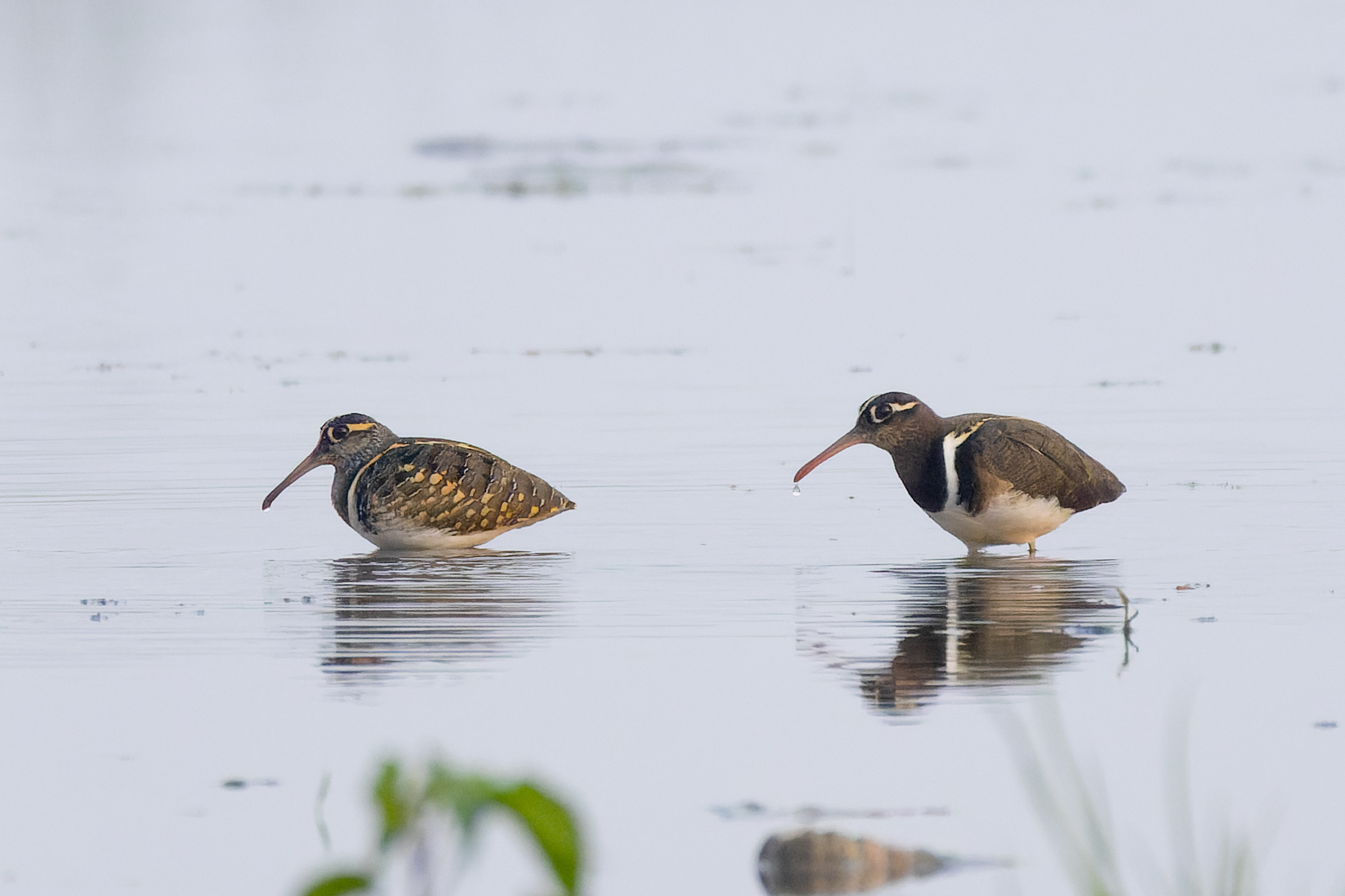
Male on left, female on right

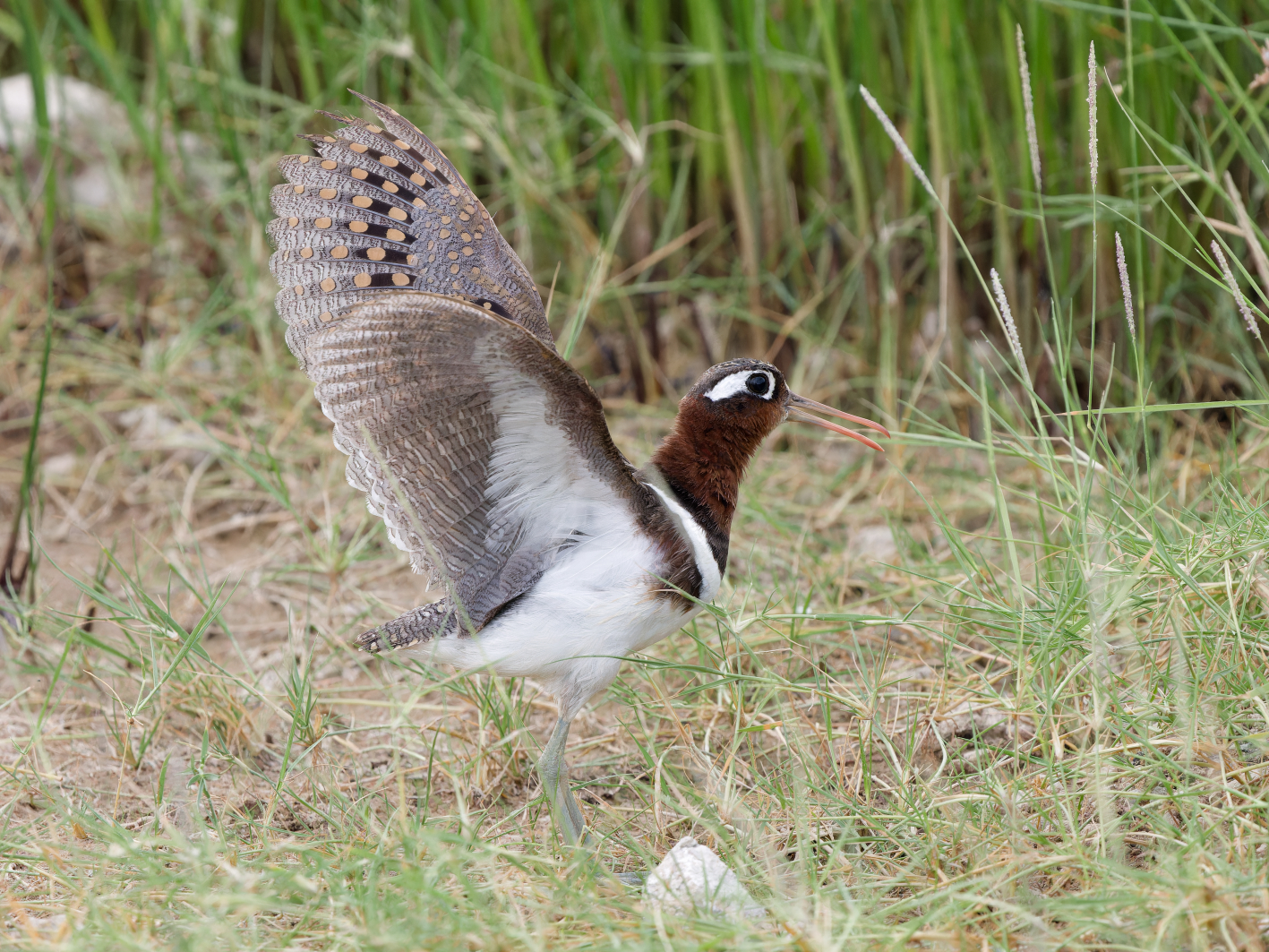
Raised-wing display of a female
