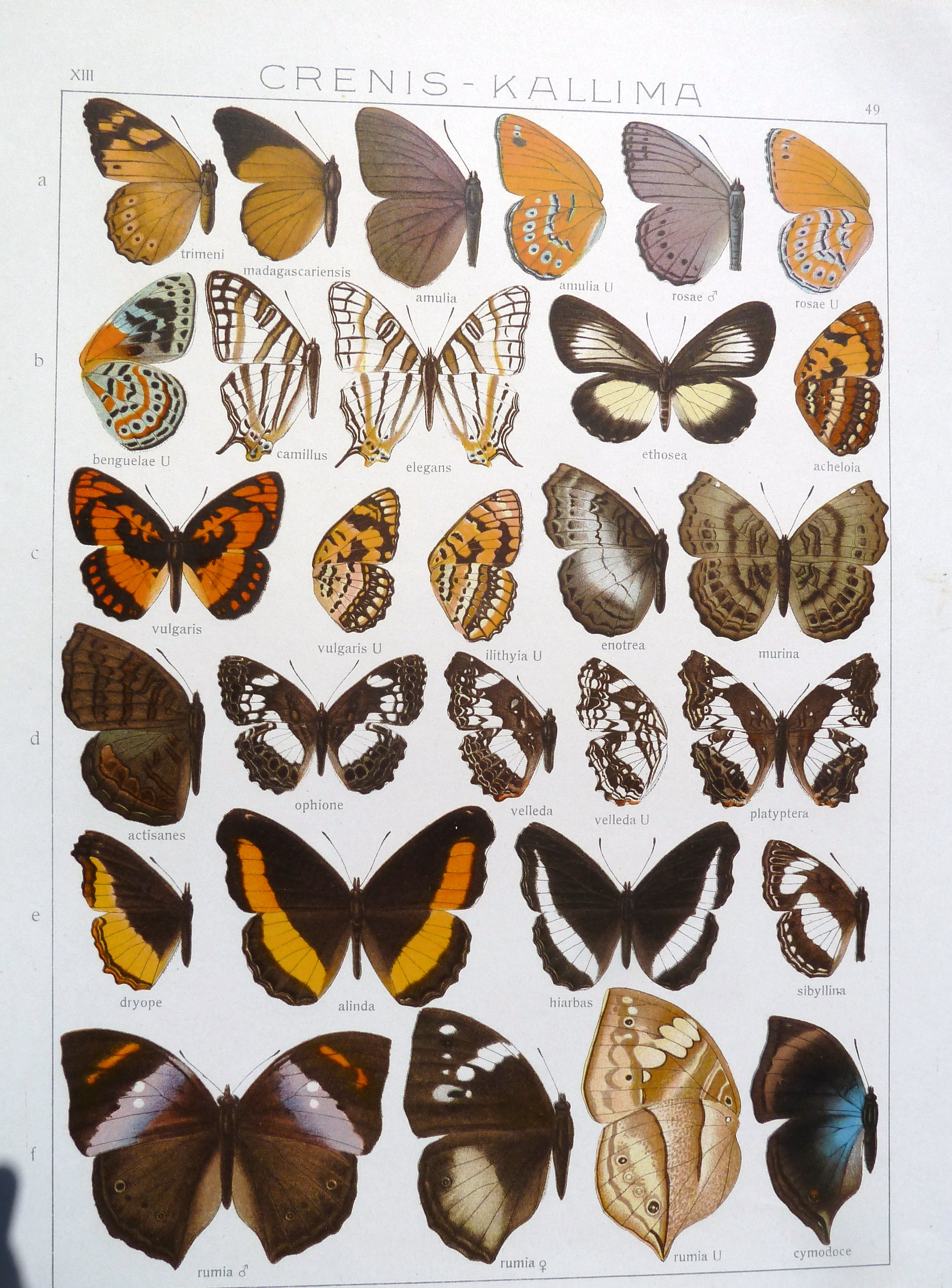
- In Adalbert Seitz's Fauna Africana

Scientific classification
- Domain: Eukaryota
- Kingdom: Animalia
- Phylum: Arthropoda
- Class: Insecta
- Order: Lepidoptera
- Family: Nymphalidae
- Genus: Eurytela
- Species: E. alinda

Binomial name
- Eurytela alinda Mabille, 1893

= Eurytela alinda =

Species of butterfly

Eurytela alinda, the forest golden piper, is a butterfly in the family Nymphalidae. It is found in Nigeria (the southern part of the country and the Cross River loop), Cameroon, Bioko, the Republic of the Congo, the Central African Republic and the Democratic Republic of the Congo. The habitat consists of clearings and secondary growth near forests.

The larvae feed on Tetracarpidium conophorum.
