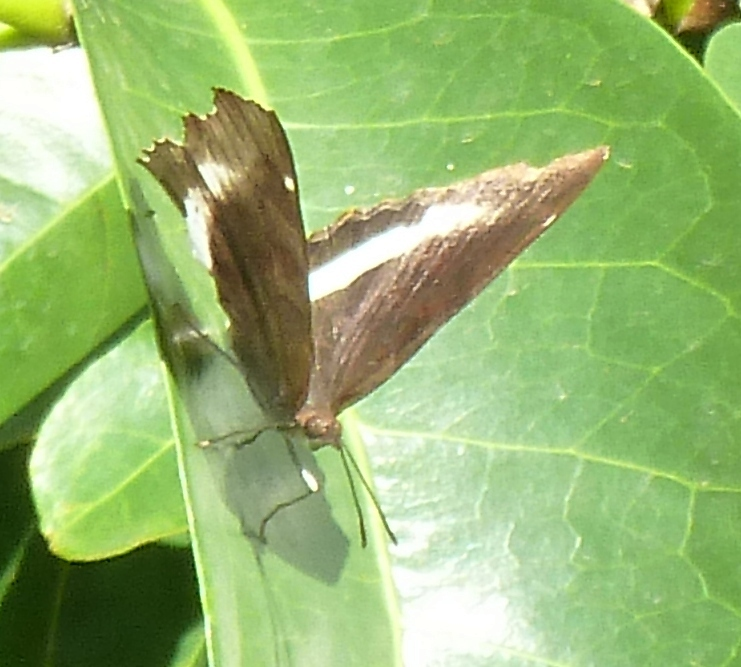

Conservation status
- Least Concern (IUCN 3.1)

Scientific classification
- Kingdom: Animalia
- Phylum: Arthropoda
- Clade: Pancrustacea
- Class: Insecta
- Order: Lepidoptera
- Family: Nymphalidae
- Genus: Eurytela
- Species: E. hiarbas

Binomial name
- Eurytela hiarbas (Drury, 1770)

Synonyms
- Papilio hiarbas Drury, 1782; Eurytela hiarbas var. angustata Aurivillius, 1894; Eurytela hiarbas ab. flavescens Aurivillius, 1894; Eurytela angustissima Strand, 1916

= Eurytela hiarbas =

Pied piper

Species of butterfly

Eurytela hiarbas, commonly known as the pied piper, is a butterfly of the family Nymphalidae, found in Sub-Saharan Africa.

Its wingspan is 45–50 mm in males and 48–55 mm in females. It has continuous broods, peaking between November and March.

Its larvae feed on Tragia glabrata, Dalechampia capensis, and Ricinus communis.

== Subspecies ==
Listed alphabetically:

- E. h. abyssinica Rothschild & Jordan, 1903 – Ethiopia
- E. h. angustata Lathy, 1901 – Eswatini, South Africa: Limpopo, Mpumalanga, North West, Gauteng, KwaZulu-Natal, Eastern Cape and Western Cape
- E. h. hiarbas (Drury, 1770) – Sierra Leone, Liberia, Ivory Coast, Ghana, Togo, Nigeria: south and the Cross River loop, Cameroon, Angola, Democratic Republic of the Congo, Uganda, western Tanzania
- E. h. lita Rothschild & Jordan, 1903 – Kenya, Tanzania, Malawi, Zambia, Mozambique, eastern Zimbabwe

Torben Larsen developed a species numbering system for his 2005 publication Butterflies of West Africa. The nominate subspecies is #836. The 'Larsen' numbers have since been used with permission in A Sharp Eye on Butterflies of Ghana.
