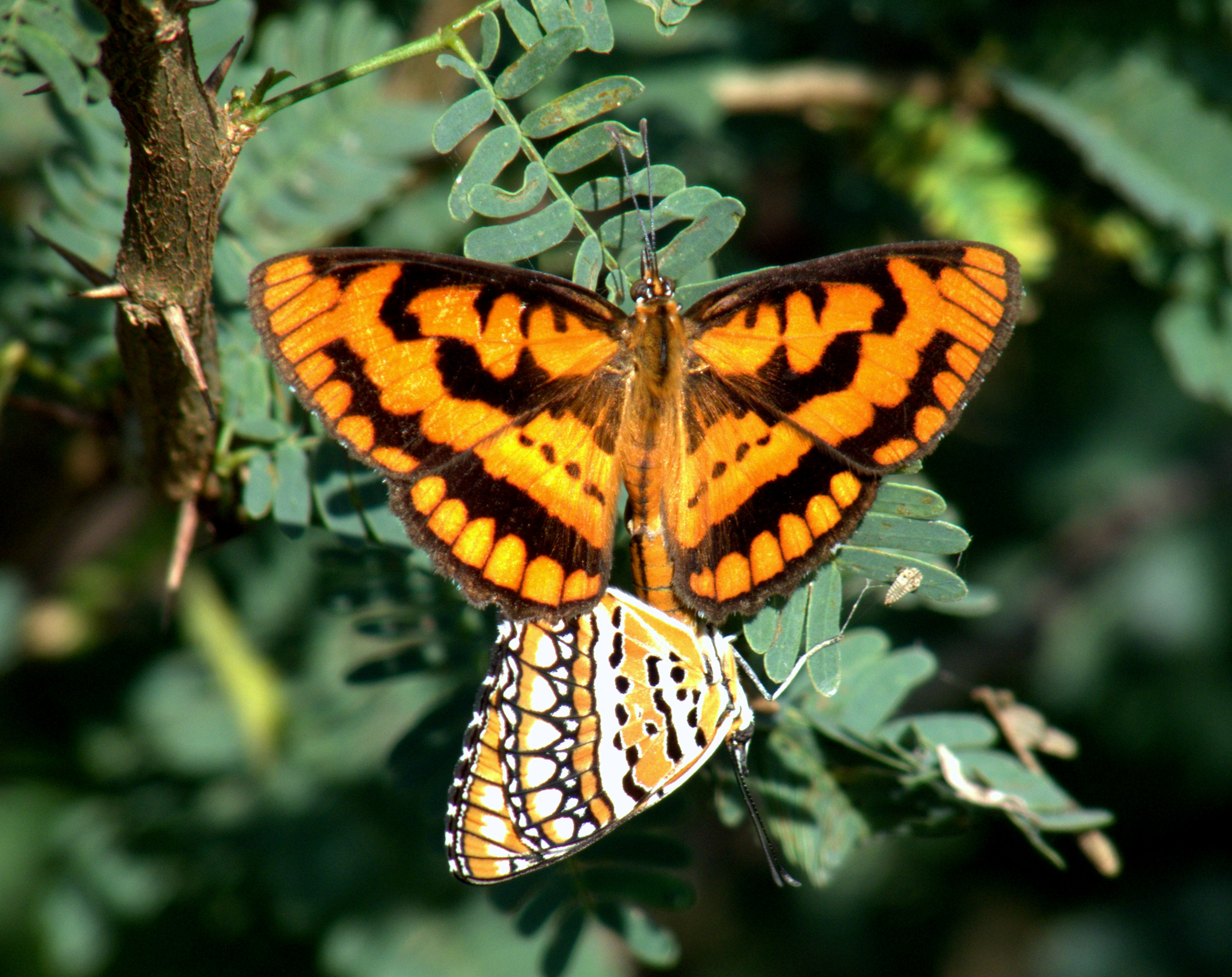
- Spotted jokers (Byblia ilithyia) mating

Scientific classification
- Domain: Eukaryota
- Kingdom: Animalia
- Phylum: Arthropoda
- Class: Insecta
- Order: Lepidoptera
- Family: Nymphalidae
- Tribe: Biblidini
- Genus: Byblia; Hübner, [1819]

Synonyms
- Hypanis Boisduval, 1833

= Byblia =

Joker butterflies

Genus of brush-footed butterflies

Byblia is a genus of nymphalid butterflies, commonly called jokers, found in Africa and the Indian subcontinent.

These butterflies are orange with black markings. They are attracted to rotting fruit and frequently open and close their wings when resting.

== Species ==
Listed alphabetically:

- Byblia anvatara (Boisduval, 1833) – common joker
- Byblia ilithyia (Drury, [1773]) – spotted joker
