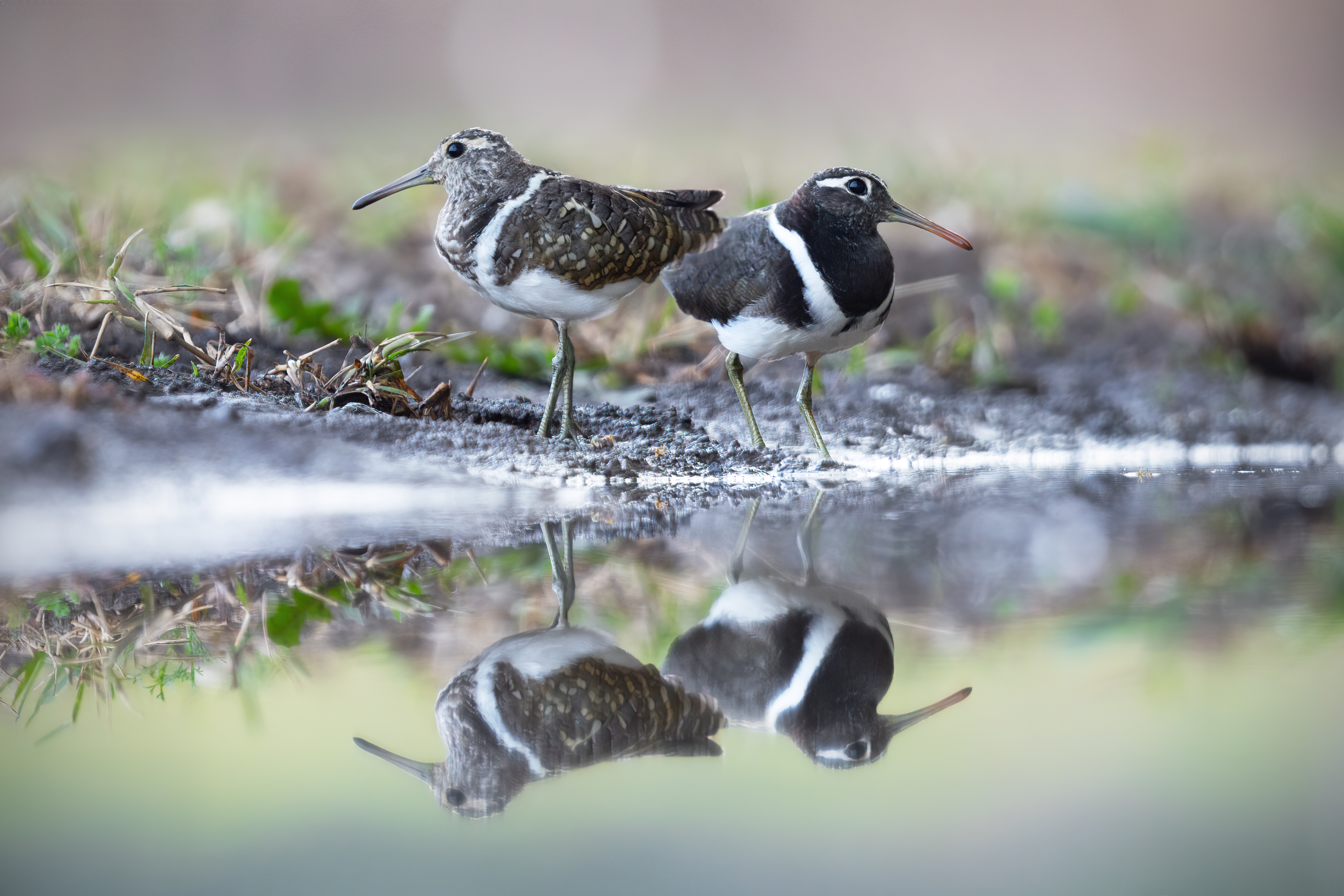

Conservation status
- Endangered (IUCN 3.1)

Scientific classification
- Kingdom: Animalia
- Phylum: Chordata
- Class: Aves
- Order: Charadriiformes
- Family: Rostratulidae
- Genus: Rostratula
- Species: R. australis

Binomial name
- Rostratula australis (Gould, 1838)

= Australian painted-snipe =

Species of bird

The Australian painted-snipe (Rostratula australis) is a medium-sized, long-billed, distinctively patterned wader.

== Taxonomy ==
The distinctiveness of the Australian painted-snipe was recognised by John Gould in 1838 when he described and named it Rostratula australis. However, it was subsequently lumped with the greater painted-snipe Rostratula benghalensis in 1934. More recently it has been shown that the differences between these taxa warrant recognition at the species level. Compared with the greater painted-snipe, the Australian painted-snipe:

- has a longer wing, shorter bill and shorter tarsus
- has a chocolate brown, rather than rufous, head and neck in the female
- has round, rather than flat and visually barred, spots on the tail (female) and upper wing-coverts (male)

== Description ==
The head, neck and upper breast is chocolate brown (in the male, dark grey with a buff median stripe on the crown), fading to rufous in the centre of the hindneck and merging to dark, barred grey on the back. There is a cream comma-shaped mark around the eye. A white stripe on the side of the breast and over the shoulders is diagnostic. The upperwing is grey (with buff spots in the male). The lower breast and underbody are white. Males are generally slightly smaller and less bright than females. Juveniles are similar to adult males. No call has been recorded.

The length ranges from 24 to 30 cm, the wingspan from 50 to 54 cm, the weight from 125 to 130 g.

== Distribution and habitat ==
The Australian painted-snipe is endemic to Australia, though its distribution is patchy and its presence in any particular area is unpredictable. A previous stronghold was the Riverina. It frequents shallow, freshwater wetlands with a thick cover of low vegetation, disappearing when conditions become unsuitable.

=== Conservation ===
The species has declined drastically during the 20th century and is rare throughout its range. Causes of the decline are ascribed to wetland drainage, river management and salinisation, as well as grazing and trampling of wetlands by stock. As of 2022, the global population is estimated to be 270 – 410 mature individuals. Because of this very small population size, the species is listed as Endangered by the IUCN. In Australia it is classified as being nationally threatened with a rating of Endangered as of May 2013.

== Behaviour ==
=== Diet ===
Wetland invertebrates such as worms, molluscs, insects and crustaceans; also seeds and other vegetation.

=== Breeding ===
Breeding painted-snipe prefer temporary but recently flooded wetlands, with low cover for shelter, shallow water and exposed mud for feeding, and small islands on which to nest. They nest in ground scrapes or on mounds in water, lined with grass, leaves and twigs, where they lay clutches of 3-4 cream-coloured eggs marked with black streaks. Incubation takes 15–16 days. The young are precocial and nidifugous.

Samsonvale Cemetery, Jan 1999
