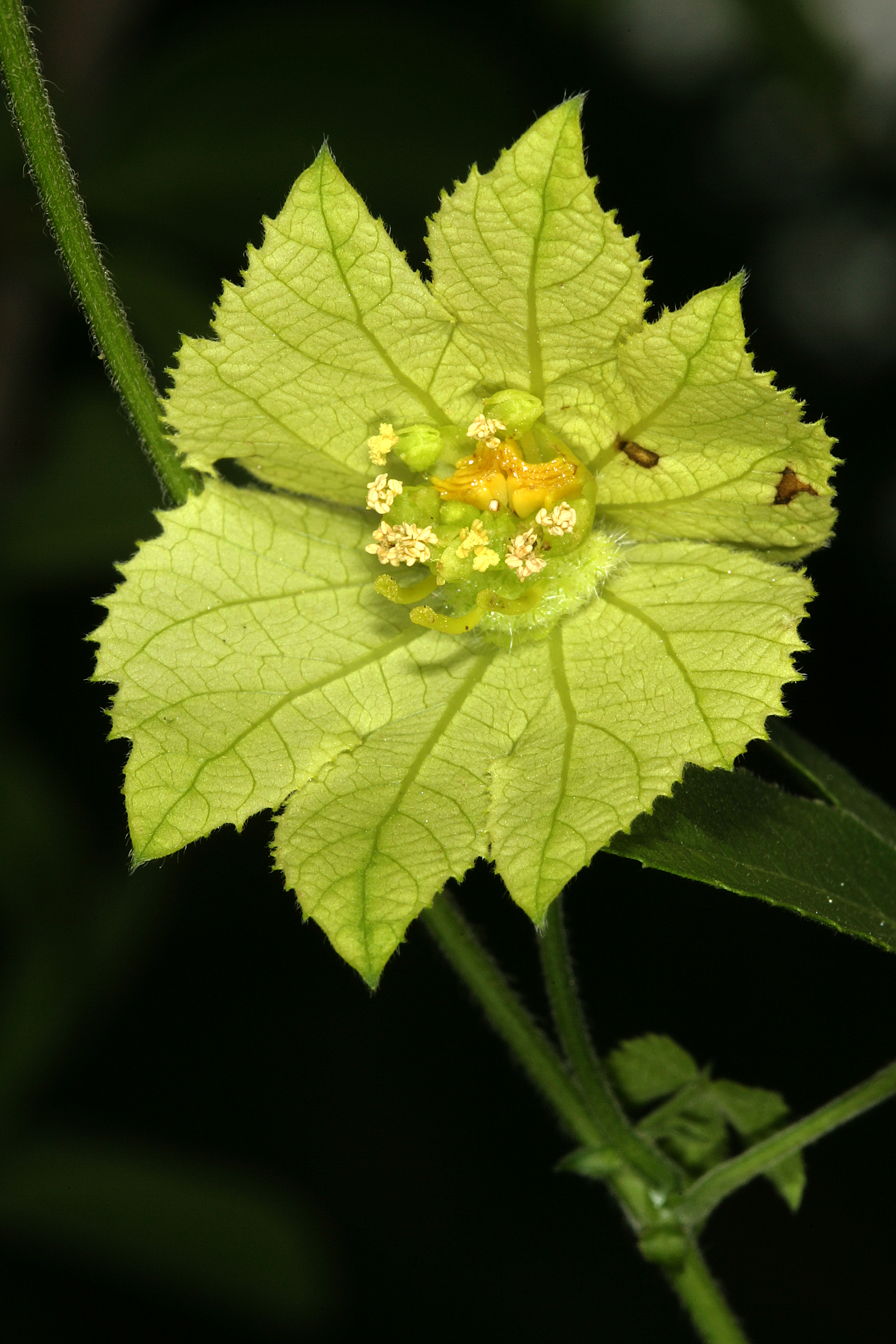

Scientific classification
- Kingdom: Plantae
- Clade: Tracheophytes
- Clade: Angiosperms
- Clade: Eudicots
- Clade: Rosids
- Order: Malpighiales
- Family: Euphorbiaceae
- Genus: Dalechampia
- Species: D. capensis

Binomial name
- Dalechampia capensis A.Spreng.

Synonyms
- Dalechampia kirkii Prain; Dalechampia volubilis E.Mey. ex Baill.

= Dalechampia capensis =

Species of plant

Dalechampia capensis is a species of shrub. It is known by the common names inzula or wild hop.

It is native to Botswana, South Africa, Mozambique, Eswatini, Tanzania, and Zambia. The species is eaten by larval Byblia ilithyia and Eurytela dryope.
