= Manjira Wildlife Sanctuary =

Wildlife sanctuary in Telangana, India

- IUCN category IV (habitat/species management area)
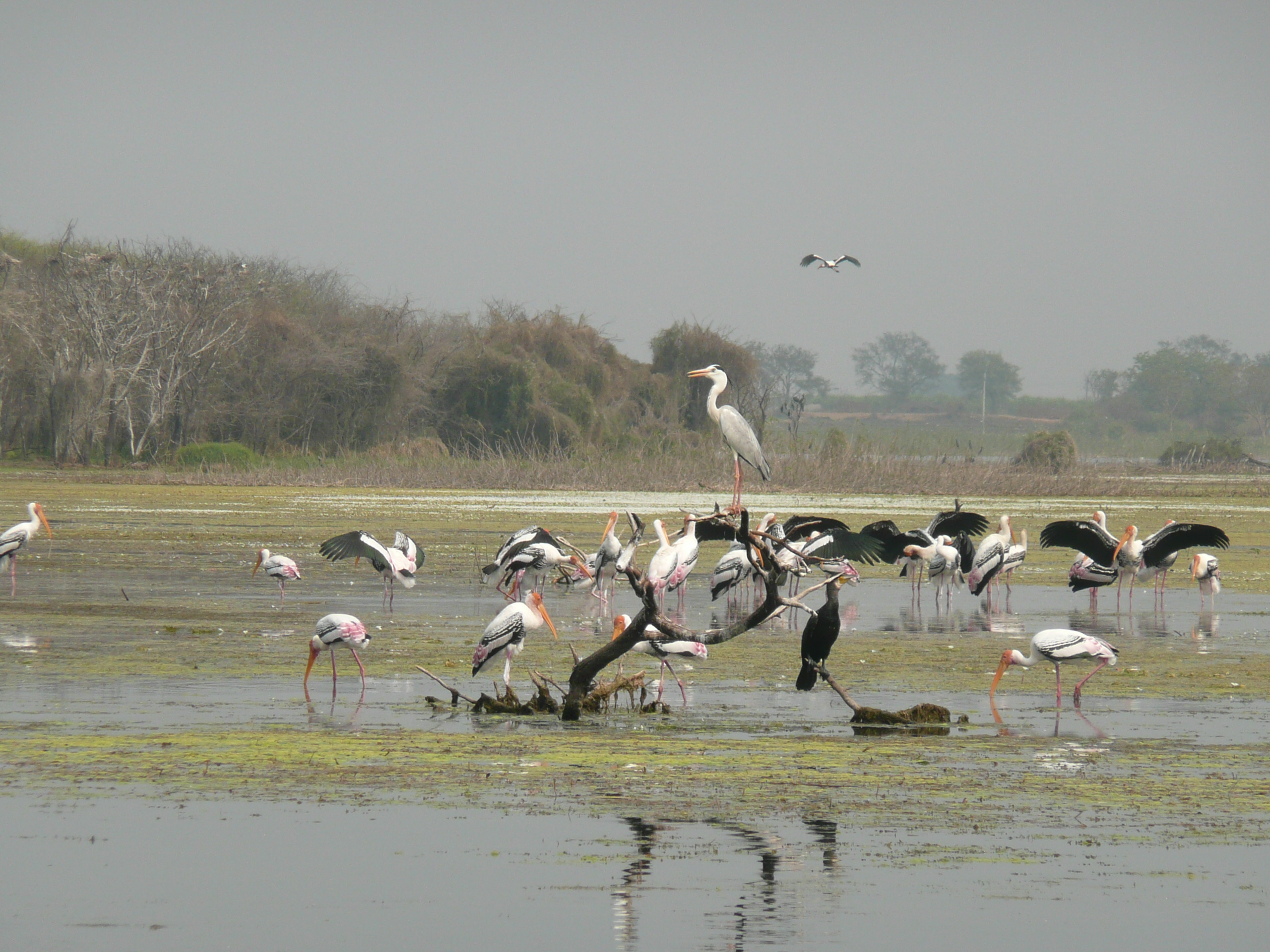
- Migratory birds in the Manjira Wildlife Sanctuary

- Location within Telangana Location within India
- Interactive map of Manjira Wildlife Sanctuary
- Location: Telangana, India
- Coordinates: 17°41′35″N 78°0′23″E
- Area: 20 km^{2} (4,900 acres)
- Established: June 1978 (48 years ago)

Manjira wildlife sanctuary is a wildlife sanctuary and reservoir located in the Sangareddy district of Telangana State, India. Originally a crocodile sanctuary developed to protect the vulnerable species mugger crocodile, today it is home to more than 70 species of birds. The reservoir, located in the sanctuary, provides drinking water to Hyderabad and Secundarabad.

== Geography ==
Manjira Wildlife Sanctuary is located in the Medak District of Telangana, India, 50 km northwest of Hyderabad. The sanctuary follows the course of the Manjira River for 36 km.

This man-made reservoir provides drinking water to Hyderabad and Secunderabad. It has nine small islands, including Puttigadda, Bapangadda, Sangamadda and Karnamgadda. These islands contain extensive marshy fringes, which act as nesting sites for aquatic birds. Additionally, a thick cover of trees provide nesting spots for other birds.

Dry Savannah-type of vegetation is found in the sanctuary. The reservoir supports both submergent and emergent types of vegetation. The plant species of Typha, Ipomoea and Acacia cover the periphery of the waterline, while agricultural fields surround the reservoir and river.

Average temperature of the region ranges from 15°C-42°C. Average rainfall of the region is 915 mm.

== Flora and fauna ==
Flora:

This wildlife sanctuary is a freshwater ecosystem. The plant species of Typha, Ipomoea and Acacia cover the periphery of the waterline, while agricultural fields surround the reservoir and the river. Some of the major plant species found are Ipomea, Babool, Prosopis, Vallisneria, Eichhornia, and reeds.

Fauna:

This wildlife sanctuary is a riverine habitat supporting mugger crocodile, fresh water turtles, prawns, molluscs, and fish like catla, rohu, murrel, eel, karugu and chidwa. Among reptiles, monitor lizard, mugger crocodile, turtles and cobra are present. The Indian hare, wild boar, mongoose and jackal are also present.

Avifauna:

Around 73 species of birds are present in the sanctuary, including large flocks of common teal, cotton pygmy goose and ruddy shelduck. A large number of cranes and barheaded geese can be found upstream of the Manjeera lake. Fourteen species of birds breed in the sanctuary, including the Asian openbill, painted stork, Eurasian coot and black-crowned night heron. Other birds found in the sanctuary include the little egret, cormorant, pochard, spoonbill, brahminy duck, pintail, kite, quail, and peacock.

In recent times, vulnerable species like lesser adjutant and Indian skimmer have been spotted at the sanctuary, as have the near-threatened species darter and Oriental white ibis.

== Crocodiles ==
In 1974, the mugger crocodile had reached the threshold of extinction in Telangana, with only four pairs of mugger crocodile remaining in the Manjira wildlife sanctuary. To conserve the mugger crocodile, the Andhra Pradesh Government established a crocodile sanctuary at this present day site. Today there are approximately 400 to 600 crocodiles in the sanctuary helped by a crocodile breeding program that is carried out here. In the mid-1980s, Manjira became a popular destination for bird watchers and an annual aquatic bird count was initiated, leading to the park's conversion into a general wildlife sanctuary.

== Cultural sites ==
On the banks of the river, in a village called Kalabgur, there is a temple that is said to have been constructed some 800 years ago during the Kakatiya period. The temple has magnificent architecture and is entirely made of stone, with some standing pillars created out of a single stone. The temple deity is lord Shiva. The temple also has other gods such as lord Krishna, lord Ganapathy and goddess Saraswathi.

== Park-specific information ==
The sanctuary has an Environmental Education Centre consisting of a museum, a library, and an auditorium. Films about birds and animals are shown daily. Boat services are available to take the visitors around the sanctuary for bird watching, with binoculars and books to identify birds provided to visitors. The museum has exhibits which depict the complex biodiversity of the wetlands.

The best season to visit this sanctuary is from November to March when major migrant birds nest and breed here. Accommodation for visitors is available in inspection bungalows at Sangareddy, Singur and Sadasivapet.
