= Zuni ethnobotany =

This is a list of plants and how they are used in Zuni culture.

== A ==
- Abronia fragrans (snowball sand-verbena), fresh flowers eaten for stomachaches.
- Achillea millefolium var. occidentalis (western yarrow), the blossoms and root are chewed, and the juice applied before fire-walking or fire-eating. A poultice of the pulverized plant is mixed with water and applied to burns.
- Achnatherum hymenoides (Indian ricegrass), ground seeds used as a staple before the availability of corn.
- Ageratina occidentalis (western snakeroot), ingredient of "schumaakwe cakes" and used externally for rheumatism and swelling.
- Alnus incana subsp. tenuifolia (thinleaf alder), bark used to dye deerskin reddish brown.
- Amaranthus blitoides (mat amaranth), seeds originally eaten raw, but later ground with black corn meal, made into balls and eaten.
- Amaranthus cruentus (red amaranth), feathery part of plant ground into a fine meal and used to color ceremonial bread red. The crushed leaves and blossoms are moistened and rubbed on cheeks as rouge.
- Ambrosia acanthicarpa (flatspine burr ragweed), an infusion of the whole plant is taken and used as wash for obstructed menstruation. The ground root is also placed in a tooth for a toothache.
- Amsonia tomentosa var. tomentosa (woolly bluestar), compound poultice of root applied with much ceremony to rattlesnake bite.
- Artemisia carruthii (Carruth's sagewort), the seeds of which are placed on coals and used as a sweat bath for body pains from a severe cold. The ground seeds are also mixed with water, made into balls, steamed and used for food. These seeds are considered to be one of the most important food plants.
- Artemisia frigida (fringed sagewort), the whole plant is made into an infusion for colds. Sprigs of this plant and corn ears are attached to decorated tablets and carried by female dancers in a drama. The sprigs are also dipped in water and planted with corn so it will grow abundantly.
- Artemisia tridentata (big sagebrush), an infusion of the leaves is used externally for body aches. The infusion is also taken as a cold medicine. It is also placed in shoes to treat athlete's foot, fissures between toes, and as a foot deodorant.
- Asclepias involucrata (dwarf milkweed), the dry powdered root of which is mixed with saliva and used for an unspecified illness. The Zuni also noted that this plant is favored by jackrabbits.
- Asclepias subverticillata (whorled milkweed), the buds of which are eaten by little boys. The pods are also gathered when two-thirds ripe and the fibers are used for weaving clothing. The coma is made into cords and used for fastening plumes to the prayer sticks.
- Astragalus amphioxys (crescent milkvetch), the fresh or dried root chewed by medicine man before sucking snakebite and poultice applied to wound.
- Astragalus lentiginosus var. diphysus (speckledpod milkvetch), the pods of the diphysus variety are eaten fresh, boiled, or salted. They are also dried and stored for winter use.
- Atriplex argentea (silverscale saltbush), a poultice of chewed root is applied to sores and rashes. An infusion of the root is also taken for stomachache.
- Atriplex canescens (fourwing saltbush), an infusion of dried root and blossoms or a poultice of blossoms is used for ant bites. Twigs are also attached to prayer plumes and sacrificed to the cottontail rabbit to ensure good hunting.
- Atriplex powellii (Powell's saltweed), the seeds of which were eaten raw before the presence of corn and afterwards. They are also ground with corn meal and made into a mush.

== B ==
- Bahia dissecta (ragleaf bahia), the powdered plant is rubbed on affected parts for a headache, and for rheumatism.
- Berberis fremontii (Fremont's mahonia), crushed berries used as purple coloring for the skin and for objects employed in ceremonies.
- Berula erecta (cutleaf waterparsnip), ingredient of "schumaakwe cakes" and used externally for rheumatism. An infusion of whole plant used as wash for rashes and athlete's foot infection.
- Bouteloua gracilis (blue grama), Grass bunches tied together and the severed end used as a hairbrush, the other as a broom. Bunches are also used to strain goat's milk.

== C ==
- Caesalpinia jamesii (James' holdback), infusion of plant given to sheep to make them "prolific".
- Calliandra humilis (dwarf stickpea), the powdered root of which is used three times a day for rashes.
- Campanula parryi (Parry's bellflower) – blossoms are chewed, and the saliva is applied to the skin as a depilatory. A poultice of chewed root is also applied to bruises.
- Castilleja integra (wholeleaf Indian paintbrush), root bark mixed with minerals to dye deerskin black.
- Chaetopappa ericoides (rose heath), infusion of whole pulverized plant applied is rubbed on the body for the pain from a cold, swellings, and rheumatism. A warm infusion of the plant is also taken to hasten parturition.
- Chamaesyce albomarginata (whitemargin sandmat), leaves and roots eaten to promote lactation.
- Chamaesyce polycarpa (smallseed sandmat), warm gruel made with plant and white cornmeal taken to promote milk flow.
- Chamaesyce serpyllifolia subsp. serpyllifolia (thymeleaf sandmat), plant used as a cathartic, an emetic, and to increase the flow of milk in a breastfeeding mother. The leaves are also chewed for the pleasant taste and used to sweeten corn meal.
- Chenopodium album (lambsquarters), young plants cooked as greens. Note: This plant is not native to the Americas, and was introduced.
- Chenopodium graveolens (fetid goosefoot), plant steeped in water and vapor inhaled for headache.
- Chenopodium leptophyllum (narrowleaf goosefoot), young plants boiled alone or with meat and used for food. Ground seeds mixed with corn meal and salt, made into a stiff batter, formed into balls and steamed. Seeds considered among the most important food plants when the Zuni reached this world.
- Cirsium ochrocentrum (yellowspine thistle), infusion of plant taken by both partners as a contraceptive. Infusion of whole plant taken as a diaphoretic, diuretic, and emetic to treat syphilis. Infusion of fresh or dried root taken three times a day for diabetes.
- Cleome serrulata (Rocky Mountain beeplant), leaves gathered in large quantities and hung indoors to dry for winter use. Young leaves cooked with corn strongly flavored with chile. Plant paste used with black mineral paint to color sticks of plume offerings to anthropic gods. Whole plant except for the root used in pottery decorations.
- Conyza canadensis var. canadensis (Canadian horseweed), crushed flowers inserted in nostrils to cause sneezing, relieving rhinitis.
- Coreopsis tinctoria var. tinctoria (golden tickseed), infusion of whole plant, except for the root, taken by women desiring female babies. Plant formerly used to make a hot beverage until the introduction of coffee by traders. The blossoms are used to make a mahogany red dye for yarn.
- Coriandrum sativum (coriander), powdered seeds ground with chile and used a condiment with meat, leaves used as a salad. Note: This plant is not native to the Americas, and was introduced.
- Croton texensis (Texas croton), decoction of plant taken for "sick stomach", as a purgative, and as a diuretic. An infusion is taken for stomachaches, for syphilis, and for gonorrhea. Fresh or dried root chewed by medicine man before sucking snakebite and poultice applied to wound.
- Cryptantha crassisepala (thicksepal catseye), hot infusion of pulverized plant applied to limbs for fatigue.
- Cucurbita foetidissima (Missouri gourd), poultice of powdered seeds, flowers and saliva applied to swellings.
- Cucurbita pepo (field pumpkin), used as an ingredient in "schumaakwe cakes" and is used externally for rheumatism and swelling. A poultice of seeds and blossoms is applied to cactus scratches. Fresh squash is cut into spiral strips, folded into hanks and hung up to dry for winter use. The blossoms are cooked in grease and used as a delicacy in combination with other foods. Fresh squash, either whole or in pieces, is roasted in ashes and used for food. The gourds made into cups, ladles and dippers and put to various uses. The gourds are also worn in phallic dances symbolizing fructification or made into ceremonial rattles. Gourds are also made into receptacles for storing precious articles.
- Cycloloma atriplicifolium (winged pigweed), seeds mixed with ground corn to make a mush. Tiny seeds ground, mixed with corn meal and made into steamed cakes. The blossoms are chewed and rubbed all over the hands for protection.

== D ==
- Dalea compacta (compact praireclover), the root of which is made into a poultice and used for sores and rashes, and an infusion is taken for stomachache.
- Dalea lasiathera (purple praireclover), the root of which is chewed as candy, especially by children. Flowers crushed by hand and sprinkled into meat stew as a flavoring after cooking.
- Datura wrightii (sacred thornapple), powdered root given as an anesthetic and a narcotic for surgery. Poultice of root and flower meal applied to wounds to promote healing. The root pieces are chewed by a robbery victim to determine the identity of the thief. The powdered root is used by rain priests in a number of ways to ensure fruitful rains.
- Dimorphocarpa wislizeni (touristplant), warm infusion of pulverized plant applied to swelling, especially the throat. Decoction of entire plant given for delirium. Infusion of taken by men to "loosen their tongues so they may talk like fools & drunken men". Flower and fruit eaten as an emetic for stomachaches.

== E ==
- Ephedra nevadensis (Nevada jointfir), an infusion of the whole plant, except for the root, taken for syphilis.
- Ericameria nauseosa subsp. nauseosa var. bigelovii (rubber rabbitbrush), the blossoms of which are used to make a yellow dye. Stems used to make baskets.
- Eriogonum alatum (winged buckwheat), root eaten as an emetic for stomachaches. Infusion of powdered root taken after a fall and relieve general misery.
- Eriogonum fasciculatum (eastern Mohave buckwheat), poultice of powdered root applied to cuts and arrow or bullet wounds. Decoction of root taken after parturition to heal lacerations. Decoction of root also taken for hoarseness and colds involving the throat.
- Eriogonum jamesii (James' buckwheat), root soaked in water and used as a wash for sore eyes. Fresh or dried root eaten for stomachaches. Root carried in mouth for sore tongue, and then buried in river bottom. Ground blossom powder given to ceremonial dancers impersonating anthropic gods to bring rain.
- Erodium cicutarium (redstem stork's bill), poultice of chewed root applied to sores and rashes. Infusion of root taken for stomachache.
- Erysimum capitatum (sanddune wallflower), an infusion of the whole plant is used externally muscle aches. The flower and the fruit are also eaten as an emetic for stomachaches.

== G ==
- Gaura mollis (velvetweed), fresh or dried root chewed by medicine man before sucking snakebite and poultice applied to wound.
- Glycyrrhiza lepidota (American licorice), root chewed to keep the mouth sweet and moist.
- Gossypium hirsutum (upland cotton), cotton used to make ceremonial garments. Fuzz made into cords and used ceremonially.
- Grindelia nuda, aphanactis variety (curly gumweed), poultice of flower applied to ant bites. Fresh or dried root chewed by medicine man before sucking snakebite and poultice applied to wound.
- Gutierrezia sarothrae (broom snakeweed), infusion of blossoms taken as a diaphoretic. Infusion of blossoms taken as a diuretic for "obstinate cases". Infusion of blossoms taken to "make one strong in the limbs and muscles." Infusion of whole plant used for muscle aches. Infusion of whole plant taken to increase strength for urinary retention.

== H ==
- Helianthus annuus (common sunflower), fresh or dried root chewed by medicine man before sucking snakebite and poultice applied to wound. Compound poultice of root applied with much ceremony to rattlesnake bite. Blossoms used ceremonially for anthropic worship.
- Hymenopappus filifolius (fineleaf hymenopappus), a poultice of chewed root with lard applied to swellings. A warm decoction of the root taken as an emetic. The root is also used as chewing gum.
- Hymenoxys richardsonii (pingue hymenoxys), poultice of chewed root applied to sores and rashes, and an infusion of the root is used for stomachache.

== I ==
- Ipomopsis longiflora, longiflora subspecies (flaxflowered gilia), poultice of dried, powdered flowers and water applied to remove hair on newborns and children.
- Ipomopsis multiflora (manyflowered gilia), powdered, whole plant applied to face for headache. Powdered plant applied to wounds. Crushed blossoms smoked in corn husks to "relieve strangulation".
- Iris missouriensis (Rocky Mountain iris), poultice of chewed root applied to increase strength of newborns and infants.

== J ==
- Juniperus monosperma (oneseed juniper), poultice of chewed root applied to increase strength of newborns and infants. An infusion of the leaves is also taken for muscle aches and to prevent conception. An infusion of the leaves is also taken postpartum to prevent uterine cramps and stop vaginal bleeding. A simple or compound infusion of twigs at is used to promote muscular contractions at birth and used after birth to stop blood flow. The wood is also used as a favorite and ceremonial firewood, and the shredded, fibrous bark is specifically used as tinder to ignite the fire sticks used for the New Year fire.

== K ==
- Krascheninnikovia lanata (winterfat), poultice of ground root applied to burns and bound with cotton cloth.

== L ==
- Lactuca tatarica, var pulchella (blue lettuce), dried root gum used as chewing gum.
- Ligusticum porteri (Porter's licoriceroot), infusion of root used for body aches, Root chewed by medicine man and patient during curing ceremonies for various illnesses, crushed root and water used as wash and taken for sore throat.
- Linum puberulum (plains flax), berry juice squeezed into eye for inflammation.
- Lithospermum incisum (narrowleaf gromwell), salve of powdered root applied ceremonially to swelling of any body part. Poultice of root used and decoction of plant taken for swelling and sore throat. Powdered root mixed with bum branch resin and used for abrasions and skin infections. Infusion of root taken for stomachache. Infusion of root taken for kidney problems. Leaves bound to arrow shafts, close to the point, obscured by sinew wrapping and used in wartime.
- Lobelia cardinalis (cardinalflower), ingredient of "schumaakwe cakes" and used externally for rheumatism and swelling.
- Lotus wrightii (Wright's deervetch), poultice of chewed root applied to swellings caused by being witched by a bullsnake.
- Lycium pallidum (pale wolfberry), berries eaten raw when perfectly ripe or boiled and sometimes sweetened. Ground leaves, twigs and flowers given to warriors for protection during war.

== M ==
- Machaeranthera canescens subsp. canescens var. canescens (cutleaf goldenweed), infusion of whole plant taken and rubbed on abdomen as an emetic.
- Machaeranthera tanacetifolia (tansyleaf aster), infusion of flowers taken with other flowers for unspecified illnesses.
- Mentzelia pumila (dwarf mentzelia), plant inserted into rectum as a suppository for constipation. Plant used to whip children to make them strong so they could hold on to a horse without falling.
- Mirabilis linearis (narrowleaf four o'clock), root eaten to induce urination and vomiting. Infusion of the root taken for stomachache.
- Mirabilis multiflora (Colorado four o'clock), powdered root mixed with flour, made into a bread and used to decrease appetite. Infusion of root taken and rubbed on abdomen of hungry adults and children. Infusion of powdered root taken by adults or children after overeating.
- Muhlenbergia rigens (deergrass), grass attached to sticks of plume offerings to anthropic gods.

== N ==
- Nicotiana attenuata (coyote tobacco), the smoke of which is blown over the body to reduce the throbbing from rattlesnake bite. It is also smoked ceremonially.

== O ==
- Oenothera albicaulis (whitish evening primrose), the chewed blossoms of which are rubbed on the bodies of young girls so that they can dance well and ensure rain.
- Oenothera coronopifolia (crownleaf evening primrose), poultice of powdered flower and saliva applied at night to swellings.
- Oenothera elata, ssp. hookeri (Hooker's evening primrose), poultice of powdered flower and saliva applied at night to swellings.
- Oenothera triloba (stemless evening primrose), ingredient of "schumaakwe cakes" and used externally for rheumatism and swelling. The roots are also ground and used as food.
- Opuntia imbricata var. imbricata (tree cholla), used ceremonially.
- Opuntia whipplei (whipple cholla), fruits, with the spines rubbed off, are dried for winter use. Spineless fruits are eaten raw or stewed.
- Oreocarya suffruticosa var. suffruticosa (syn. Cryptantha cinerea var. jamesii, James' catseye), powdered root used for sore anus.
- Orobanche fasciculata (clustered broomrape), the powdered plant is inserted into the rectum as a hemorrhoid remedy.

== P ==
- Pectis papposa (cinchweed fetidmarigold), the Zuni people take an infusion of the whole plant as a carminative, and use an infusion of the blossoms as eye drops for snowblindness. The Zuni also use the chewed blossoms as perfume before a dance in ceremonies of the secret fraternities.
- Penstemon barbatus ssp. torreyi (Torrey's penstemon), chewed root rubbed over the rabbit stick to insure success in the hunt.
- Phacelia neomexicana (New Mexico scorpionweed), powdered root mixed with water and used for rashes.
- Phaseolus angustissimus (slimleaf bean), crushed leaves, blossoms and powdered root rubbed on a child's body as a strengthener.
- Phaseolus vulgaris (kidney bean), beans boiled and fried or crushed, boiled beans mixed with mush, baked in corn husks & used for food.
- Phoradendron juniperinum (juniper mistletoe), infusion of whole plant used for stomachaches. Compound infusion of plant taken to promote muscular relaxation at birth. Simple or compound infusion of twigs taken after childbirth to stop blood flow.
- Physalis hederifolia, var fendleri (Fendler's groundcherry), fruit boiled in small quantities of water, crushed and used as a condiment.
- Physalis longifolia (longleaf groundcherry), berries boiled, ground in a mortar with raw onions, chile and coriander seeds and used for food.
- Psoralidium lanceolatum (lemon scurfpea), fresh flower eaten for stomachaches.
- Psoralidium tenuiflorum (slimleaf scurfpea), poultice of moistened leaves applied to any body part for purification.

== R ==
- Ratibida columnifera (upright prairie coneflower), infusion of whole plant taken as an emetic.
- Rhus trilobata (skunkbush sumac), stems with the bark removed used in making baskets.
- Ribes cereum var. pedicellare (whiskey currant), berries used as food, and leaves eaten with uncooked mutton fat or deer fat.
- Rorippa sinuata (spreading yellowcress), infusion of plant used as a wash and smoke from blossoms used for inflamed eyes.
- Rumex crispus (curly dock), poultice of powdered root applied to sores, rashes and skin infections, and infusion of root used for athlete's foot. Note: This plant is not native to the Americas, and was introduced.
- Rumex salicifolius var. mexicanus (Mexican dock), strong infusion of root made and given to women by their husbands to help them to become pregnant. Ground root or infusion taken for sore throat, especially by sword swallower.

== S ==
- Salix exigua (sandbar willow), infusion of bark taken for coughs and sore throats.
- Symphyotrichum falcatum var. commutatum (cluster aster), the ground blossoms are mixed with yucca suds and used to wash newborn infants to make their hair grow and strengthen them.
- Symphyotrichum lanceolatum var. hesperium (siskiyou aster), a decoction of which is used to dress arrow or bullet wounds. The dried, pulverized plant is used for abrasions from ceremonial masks, and smoke from crushed blossoms is inhaled to treat nosebleed.

== T ==
- Tetraneuris scaposa (stemmy hymenoxys), an infusion of which is used as an eyewash. It is not for people with a "bad heart".

== V ==
- Verbascum thapsus (common mullein), a poultice of powdered root is applied to sores, rashes and skin infections. An infusion of the root is also used to treat athlete's foot. Note: This plant is not native to the Americas, and was introduced.

== X ==
- Xanthium strumarium var. canadense (Canada cockleburr), the chewed seeds are rubbed onto the body before the cactus ceremony to protect it from vines. A compound poultice of seeds is applied to wounds or used to remove splinters. The seeds are also ground, mixed with cornmeal, made into cakes, and steamed for food.

== Y ==
- Yucca glauca (small soapweed), seed pods boiled and used for food. Leaves are made into brushes & used for decorating pottery, ceremonial masks, altars and other objects. Leaves are also soaked in water to soften them and made into rope by knotting them together. Dried leaves are split, plaited and made into water-carrying head pads. Leaves are also used for making mats, cincture pads and other articles. The peeled roots pounded, made into suds and used for washing the head, wool garments and blankets.

== Z ==
- Zinnia grandiflora (Rocky Mountain zinnia), applied in a poultice to bruises, cold infusion of blossoms used as an eyewash, and smoke from powdered plant inhaled in sweatbath for fever.

== Bibliography ==
- Bell, Willis H. & Edward F. Castetter (1941). "Ethnobiological studies in the Southwest VII. The utilization of yucca, sotol and beargrass by the aborigines in the American Southwest". University of New Mexico Bulletin. 5 (5): 1–74.
- Castetter, Edward F. (1935). "Ethnobiological studies in the American Southwest I. Uncultivated native plants used as sources of food". University of New Mexico Bulletin. 4 (1): 1–44.
- Camazine, Scott & Robert A. Bye (1980). "A study of the medical ethnobotany of the Zuni Indians of New Mexico". Journal of Ethnopharmacology. 2 (4): 365–388. doi:10.1016/S0378-8741(80)81017-8. PMID 6893476.
- Stevenson, Matilda Coxe (1915). Ethnobotany of the Zuni Indians. SI-BAE Annual Report #30.
