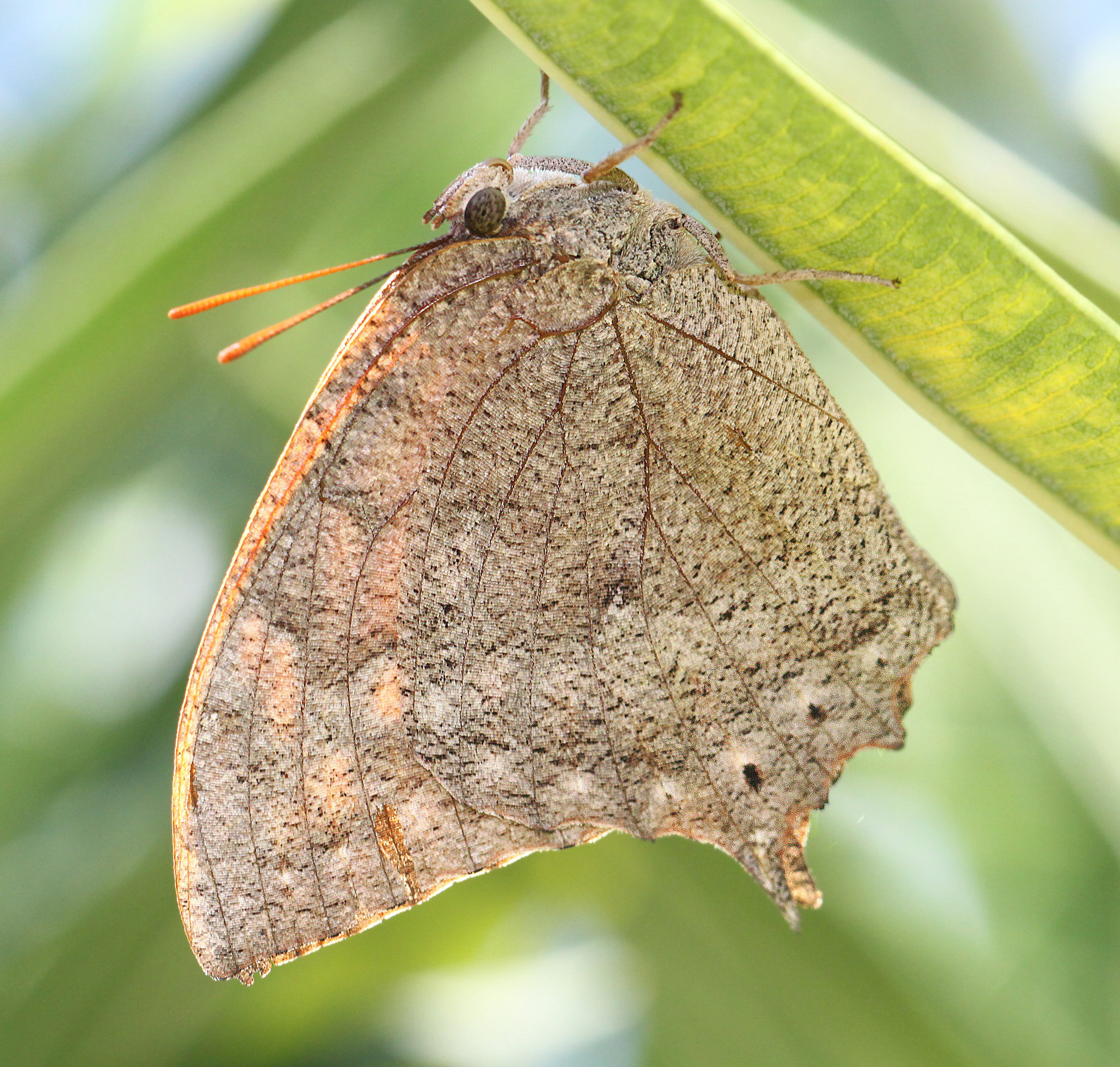
- Anaea aidea

Scientific classification
- Kingdom: Animalia
- Phylum: Arthropoda
- Clade: Pancrustacea
- Class: Insecta
- Order: Lepidoptera
- Family: Nymphalidae
- Tribe: Anaeini
- Genus: Anaea; Hübner, [1819]

Type species
- Papilio troglodyta Fabricius, 1775

Species
- See list

= Anaea (butterfly) =

Genus of butterflies

Anaea are a genus of charaxine butterflies in the brush-footed butterfly family Nymphalidae. The butterflies are commonly known as leafwings. Members of the genus are found throughout the United States, Central America, and the Caribbean.

The genus was described by Jacob Hübner in 1819 and formerly contained 225 different species of butterflies. Subsequent revisions to the genus have narrowed the genus to contain three species: its type species, Anaea troglodyta; Anaea aidea; and Anaea andria.

== Species ==
Photograph	Scientific name	Common name	Distribution
	Anaea aidea (Guérin-Méneville, 1844)	Tropical leafwing	Southern USA and Central America
	Anaea andria Scudder, 1875	Goatweed leafwing Goatweed butterfly	Central and Southern USA and Mexico
	Anaea troglodyta (Fabricius, 1775)	Florida leafwing Cuban red leaf butterfly	Southern Florida and Caribbean

== Taxonomy ==
Anaea was formerly considered as one of the largest butterfly genera. At its peak, it contained over 225 different species of butterflies. The genus had formerly contained almost all members of the subfamily Charaxinae found in the Neotropical realm. Eventually, several species were placed into the related genera Memphis and Fountainea. Members of the genus Memphis have been considered a separate genus from Anaea (Pelham 2008) or as a subspecies within Anaea (Caldas 1994) by different authorities. The butterfly genus was described as being "a fauna that far outstrips anything comparable elsewhere", having "commanded the admiration of even the most gold-mad conquistadores". The type species for the genus is Anaea troglodyta, described by Johan Christian Fabricius in 1775 as Papilio troglodyta in Systema entomologiae.

The genus Anaea is sometimes recognized as a monotypic genus consisting solely of Anaea troglodyta. This monotypic interpretation is in line with Gerardo Lamas' 2004 description in Checklist of Neotropical Butterflies : Part 4A Hesperioidea - Papilionoidea. The Integrated Taxonomic Information System, citing Johnathan P. Pelham's 2008 A catalogue of the butterflies of the United States and Canada with a complete bibliography of the descriptive and systematic literature instead lists three species: A. aidea, A. andria, and A. troglodyta. Pelham's three-species classification is accepted by BugGuide and Butterflies of America.

== Life history ==
The genus Anaea is associated with its host plant being members of the genus Croton. A. aidea feeds on Croton humilis, A. andria feeds on Croton monanthogynus and Croton texensis, and A. troglodyta feeds on Croton cascarilla.

The butterflies show variable seasonal forms depending on emergence, with both wet (winter) and dry (summer) season forms.

== Distribution ==
The butterflies are found throughout the Central and Southern portions of North America.

Anaea aidea is found from Costa Rica and north into Mexico. It can stray north into the United States, as far north as the state of Kansas.

Anaea andria is found throughout the Eastern and Southern United States, in the states of Alabama, Arizona, Arkansas, Colorado, Florida, Georgia, Illinois, Indiana, Iowa, Louisiana, Nebraska, Michigan, Mississippi, Missouri, New Mexico, North Carolina, Ohio, Oklahoma, South Carolina, South Dakota, Tennessee, Texas, Virginia, and Wyoming. It can stray into Mexico and Southern Canada (Ontario). It is listed as "Critically Imperiled" in Virginia, and "Vulnerable" in Indiana according to NatureServe's conservation status.

Anaea troglodyta is found on the southern portion of peninsular Florida and the Florida Keys, as well as most of the Caribbean, including: the Cayman Islands, Cuba, Hispaniola, Lesser Antilles, Puerto Rico, and the Virgin Islands. NatureServe and the National Park Service lists subspecies floridalis as being restricted to Long Pine Key in Everglades National Park.
