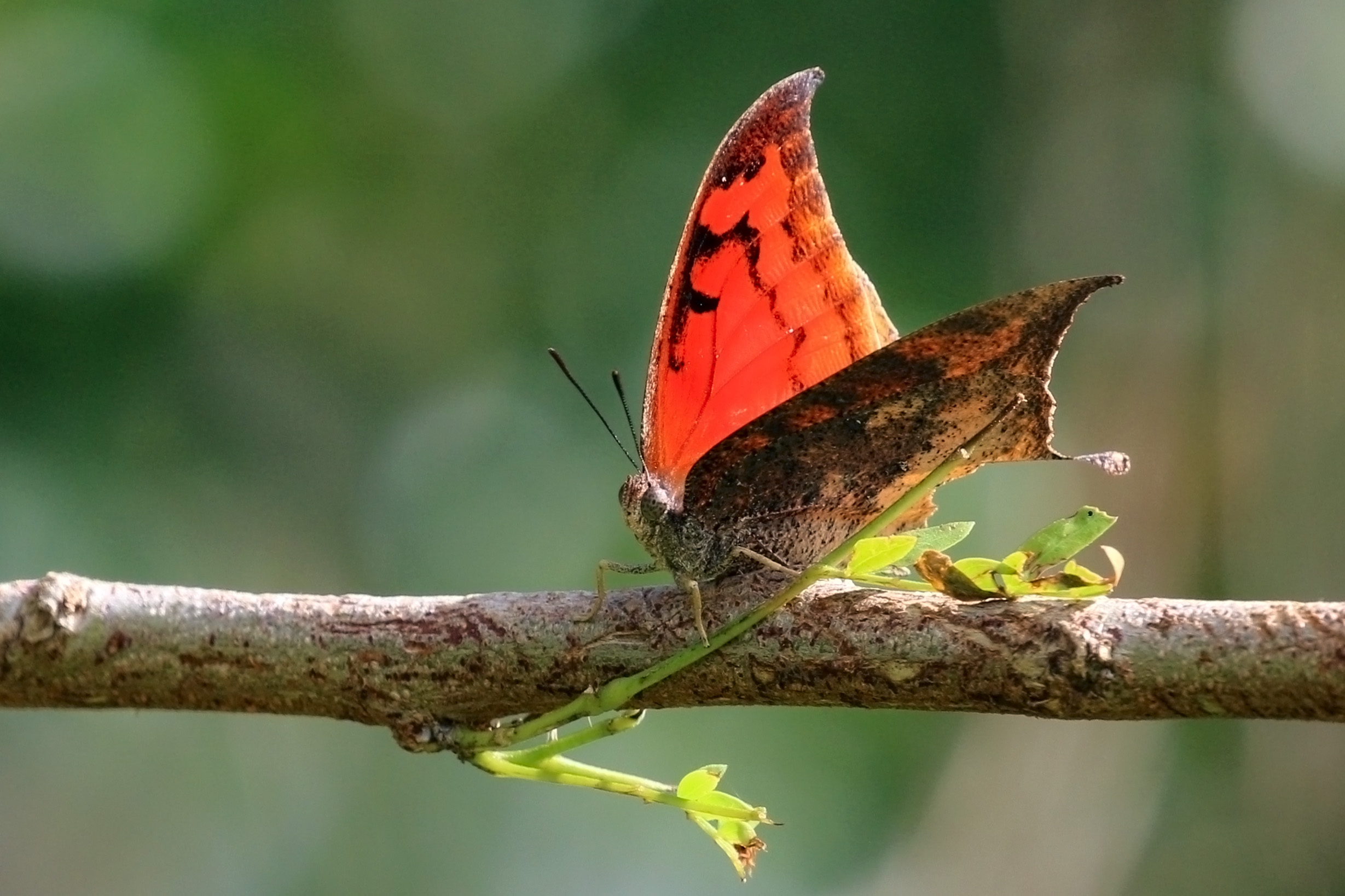
- Cuban red leaf A. t. cubana male, Grand Cayman
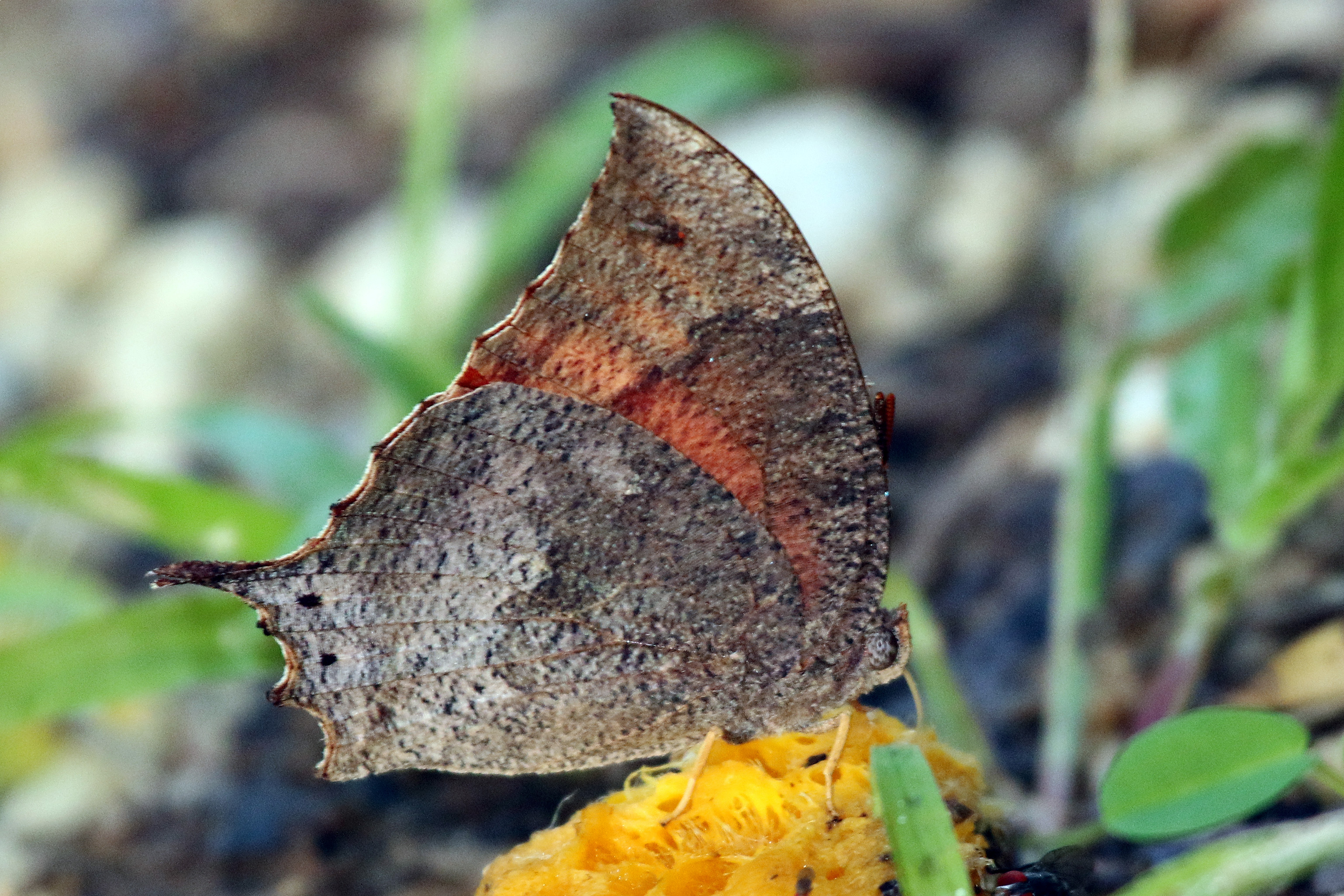
- Jamaican tropical leafwing, A. t. portia Jamaica

Scientific classification
- Domain: Eukaryota
- Kingdom: Animalia
- Phylum: Arthropoda
- Class: Insecta
- Order: Lepidoptera
- Family: Nymphalidae
- Genus: Anaea
- Species: A. troglodyta

Binomial name
- Anaea troglodyta (Fabricius, 1775)

Synonyms
- Anaea floridalis (Johnson & Comstock, 1941); Anaea floraesta Johnson & Comstock, 1941; Papilio troglodyta Fabricius, 1775

= Anaea troglodyta =

Species of butterfly

Anaea troglodyta, the Florida leafwing, Portia or Florida goatweed butterfly, is a butterfly of the family Nymphalidae. It is found in southern Florida and on many islands of the Caribbean. In Jamaica, it is known as the Jamaican tropical leafwing and in the Cayman Islands and Cuba it is known as the Cuban red leaf.

The wingspan is 76–90 millimetres (3.0–3.5 in). Adults are on wing from October to April (dry-season form) and from May to October (wet-season form).

The larvae feed on Croton cascarilla and Croton linearis. Adults feed on rotting fruit, dung and fluids.

Although over 230 species have been included in the genus Anaea, Gerardo Lamas (2004) considers all Anaea populations to represent a single species, Anaea troglodyta (Fabricius 1775).

== Subspecies ==
Some authors list the following subspecies, while others treat (most) as valid species or even synonyms:

- Anaea troglodyta troglodyte
- Anaea troglodyta astina (described from St. Thomas)
- Anaea troglodyta aidea (Arizona, Mexico to Costa Rica)
- Anaea troglodyta andria (Mexico, from Texas to Nebraska and to West Virginia to Georgia and Florida)
- Anaea troglodyta cubana (Cuba, Grand Cayman)
- Anaea troglodyta borinquenalis (Puerto Rico)
- Anaea troglodyta minor (St. Kitts, Antigua, Montserrat, St. Christopher, Guadeloupe)
- Anaea troglodyta floridalis (Florida)
- Anaea troglodyta portia (Jamaica)
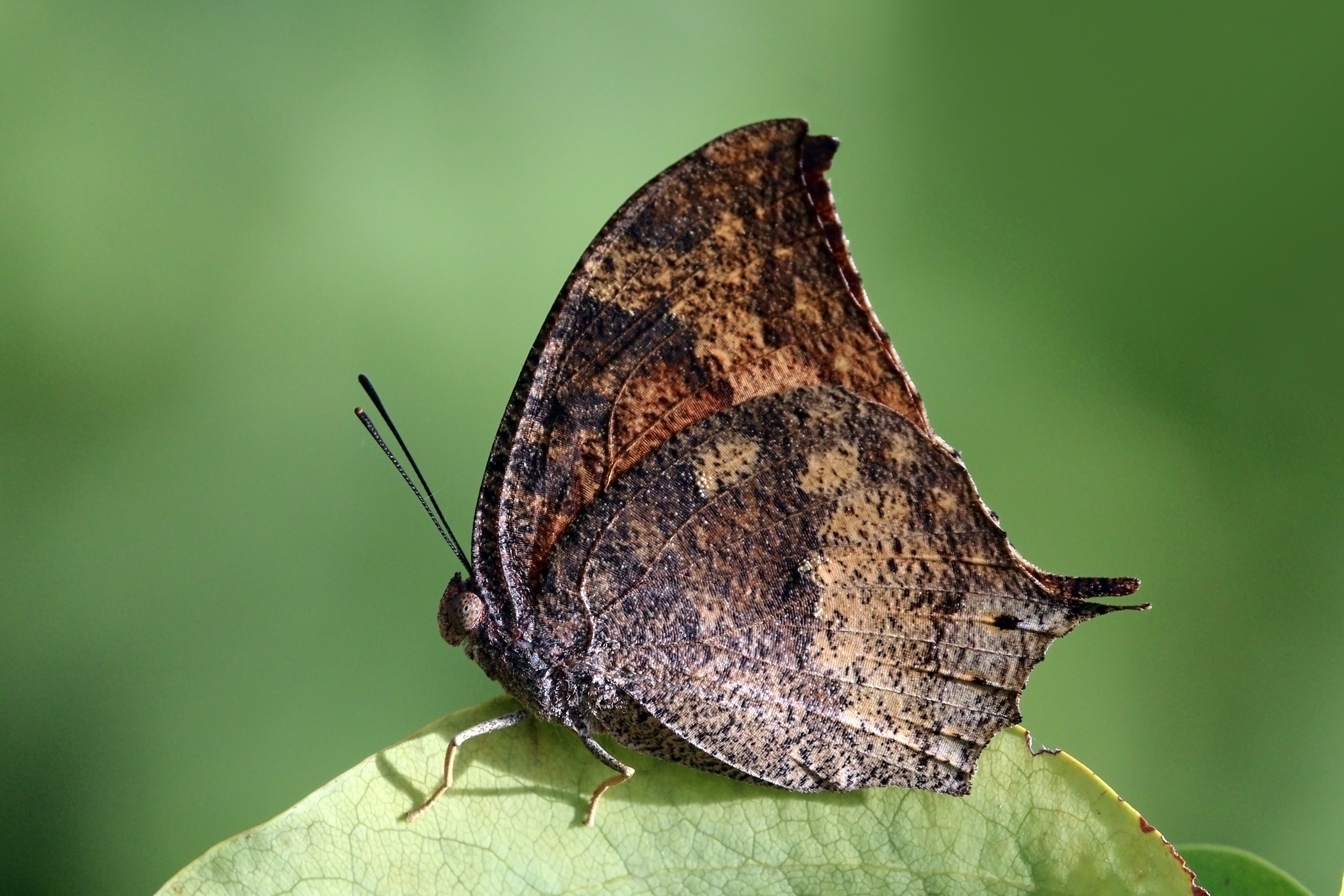
A. t. cubana, underside

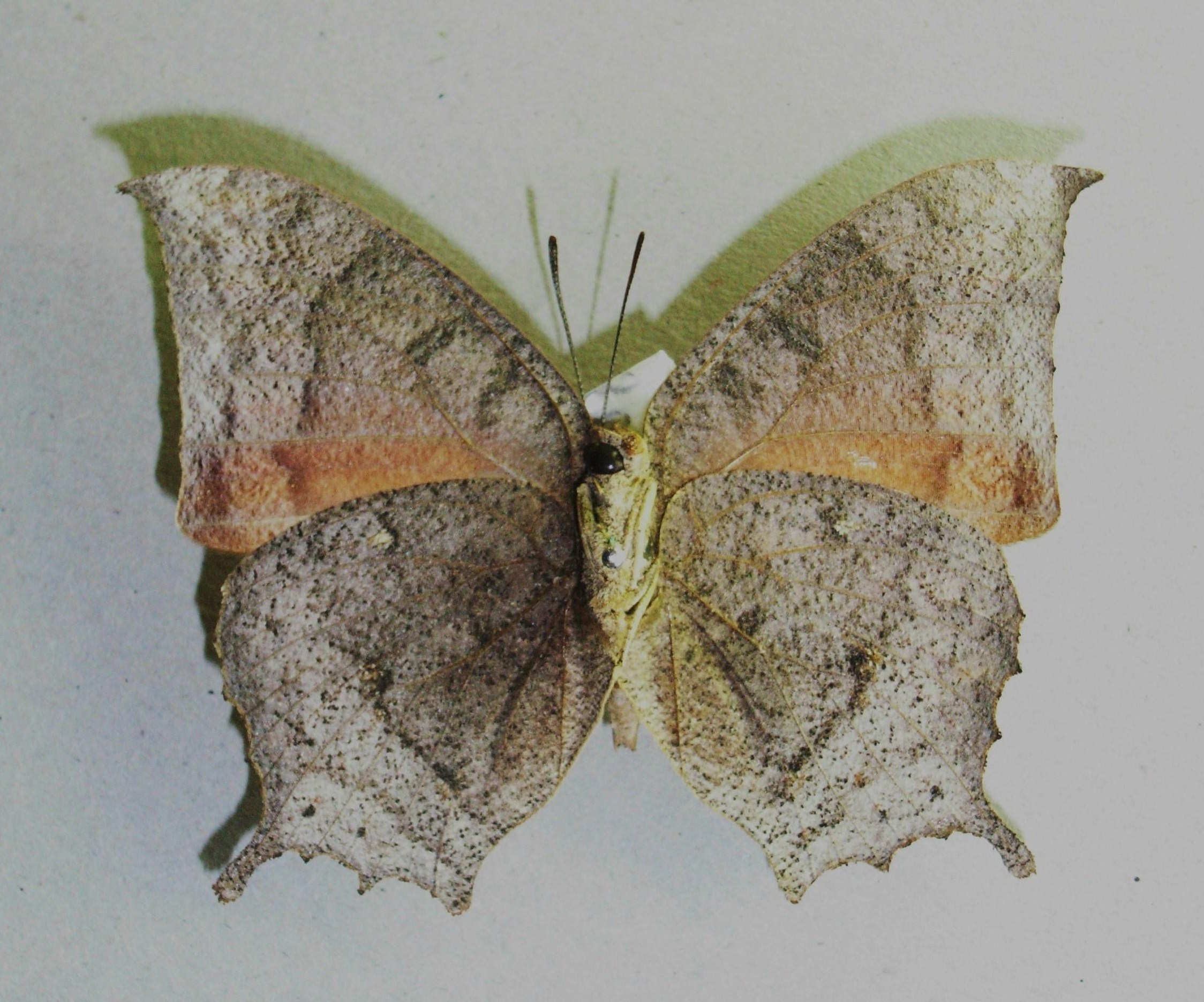
Anaea troglodyta (Fabricius, 1775), underside

== See also ==
- Species problem
- Superspecies
