= Pepperbush =

Pepperbush is a common name for several plants and may refer to:

- Clethra, a widely distributed genus with several species known as pepperbush or sweetpepperbush
- Croton humilis, a species native to the southern United States, Mexico and the Caribbean
