= Corycia (Lepidoptera) =

Corycia is a synonym of several genera of Lepidoptera (butterflies and moths).

- Corycia Hübner, 1825 is a synonym of Anaea Hübner, 1819 in the family Nymphalidae
- Corycia Hübner, 1823 is a synonym of Eudocima Billberg, 1820 in the family Erebidae
- Corycia Duponchel, 1829 is a synonym of Lomographa Hübner, [1825] in the family Geometridae
- Corycia Hübner, [1825] is a synonym of Memphis Hübner, [1819] in the family Nymphalidae
