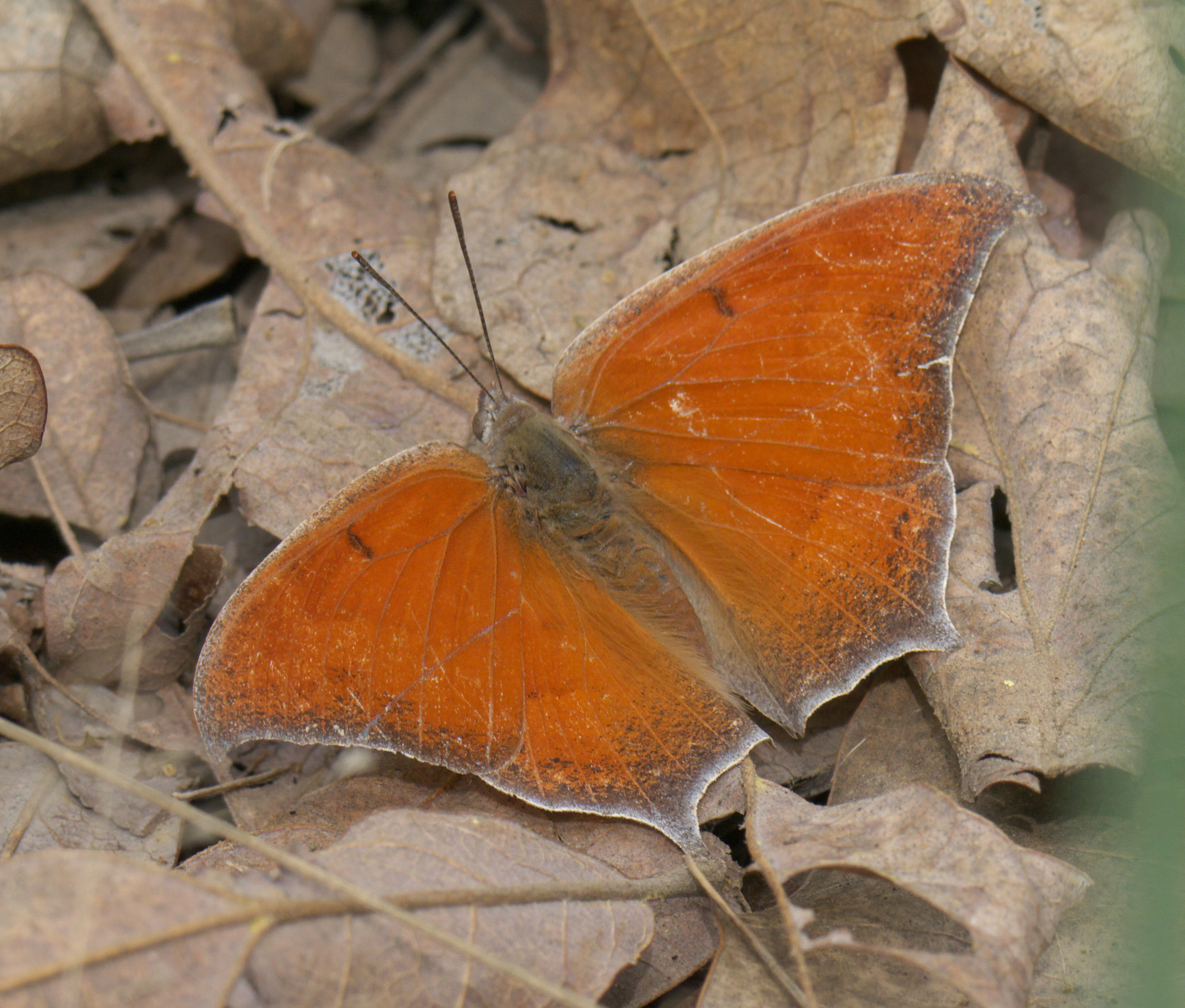

Conservation status
- Apparently Secure (NatureServe)

Scientific classification
- Kingdom: Animalia
- Phylum: Arthropoda
- Clade: Pancrustacea
- Class: Insecta
- Order: Lepidoptera
- Family: Nymphalidae
- Tribe: Anaeini
- Genus: Anaea
- Species: A. andria

Binomial name
- Anaea andria Scudder, 1875

= Anaea andria =

Species of butterfly

Anaea andria, known generally as the goatweed leafwing or goatweed butterfly, is a species of leafwing in the butterfly family Nymphalidae. It is found in North America.

Host plants include goatweed, Texas croton, and prairie tea; all in the spurge family Euphorbiaceae.

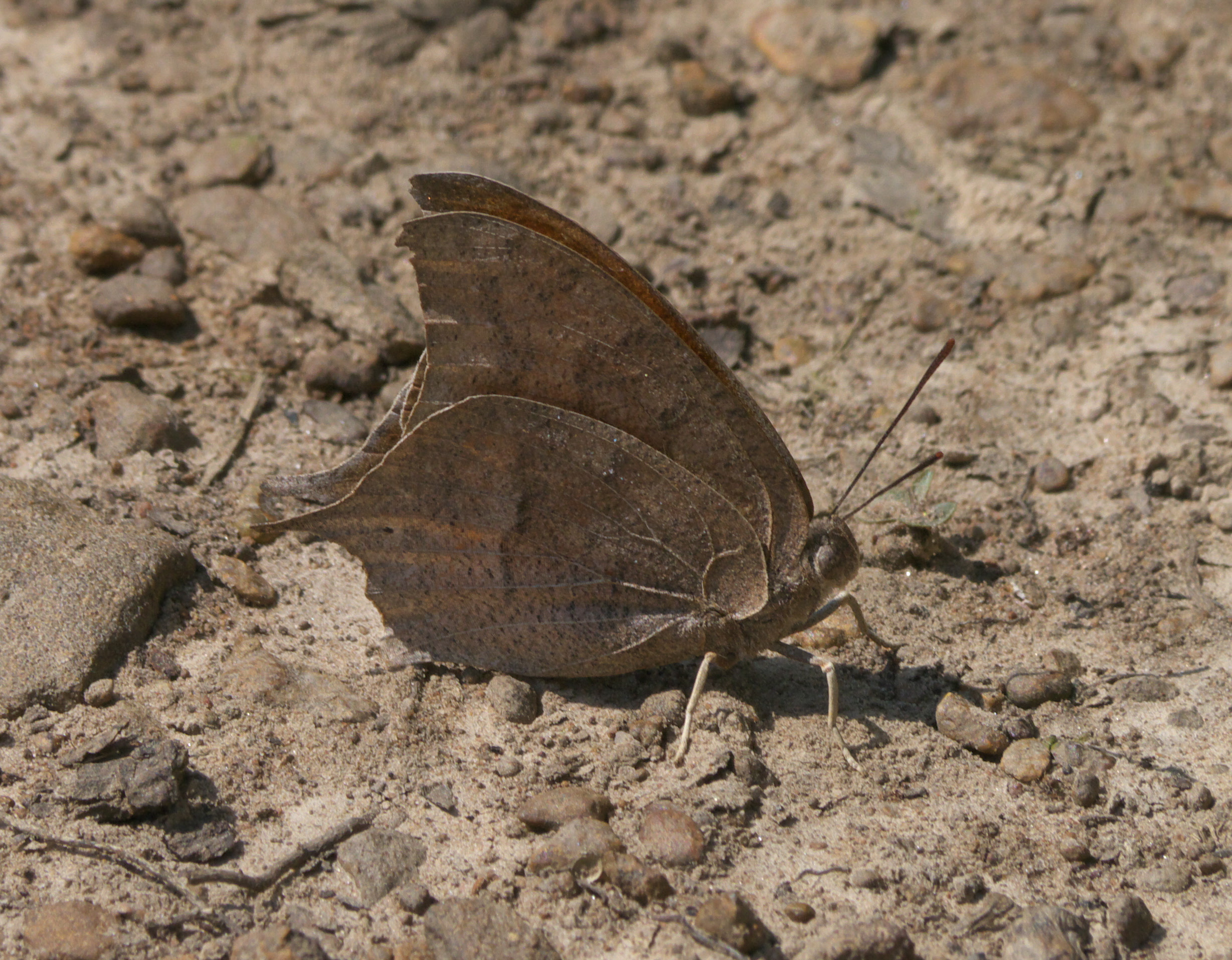
Goatweed leafwing, Anaea andria

== Subspecies ==
These two subspecies belong to the species Anaea andria:

- Anaea andria andria
- Anaea andria andriaesta Johnson & Comstock, 1941
