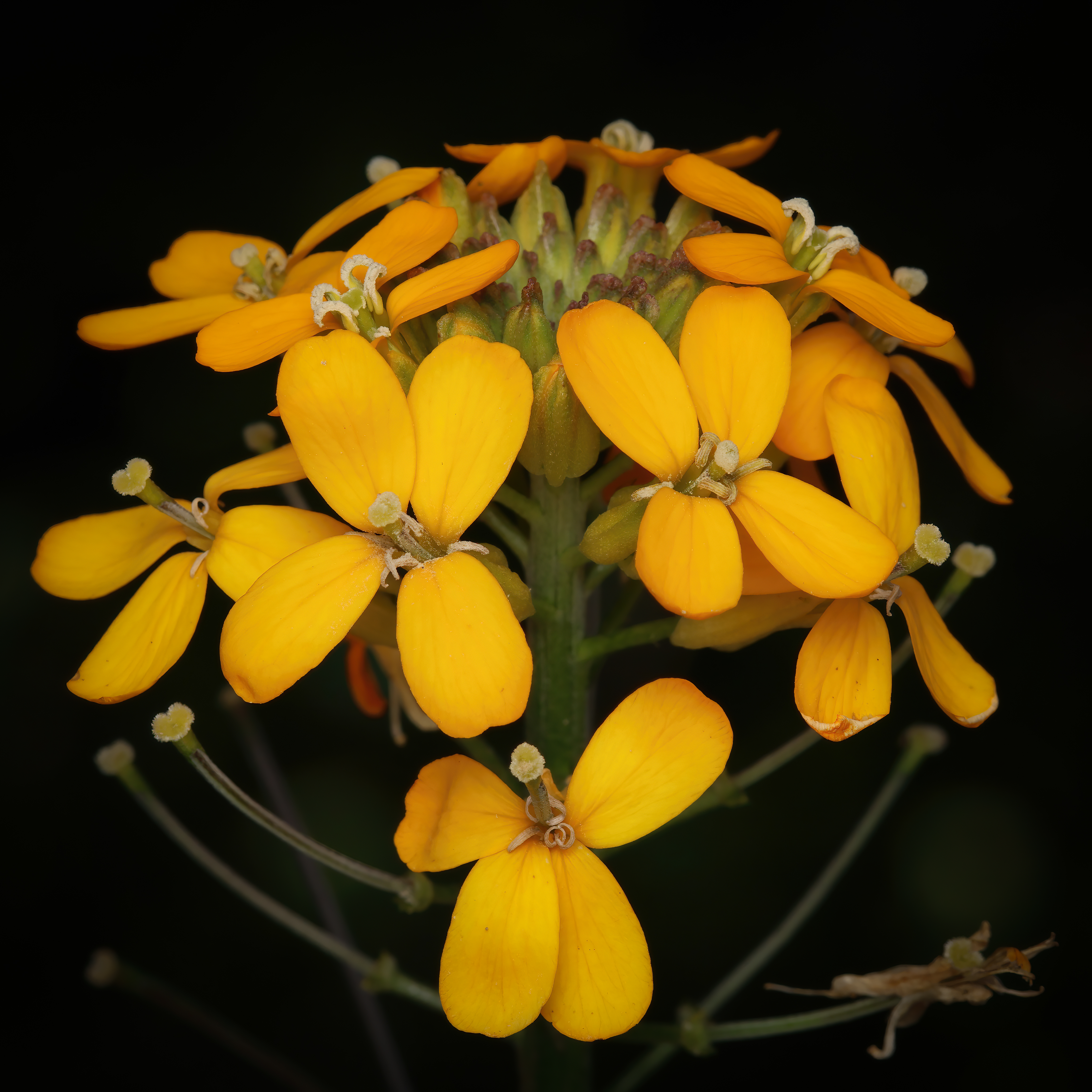
- Erysimum capitatum var. lompocense near Vandenburg Village

Conservation status
- Secure (NatureServe)

Scientific classification
- Kingdom: Plantae
- Clade: Embryophytes
- Clade: Tracheophytes
- Clade: Spermatophytes
- Clade: Angiosperms
- Clade: Eudicots
- Clade: Rosids
- Order: Brassicales
- Family: Brassicaceae
- Genus: Erysimum
- Species: E. capitatum

Binomial name
- Erysimum capitatum (Dougl. ex Hook.) Greene

= Erysimum capitatum =

Species of flowering plant

Erysimum capitatum is a species of wallflower known commonly as the sanddune wallflower, western wallflower, or prairie rocket.

This species can be found in regions across North America, from the Great Lakes to the West Coast of the United States. Some varieties have an extremely narrow distribution, especially those endemic to California.

== Description ==
Erysimum capitatum is a mustard-like plant with thin, erect stems growing from a basal rosette and topped with dense bunches of variably colored flowers. Flowers are most typically bright golden, yellow, or tangerine-colored, but plants in some populations may have red, white or purple flowers. Each flower has four flat petals. Seed pods are nearly parallel to the stem. It is a biennial herb and its native habitats include plains, foothills, and high elevation coniferous forests. The Latin specific epithet capitatum refers to the head-like shape of the flower cluster or the knobby stigma.

=== Subspecies ===
There are varieties or subspecies of this plant. Some are listed endangered species. For example, Erysimum capitatum var. angustatum, the Contra Costa wallflower, is an endangered plant in the state of California. The varieties include:

- E. c. var. angustatum—Contra Costa wallflower; endemic to California, endangered species.
- E. c. var. bealianum—Sanddune wallflower; Mojave Desert, California.
- E. c. var. capitatum—Western wallflower; flowers from May to July, widely distributed across Colorado and Utah.
- E. c. var. lompocense—San Luis Obispo wallflower; endemic to California.
- E. c. var. perenne (syn: Erysimum perenne)—Sanddune wallflower; endemic to California.
- E. c. var. purshii—Pursh's wallflower; Western United States.

== Pollinators ==
Little information on this wallflower species relationship with pollinators exists. Andrew Moldenke studied a population of Erysimum capitatum var. perenne in Subalpine Talus Fell Scree of the Timberland Hall Area (2,900–3,500 metres (9,500–11,500 ft) elevation). He observed 13 species of flower visitors, although over 80% of the visits to the flowers were performed by two ant species, Formica lasioides and one from the Formica fusca group.

== Cultivation ==
Erysimum capitatum is cultivated as an ornamental plant. It is an attractive perennial, can be variable in appearance, and is used in butterfly gardening.

== Uses ==
In Zuni ethnobotany, an infusion of the whole plant is used externally for muscle aches. The flower and the fruit are eaten as an emetic for stomach aches.

== Gallery ==
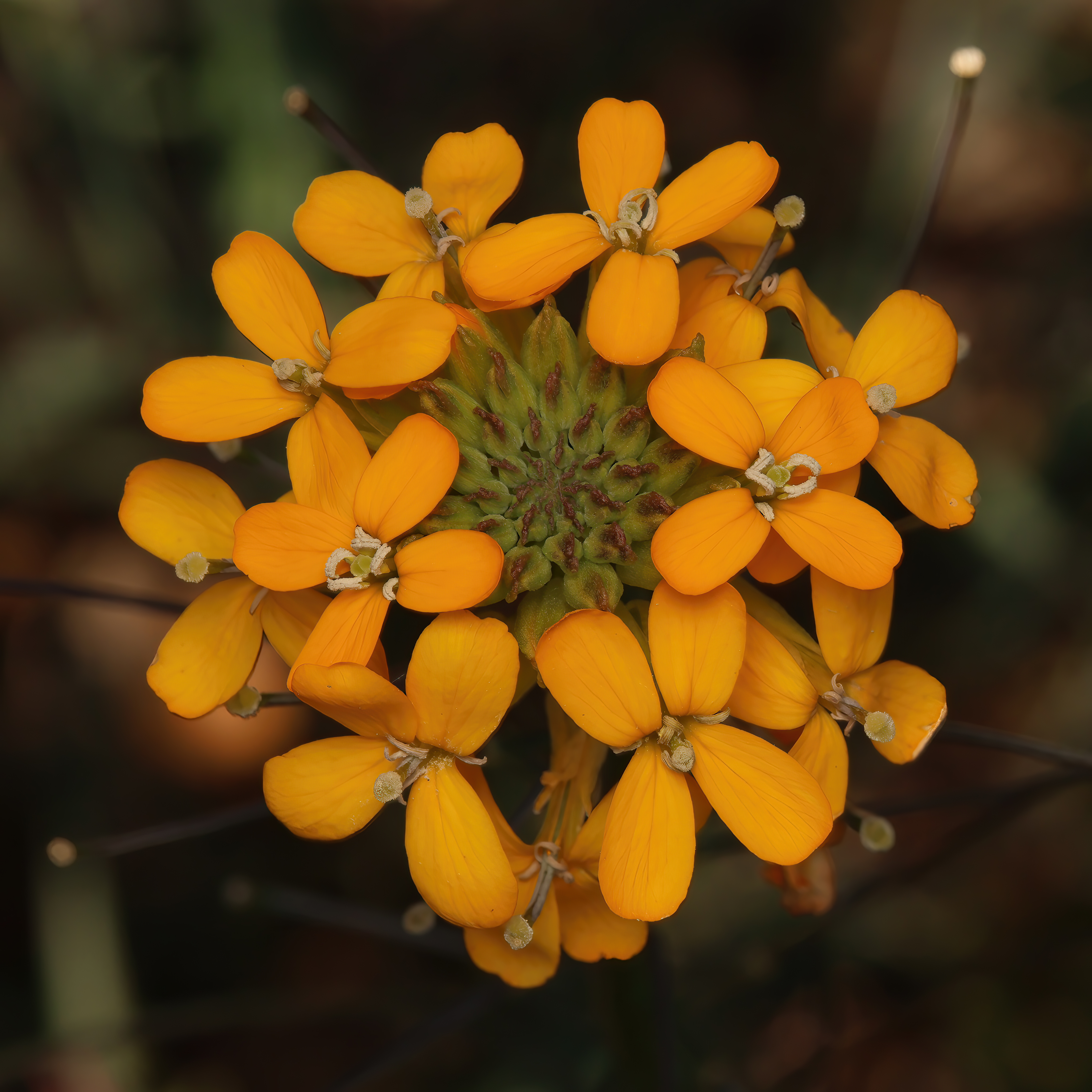
Erysimum capitatum var. lompocense

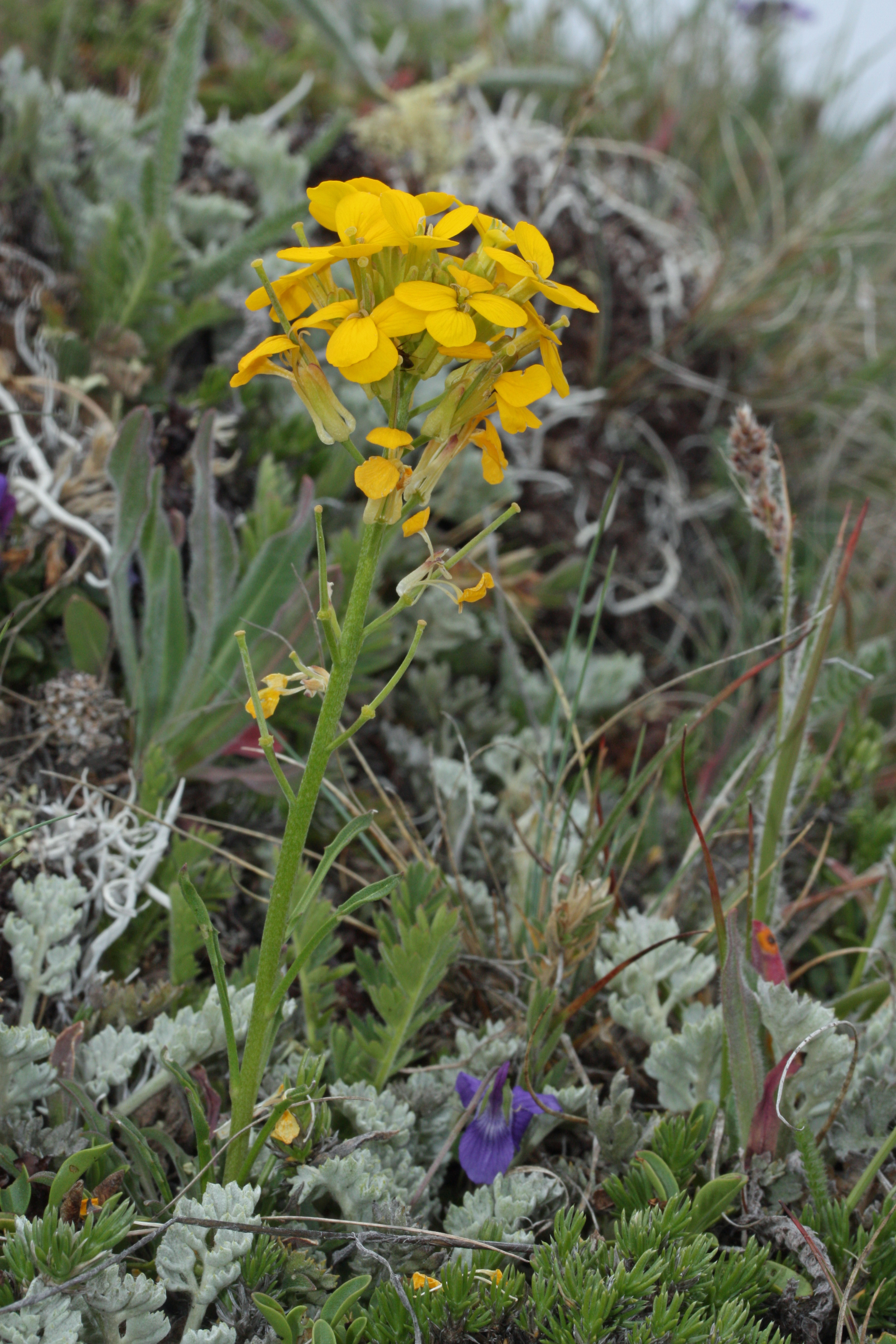
Erysimum capitatum var. capitatum, Olympic National Park, Washington.
