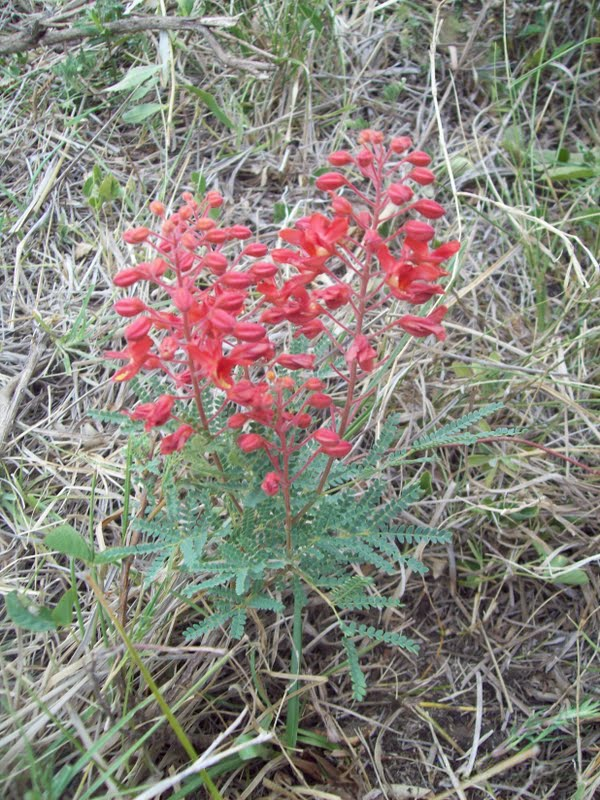
- Pomaria rubicunda

Scientific classification
- Kingdom: Plantae
- Clade: Tracheophytes
- Clade: Angiosperms
- Clade: Eudicots
- Clade: Rosids
- Order: Fabales
- Family: Fabaceae
- Subfamily: Caesalpinioideae
- Tribe: Caesalpinieae
- Genus: Pomaria; Cav. (1799)

Type species
- Pomaria glandulosa Cav. 1799

Species
- 16; see text

Synonyms
- Cladotrichium Vogel (1837); Melanosticta DC. (1825)

= Pomaria (plant) =

Genus of legumes

Pomaria is a genus of flowering plants in the legume family, Fabaceae. It includes 16 species of shrubs and perennial herbs native to North America (9 species, ranging from the central United States to southern Mexico), South America (4 species, ranging from southern Brazil to Paraguay and northern Argentina), and southern Africa (3 species in Namibia, Botswana, and South Africa). Typical habitats include drier subtropical grasslands and wooded grasslands, often on limestone, and degraded areas. It belongs to tribe Caesalpinieae of subfamily Caesalpinioideae.

== Species ==
Pomaria comprises the following species:

- Pomaria austrotexana B.B.Simpson
- Pomaria brachycarpa (A.Gray) B.B.Simpson—Broadpad nicker
- Pomaria burchellii (DC.) B.B.Simpson & G.P.Lewis
- Pomaria canescens (Fisher) B.B.Simpson
- Pomaria fruticosa (S. Watson) B.B.Simpson
- Pomaria glandulosa Cav.
- Pomaria jamesii (Torr. & A.Gray) Walp.
- Pomaria lactea (Schinz) B.B.Simpson & G.P.Lewis
- Pomaria melanosticta S.Schauer—Parry's holdback
- Pomaria multijuga (S.Watson) B.B.Simpson
- Pomaria parviflora (Micheli) B.B.Simpson & G.P.Lewis
- Pomaria pilosa (Vogel) B.B.Simpson & G.P.Lewis
- Pomaria rubicunda (Vogel) B.B.Simpson & G.P.Lewis
  - var. rubicunda (Vogel) B.B.Simpson & G.P.Lewis
  - var. hauthalii (Harms) B.B.Simpson & G.P.Lewis
- Pomaria sandersonii (Harv.) B.B.Simpson & G.P.Lewis
- Pomaria stipularis (Vogel) B.B.Simpson & G.P.Lewis
- Pomaria wootonii (Britton) B.B.Simpson
