= Dimorphocarpa =

Scientific classification
- Kingdom: Plantae
- Clade: Tracheophytes
- Clade: Angiosperms
- Clade: Eudicots
- Clade: Rosids
- Order: Brassicales
- Family: Brassicaceae
- Genus: Dimorphocarpa; Rollins

Genus of plants

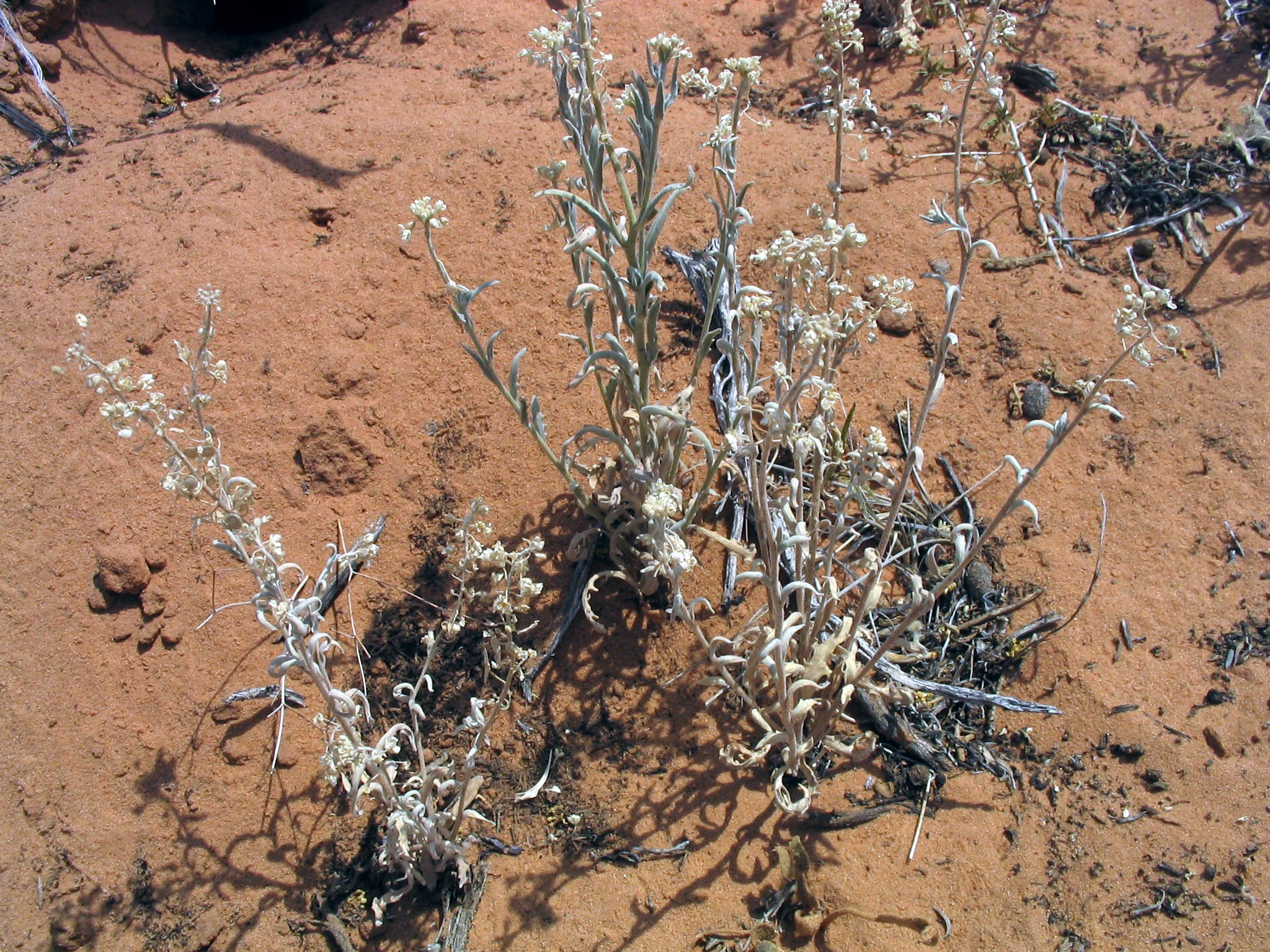
Specimen of Dimorphocarpa wislizeni, member of Dimorphocarpa genus

Dimorphocarpa is a genus of flowering plants belonging to the family Brassicaceae.

Its native range is Western and Central USA to Northern Mexico.

Species:

- Dimorphocarpa candicans (Raf.) Rollins
- Dimorphocarpa membranacea (Payson) Rollins
- Dimorphocarpa pinnatifida Rollins
- Dimorphocarpa wislizeni (Engelm.) Rollins
