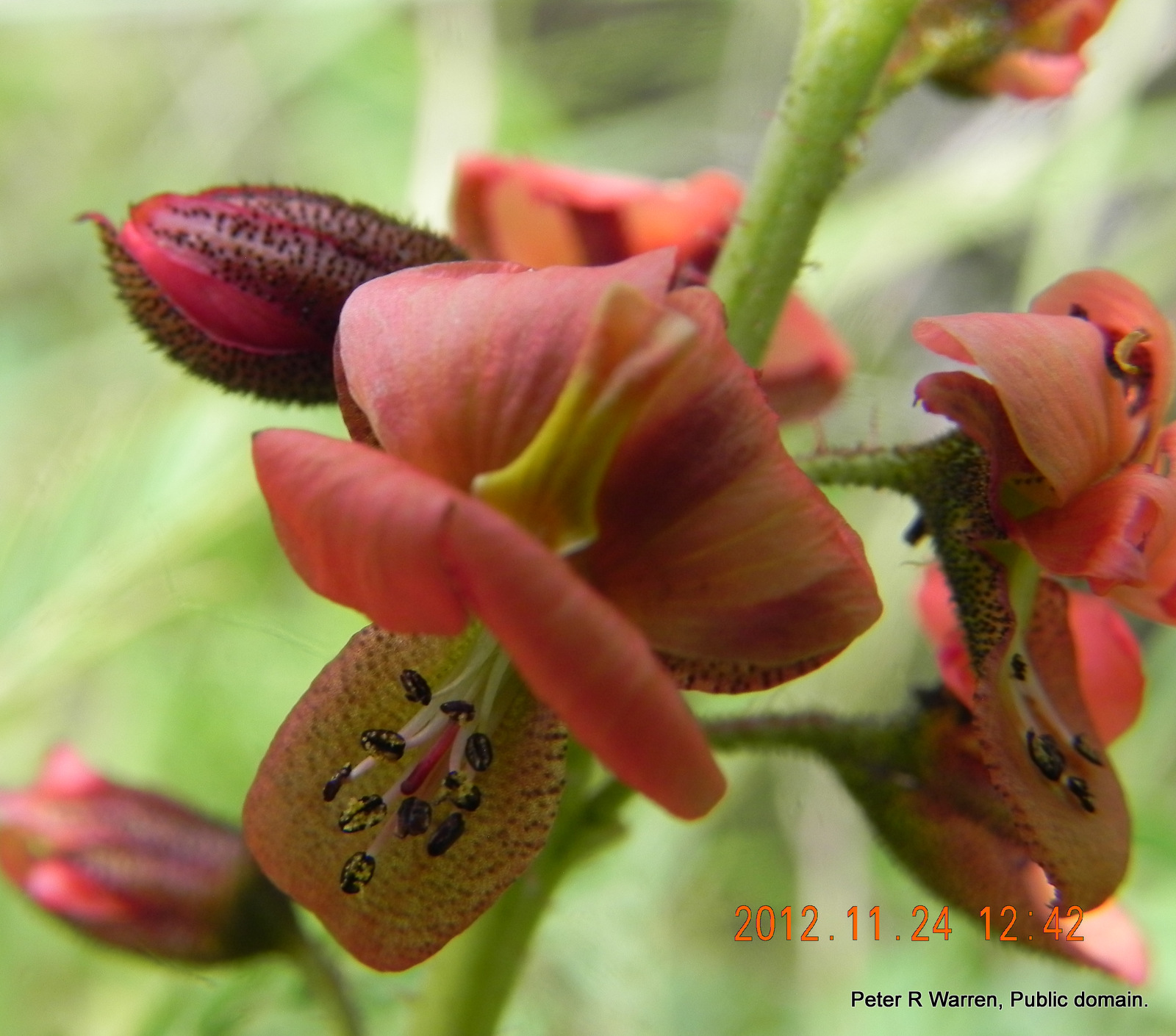

Conservation status
- Least Concern (SANBI Red List)

Scientific classification
- Kingdom: Plantae
- Clade: Tracheophytes
- Clade: Angiosperms
- Clade: Eudicots
- Clade: Rosids
- Order: Fabales
- Family: Fabaceae
- Subfamily: Caesalpinioideae
- Genus: Pomaria
- Species: P. sandersonii

Binomial name
- Pomaria sandersonii (Harv.) B.B.Simpson & G.P.Lewis

Synonyms
- List: Hoffmannseggia sandersonii (Harv.) Engl.; Melanosticta sandersonii Harv.

= Pomaria sandersonii =

Species of plant

Pomaria sandersonii is a species of plant endemic to South Africa.

== Range ==
Pomaria sandersonii is found in the Eastern Cape and KwaZulu Natal in South Africa.

== Gallery ==
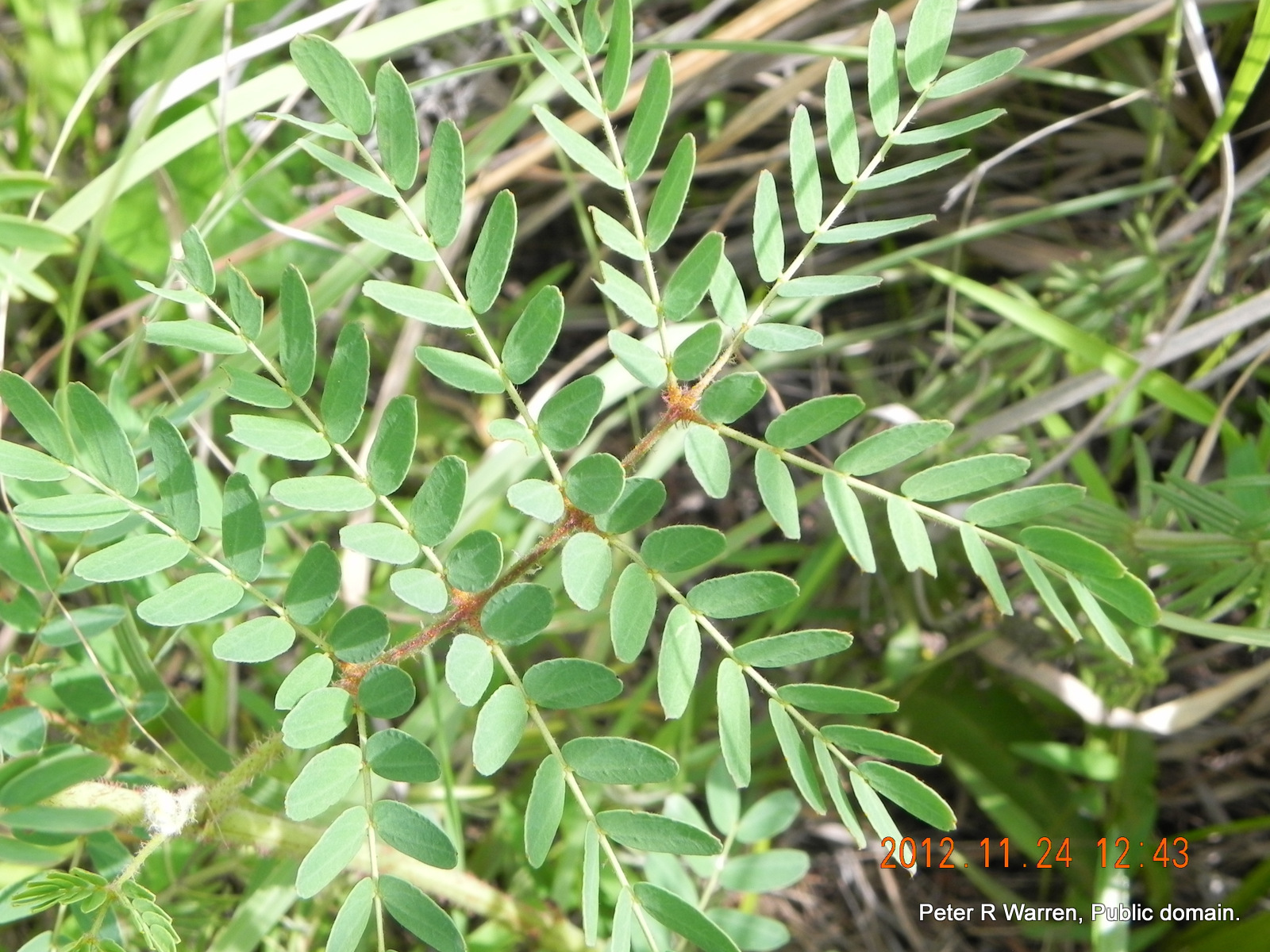
Leaves

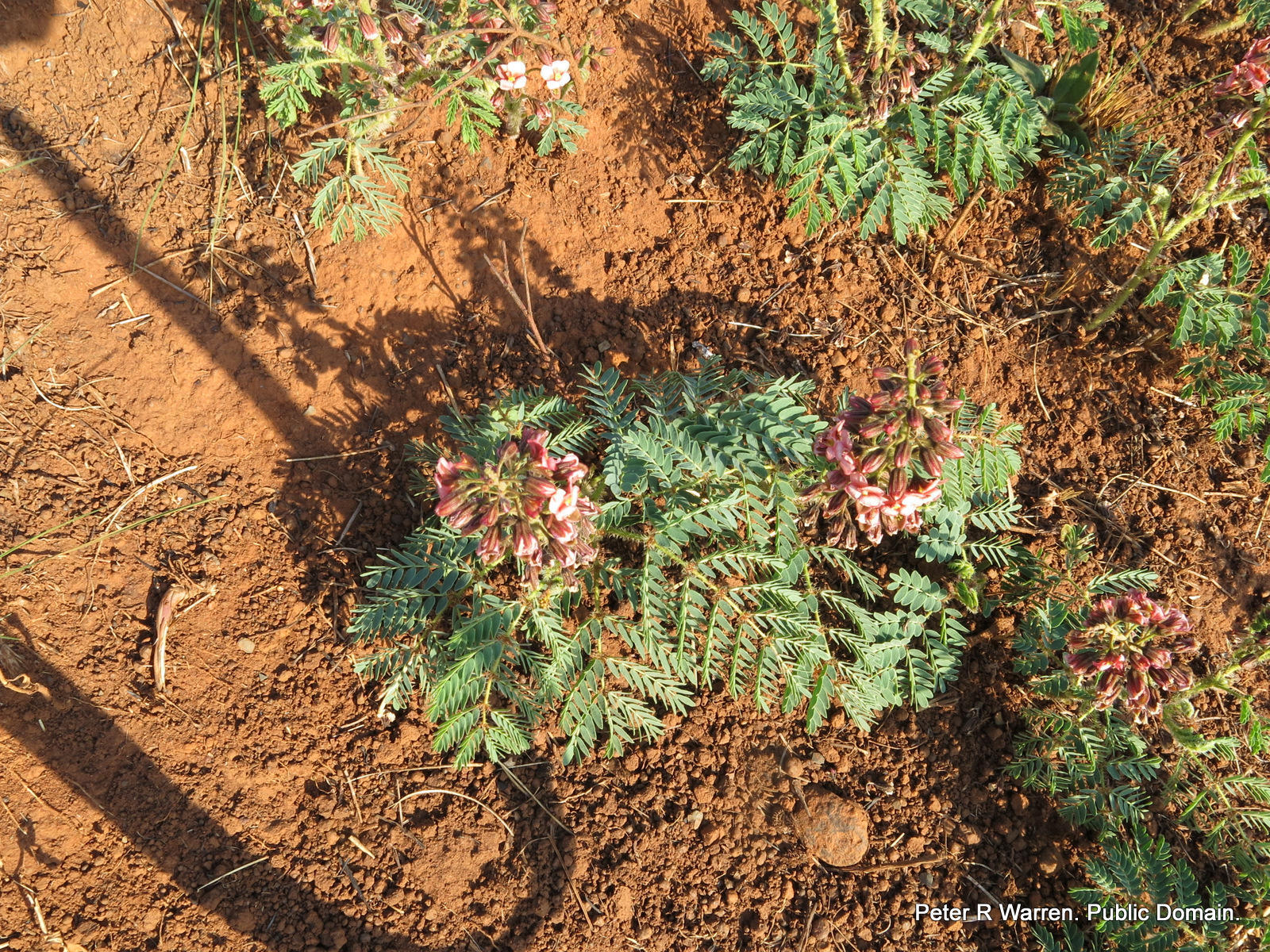
Plant
