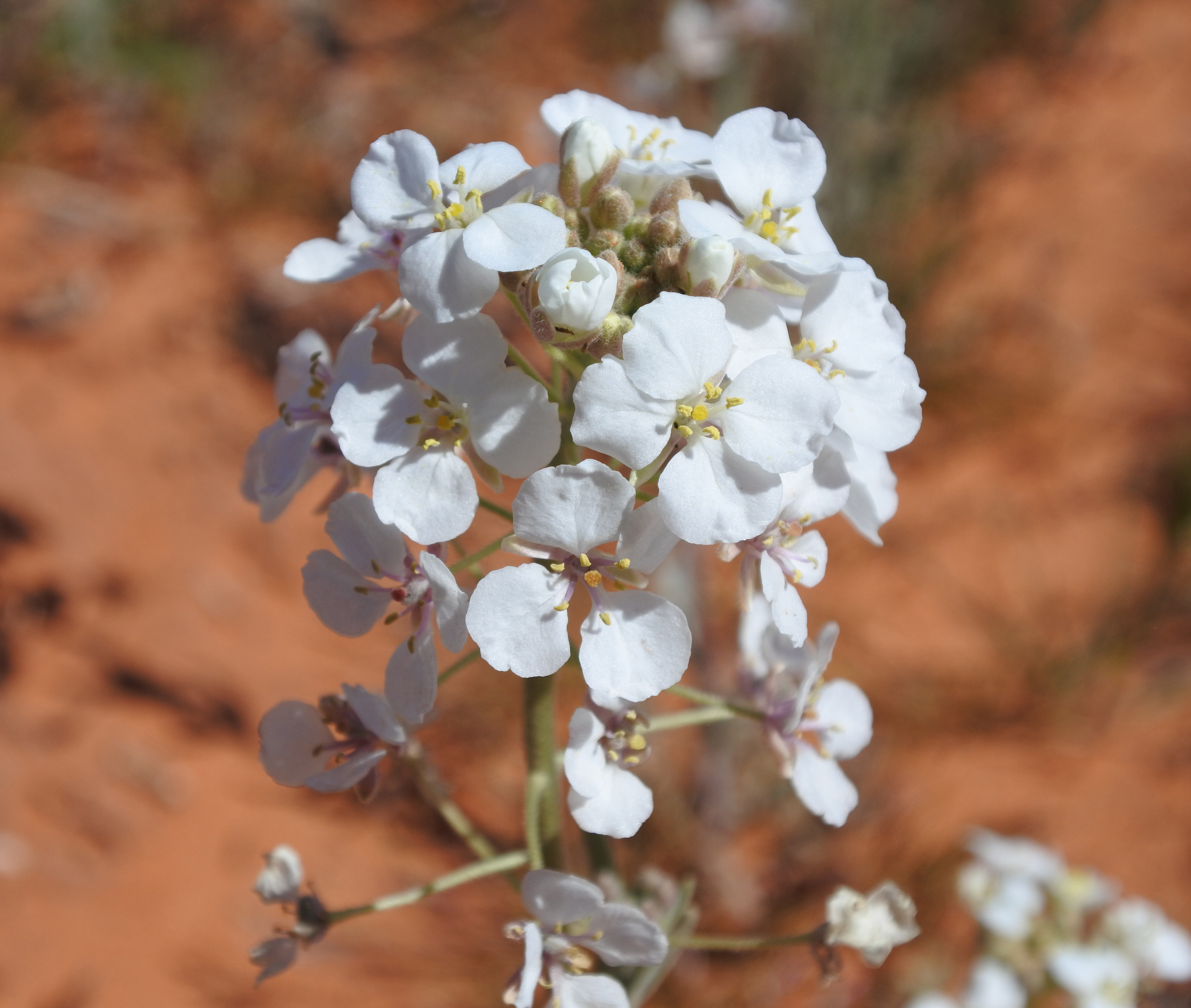

Conservation status
- Apparently Secure (NatureServe)

Scientific classification
- Kingdom: Plantae
- Clade: Tracheophytes
- Clade: Angiosperms
- Clade: Eudicots
- Clade: Rosids
- Order: Brassicales
- Family: Brassicaceae
- Genus: Dimorphocarpa
- Species: D. wislizeni

Binomial name
- Dimorphocarpa wislizeni (Engelm.) Rollins

Synonyms
- Dithyrea griffithsii Woot. & Standl. Dithyrea wislizeni Engelm. Dithyrea wislizeni var. griffithsii (Woot. & Standl.) Payson

= Dimorphocarpa wislizeni =

Species of flowering plant

Dimorphocarpa wislizeni, commonly known as spectacle pod, Wislizeni's spectaclepod, and touristplant, is a flowering plant in the mustard family native to western North America, where it occurs in the southwestern United States as far east as Oklahoma and Texas, and Baja California, Sonora, Chihuahua, and Coahuila in Mexico.

== Description ==
This species is an annual herb with a branching or unbranched stem 10 to 80 centimeters tall. The basal leaves are lance-shaped with toothed or lobed edges. Leaves higher on the stem are narrower, with less divided or smooth edges. The flowers have white or lavender petals 4 to 8 millimeters long. The fruit is a double-lobed, winged silicle that breaks in half at maturity, each lobe carrying a flat seed 2 or 3 millimeters wide.

The plant grows in sandy and sandstone substrates in desert shrubland, pinyon-juniper, and ponderosa pine associations.

The seed pods of Dimorphocarpa wislizeni are flat, green, two-lobed capsules that superficially resemble spectacles, hence the common name. This feature makes identification of Spectacle Pod easy.

== Uses ==
The Zuni people applied a warm infusion of the pulverized plant to swelling, especially the throat. A decoction of entire plant was given for delirium. An infusion of the plant was taken by men to "loosen their tongues so they may talk like fools and drunken men." The flower and fruit are eaten as an emetic for stomachaches.
