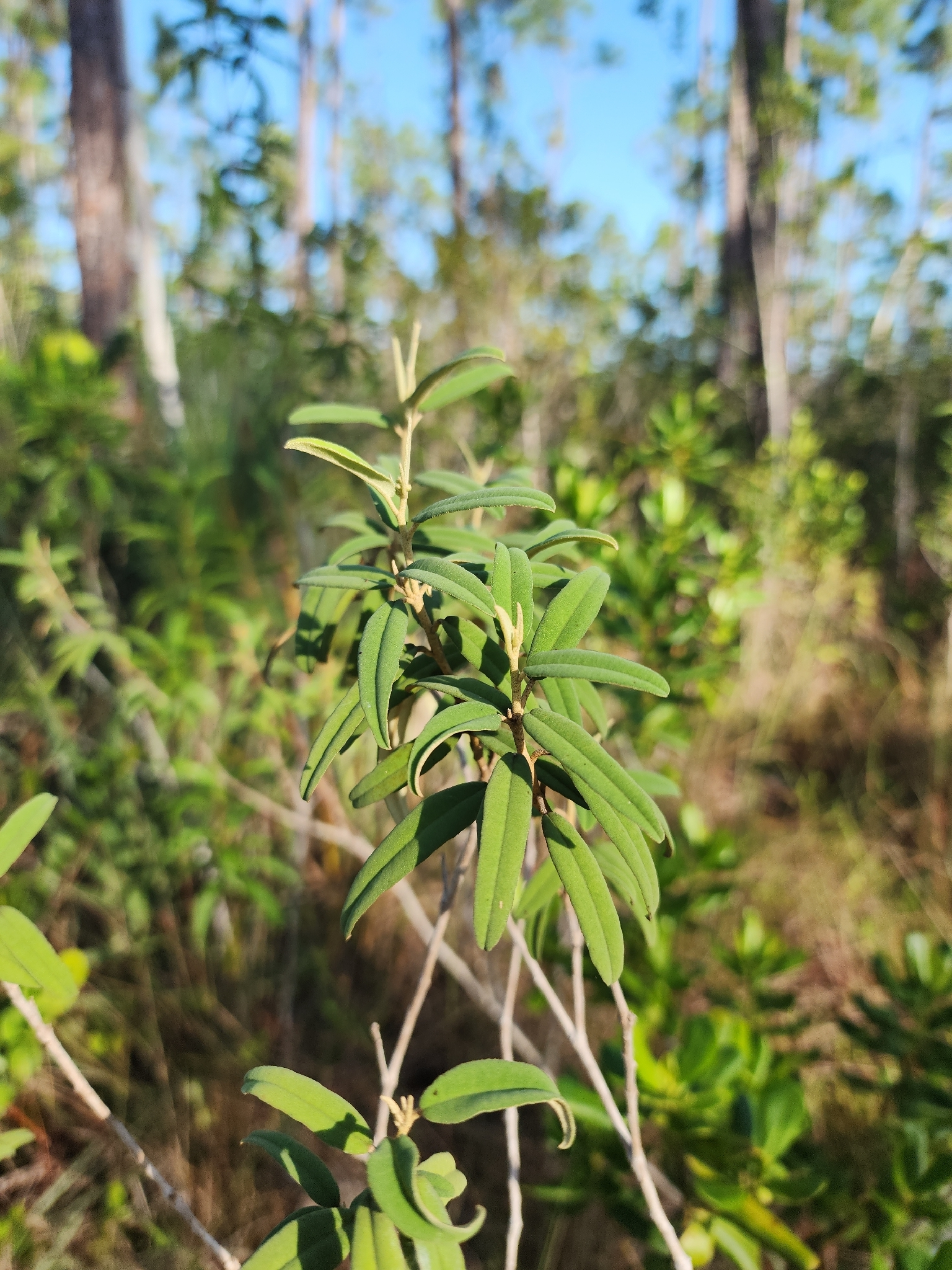
- Growing in pine rockland habitat at Long Pine Key in the Everglades

Conservation status
- Secure (NatureServe)

Scientific classification
- Kingdom: Plantae
- Clade: Tracheophytes
- Clade: Angiosperms
- Clade: Eudicots
- Clade: Rosids
- Order: Malpighiales
- Family: Euphorbiaceae
- Genus: Croton
- Species: C. linearis

Binomial name
- Croton linearis Jacq.

= Croton linearis =

Species of flowering plant

Croton linearis, commonly called pineland croton, is a flowering plant native to the Caribbean (including the Bahamas, Cuba, Jamaica, and Hispaniola) and south Florida.

== Habitat ==
Throughout its range it can be found in pine rocklands, marl prairies, coastal strands, and disturbed uplands.

== Conservation ==
It can be found in a relatively large geographic area throughout the Caribbean, so it does not appear to be globally imperiled. However, NatureServe regards it as threatened in south Florida, as much of its habitat has been lost to development.
