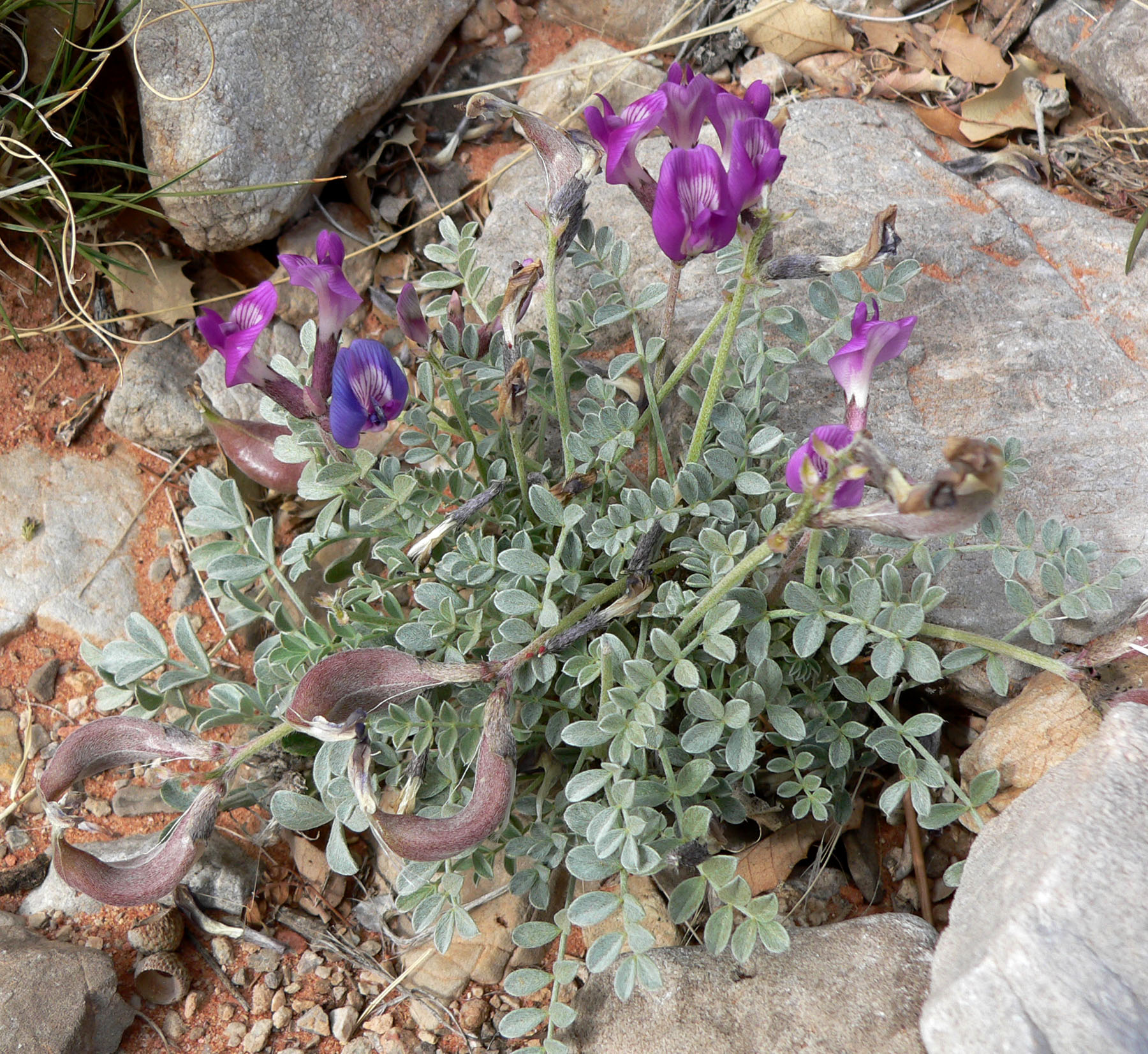

Conservation status
- Secure (NatureServe)

Scientific classification
- Kingdom: Plantae
- Clade: Tracheophytes
- Clade: Angiosperms
- Clade: Eudicots
- Clade: Rosids
- Order: Fabales
- Family: Fabaceae
- Subfamily: Faboideae
- Genus: Astragalus
- Species: A. amphioxys

Binomial name
- Astragalus amphioxys Gray

Varieties
- Astragalus amphioxys var. amphioxys; Astragalus amphioxys var. musimonum (Barneby) Barneby; Astragalus amphioxys var. vespertinus (E.Sheld.) M.E.Jones

Synonyms
- List: Astragalus crescenticarpus E.Sheld. (1894); Astragalus marcusjonesii Munz (1941); Astragalus musimonum Barneby (1944); Astragalus selenaeus Greene (1895); Astragalus shortianus var. minor A.Gray (1864); Astragalus vespertinus E.Sheld. (1894); Xylophacos amphioxys (A.Gray) Rydb.; Xylophacos aragalloides Rydb. (1907); Xylophacos melanocalyx Rydb. (1925); Xylophacos vespertinus (E.Sheld.) Rydb. (1905)

= Astragalus amphioxys =

Crescent milkvetch

Species of milkvetch

Astragalus amphioxys, common name crescent milkvetch, is a plant found in the American southwest, including the whole of Utah, the southeast part of Nevada, the north part of Arizona, the western part of Colorado, the northwestern part of New Mexico, and one county in Texas. It was first described by Asa Gray in 1878.

== Description ==
The color of the flowers ranges from pink-purple to reddish-purple. The irregular flowers are in elongated clusters. The bloom period is between the months of March to June. It rarely flowers in its first year of life. The petals are around twice as long as the sepals. The leaf color is green to silvery-white. The compound leaves are round or oval in shape. The smooth leaves have an alternate leaf attachment. The spineless leaves and stem have hair on them. They have the same amount of hair on opposite sides. The fruits are pods. The pods only have one chamber and an lower seam that lies in a groove, distinguishing it from other similar species. It is most commonly found in the months of April, May, and June.

Astragalus amphioxys has 4 subspecies:

Astragalus amphioxys var. amphioxys native to Nevada, Utah, Arizona, and New Mexico, secure in all four.

Astragalus amphioxys var. modestus native to Nevada, Utah, and Arizona, critically endangered.

Astragalus amphioxys var. musimonum native to Nevada and Arizona, imperiled in Nevada and critically endangered in Arizona.

Astragalus amphioxys var. vespertinus native to Nevada, Utah, Arizona, Colorado, and New Mexico.

== Distribution and habitat ==
It can be found in deserts, arid grasslands, and among piñon and juniper. It occurs in the Desert Scrub, Interior Chaparral, Semidesert Grasslands, Pinyon Juniper Woodland, and Montane Conifer Forest plant communities, at elevations of 2000–7000 feet.

Although most of the observations of the species were in the general range that the species is known for (I.e. Southwestern U.S.), according to GBIF.org, there was one observation of it in Northeastern Alaska.

It can be found in Arches National Park, specifically around the visitor center and on the Portal trail outside the park.

It has a global rank of G5, which means it is very secure. Arizona and Nevada rank it as secure, but Texas ranks it as very endangered in the state. All of the other states don't have a rank for their state.

== Uses ==
The Zuni use the plant medicinally. The fresh or dried root is chewed by a medicine man before sucking snakebite and poultice applied to wound.
