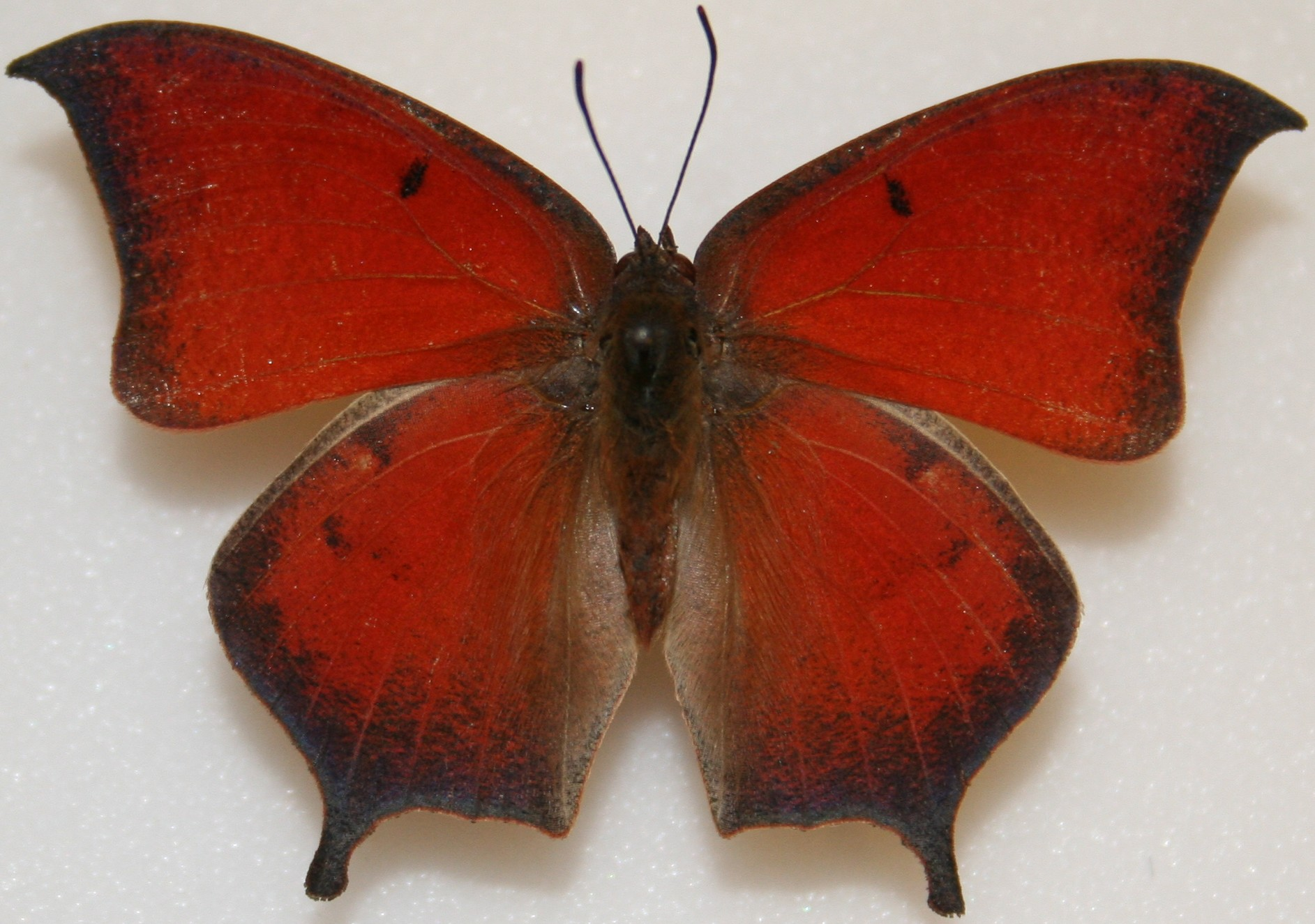

Scientific classification
- Domain: Eukaryota
- Kingdom: Animalia
- Phylum: Arthropoda
- Class: Insecta
- Order: Lepidoptera
- Family: Nymphalidae
- Genus: Anaea
- Species: A. aidea

Binomial name
- Anaea aidea (Guérin-Méneville, 1844)

Synonyms
- Anaea troglodyta aidea; Nymphalis aidea Guérin-Méneville, [1844]; Paphia morrisonii Edwards, 1883; Paphia morrisonii W. H. Edwards, 1884; Anaea troglodya appiciata Röber, 1918

= Anaea aidea =

Species of butterfly

Anaea aidea, the tropical leafwing, is a species of brush-footed butterfly (family Nymphalidae) in the subfamily Charaxinae. Its native range extends from Mexico to northwestern Costa Rica, with strays sometimes seen in southern Texas, Arizona, and California in the United States. Some authors consider Anaea aidea to be a subspecies of Anaea troglodyta.

It has a wingspan of 57–78 mm (2.2–3.1 in). The larvae feed on Croton species.

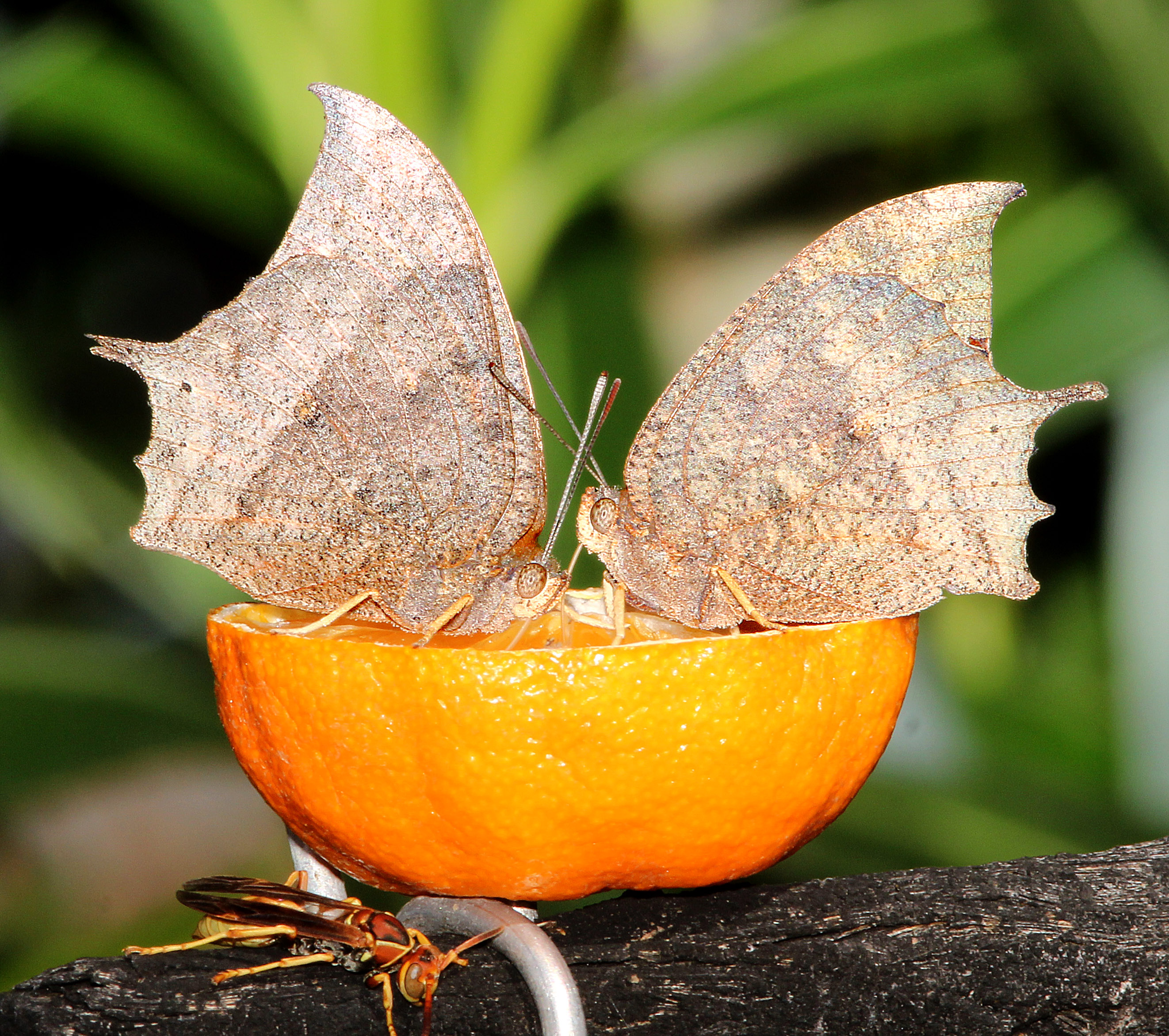
Adults feeding

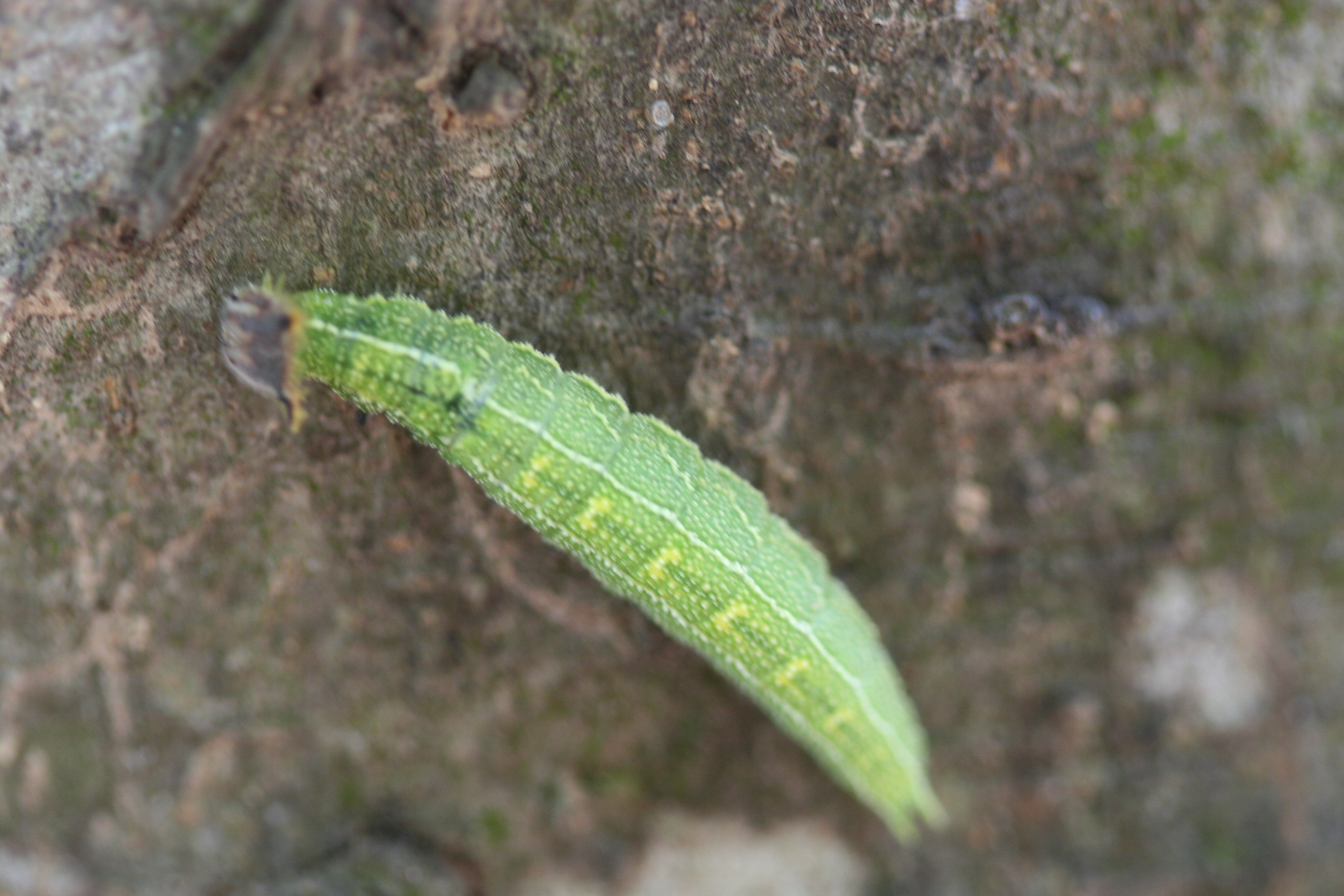
Caterpillar
