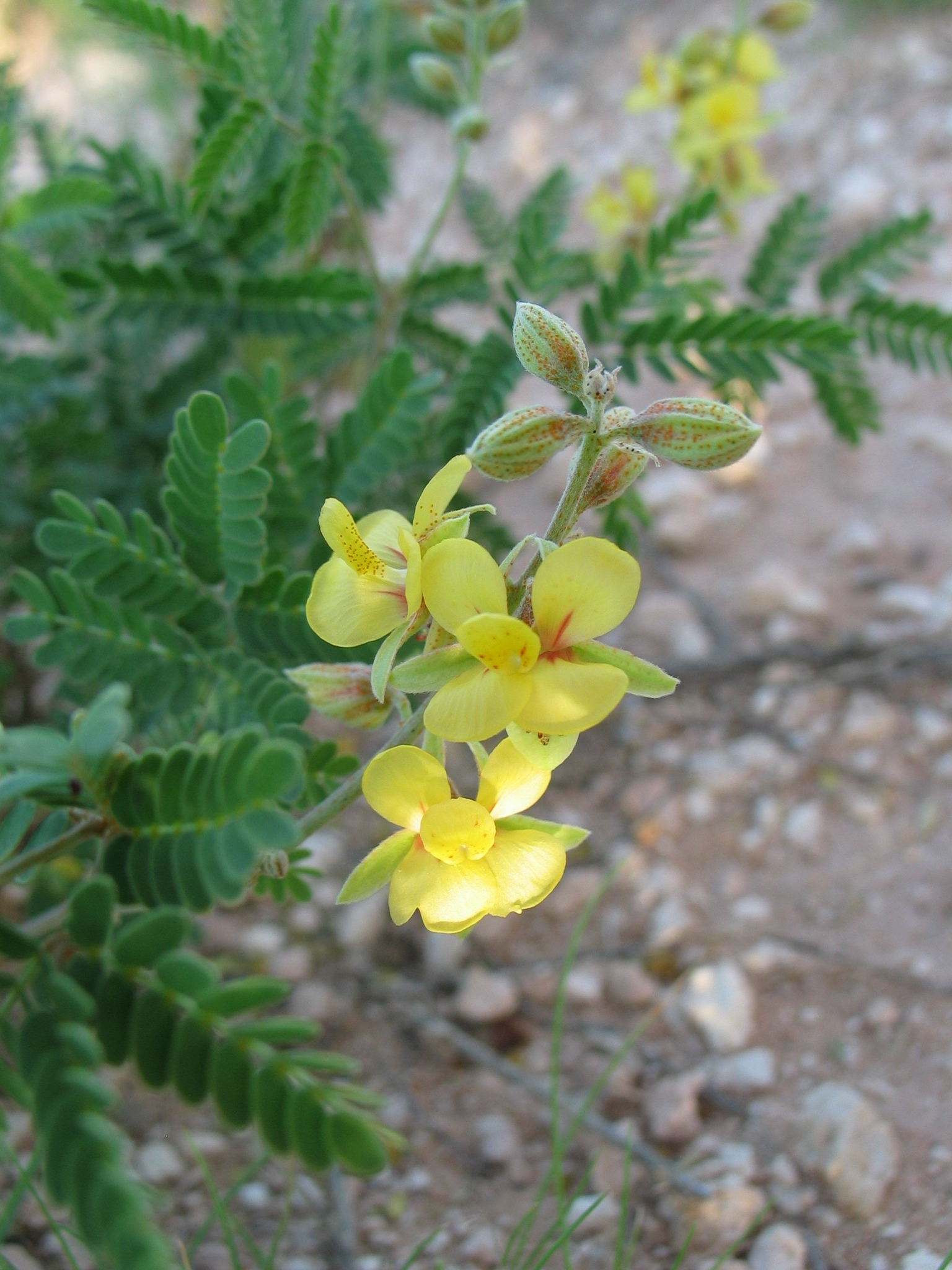

Conservation status
- Least Concern (IUCN 3.1)

- Secure (NatureServe)

Scientific classification
- Kingdom: Plantae
- Clade: Tracheophytes
- Clade: Angiosperms
- Clade: Eudicots
- Clade: Rosids
- Order: Fabales
- Family: Fabaceae
- Subfamily: Caesalpinioideae
- Genus: Pomaria
- Species: P. jamesii

Binomial name
- Pomaria jamesii (Torr. & A.Gray) Walp.

Synonyms
- List: Caesalpinia jamesii (Torr. & A.Gray) Fisher (1893); Hoffmannseggia jamesii Torr. & A.Gray (1840); Larrea jamesii (Torr. & A.Gray) Britton (1930); Hoffmannseggia jamesii var. popinoensis Fisher (1892)

= Pomaria jamesii =

Plant species in the pea family

Pomaria jamesii, commonly known as James' holdback, is a species of plant found in the American southwest.

== Uses ==
The Zuni people give an infusion of this plant to sheep to make them "prolific".
