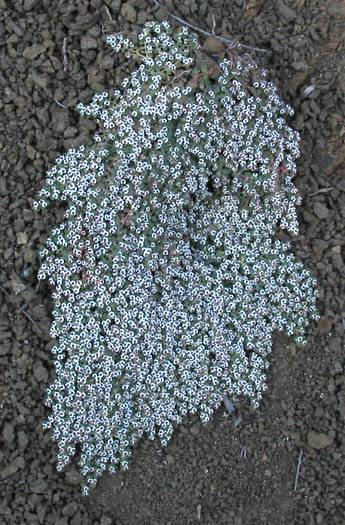

Scientific classification
- Kingdom: Plantae
- Clade: Tracheophytes
- Clade: Angiosperms
- Clade: Eudicots
- Clade: Rosids
- Order: Malpighiales
- Family: Euphorbiaceae
- Genus: Euphorbia
- Species: E. polycarpa

Binomial name
- Euphorbia polycarpa Benth.

Synonyms
- Chamaesyce polycarpa

= Euphorbia polycarpa =

Species of flowering plant

Euphorbia polycarpa (formerly Chamaesyce polycarpa) is a species of spurge known by the common name smallseed sandmat. It is native to the southwestern United States and northern Mexico, especially the deserts and other dry, sandy areas. This is a perennial herb producing stems that trail along the ground to form a clump or mat, sometimes growing somewhat upright. The leaves are each under a centimeter long. They are round or oval-shaped and have triangular stipules at the bases. What looks like a single flower is actually an inflorescence of many staminate (male) flowers united around a single central pistillate (female) flower. Bracts surrounding the flower unit are white and petal-like. The fruit is a thin spherical capsule less than 2 millimeters wide layered over a seed.

"Chamae" derives from the Greek meaning "on the ground", referring to its spreading low lying growth near the ground, and "Syke" is from Greek for "fig".

== Uses ==
Among the Zuni people, a warm gruel made with the plant and white cornmeal and taken to promote milk flow.
