= Ottleya wrightii =

Scientific classification
- Kingdom: Plantae
- Clade: Embryophytes
- Clade: Tracheophytes
- Clade: Spermatophytes
- Clade: Angiosperms
- Clade: Eudicots
- Clade: Rosids
- Order: Fabales
- Family: Fabaceae
- Subfamily: Faboideae
- Genus: Ottleya
- Species: O. wrightii

Binomial name
- Ottleya wrightii (A.Gray) D.D.Sokoloff

Synonyms
- Acmispon wrightii (A.Gray) Brouillet; Anisolotus wrightii (A.Gray) Rydb.; Hosackia wrightii A.Gray; Lotus wrightii (A.Gray) Greene

Species of legume

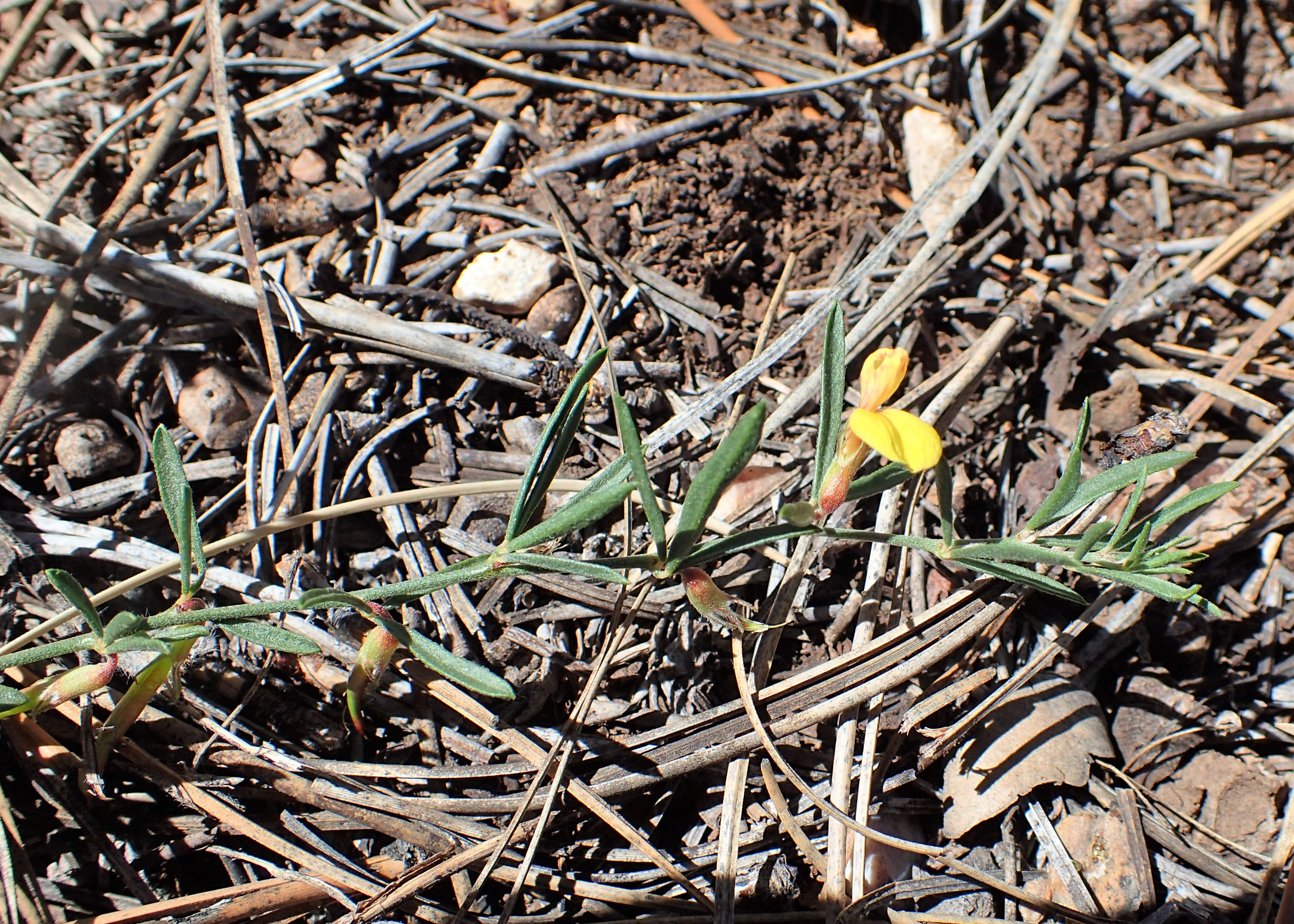
Acmispon wrightii, also known as Lotus wrightii, in Kaibab National Forest, Arizona, US.

Ottleya wrightii, synonym Lotus wrightii, is a species of legume native to the southwestern United States (Arizona, Colorado, New Mexico and Utah). It is also said to occur in Nevada. It is known as Wright's deervetch.

It has yellow flowers on many stems, arising from a single root crown. It was named after Charles Wright.

The Zuni people apply a poultice of the chewed root to swellings that they believe are caused by being witched by a bullsnake.
