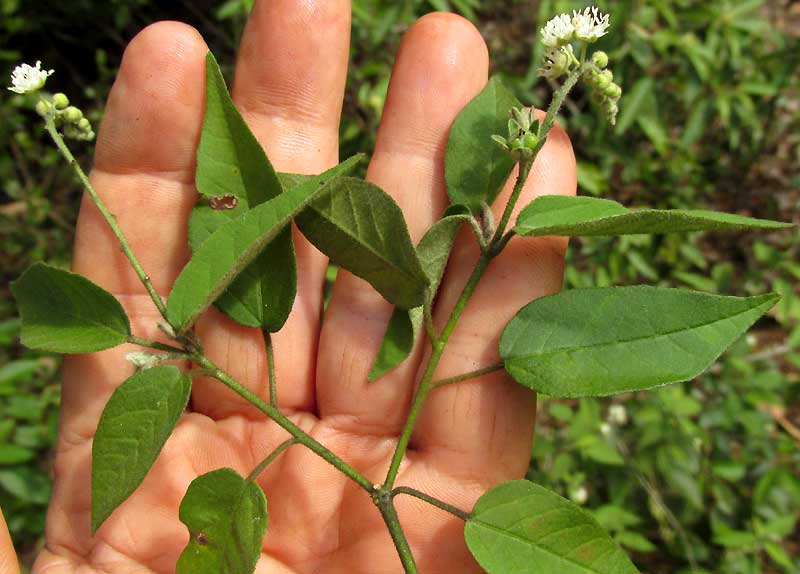
- Croton humilis leafy stem with flowers

Scientific classification
- Kingdom: Plantae
- Clade: Tracheophytes
- Clade: Angiosperms
- Clade: Eudicots
- Clade: Rosids
- Order: Malpighiales
- Family: Euphorbiaceae
- Genus: Croton
- Species: C. humilis

Binomial name
- Croton humilis L.

Synonyms
- List: Oxydectes humilis (L.) Kuntze; Croton albidus Müll.Arg.; Croton aridicola Urb.; Croton berlandieri Torr.; Croton salvifolius Mill.; Croton subcapitatus Müll.Arg.; Croton subtomentosus L.; Oxydectes albida (Müll.Arg.) Kuntze; Oxydectes berlandieri (Torr.) Kuntze; Oxydectes salvifolia (Mill.) Kuntze

= Croton humilis =

Species of plant

Croton humilis, the pepperbush or low croton, is a species of shrub or subshrub native to the southernmost USA, to Mexico and the Caribbean. It belongs to the family Euphorbiaceae.

== Description ==
Pepperbush belongs to a large genus in a large family, and is similar to numerous other species. Here are key features helping to distinguish pepperbush:

- Its much-branched stems covered with sticky, branched or "setellate" hairs grow up to 2 m (6 ft 7 in) tall, though smaller in the USA.
- Leaves with petioles up to 5 cm (2 in) long have somewhat oval blades up to 8 cm (3 1/4 in) long and 5 cm (2 in) wide, with rounded to slightly 2-lobed bases and sharp tips. Blade margins bear no teeth or indentations but may have tiny glands. Blade upper surfaces are hairy to nearly hairless while lower surfaces are densely covered with branched "stellate" hairs.
- Plants are monoecious, bearing flowers which either are entirely male or entirely female. The plants' individual inflorescences may produce flowers either of both sexes, or just one sex. An inflorescence may bear from 20-35 male flowers, and up to 6 female ones.
- Male flowers on pedicels up to 4 mm (3/16 in) long have 5 sepals and 5 petals, both up to 4 mm (3/16 in) long, and up to 35 stamens (only up to 20 in Florida). Female flowers also have 5 sepals about 4 mm (3/16 in) long, but may lack petals or have 5 only up to 1 mm (1/16 in) long. The single ovary has 3 compartments, or locules, topped by 3 styles up to 5 mm (3/16 in); these styles branch to produce 12 terminal segments. Sometimes sepal margins of female flowers bear short-stalked glands or glands without stalks.
- Fruits are 3-lobed capsules.

== Distribution ==
Pepperbush in the USA occurs only in the states of Texas and Florida. In Mexico it inhabits the eastern states from Tamaulipas in the north to Chiapas in the south, including the Yucatan Peninsula. In Central America it occurs in Nicaragua, and in the Caribbean it is scattered in the Bahamas, Jamaica, Dominican Republic, Haiti, Puerto Rico and the Virgin Islands. Also in Cuba.

== Habitat ==
In the USA, pepperbush occurs in hammocks, thickets and disturbed areas up to 50 m (160 ft) in elevation. In the Bahamas, it grows on limestone along the edges of dry broadleaf evergreen formations mostly in shrublands. In Mexico's Yucatan Peninsula, it is found in low-growing dry forests with deciduous leaves, and disturbed, weedy areas such as along roads and in agricultural fields.

== Ecology ==
In southern Texas, USA, pepperbush is reported as a host plant for the Tropical Leafwing butterfly, Anaea aidea. In fact, in Texas it is said of the species that "Small butterflies, skippers and hairstreaks, love them." At least seven species of small butterflies, mostly hairstreaks, have been documented visiting pepperbush flowers.

=== Use in pollinator gardens ===
In Texas, pepperbush has been chosen for a pollinator garden and as part of the monarch waystation program.

== As a toxic plant ==
Sap of the leaves and flowers of pepperbush can burn the eyes' corneas causing blindness.

=== As a plant-based acaricide ===
Laboratory tests show that an ethanol-type extract using pepperbush leaves makes an effective acaricide: It kills 100% of the mite species Varroa destructor, which attacks and feeds on honey bees, thus greatly affecting beekeeping and honey production in Mexico's Yucatan Peninsula.

== In traditional medicine ==
Despite the toxicity of pepperbush sap, the plant's roots are documented as used to treat skin problems and urinary disorder.

== Taxonomy ==
When in 1759 when Carl Linnaeus named Croton humilis, he spelled the species name as humile, apparently using the neuter spelling matching the perceived neuter gender of the generic name Croton. Later, under the modern International Code of Nomenclature for algae, fungi, and plants, the practice became to treat the genus Croton as masculine, requiring that Linnaeus's spelling be changed to humilis.

=== Etymology ===
The genus name Croton derives from the Greek kroton, meaning "tick," alluding to the seeds' appearance.

The species name humilis is rooted in the Latin humus, meaning "earth, soil, ground," with the extended association of being "humble, obscure, poor, needy, insignificant" etc., which some people may think appropriate for a modest little weed like Croton humilis.

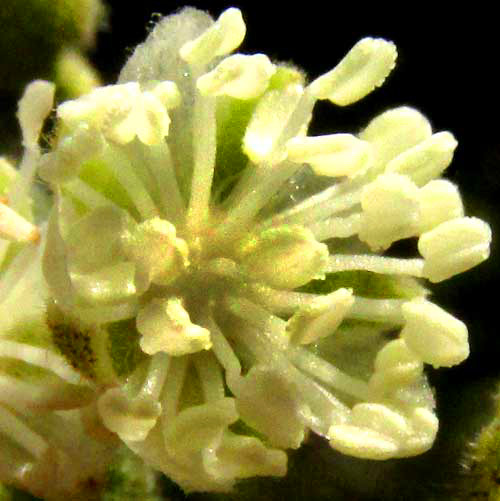
Male flower

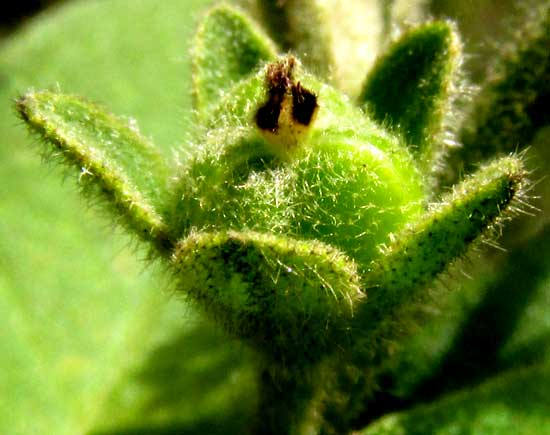
Female flower with developing ovary

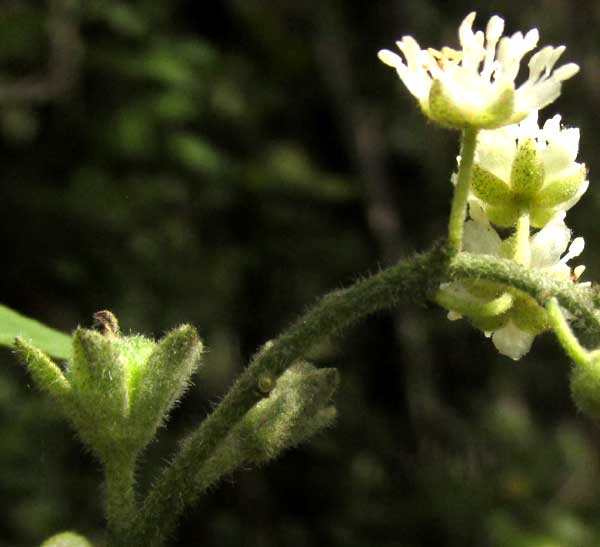
Male and female flower on same stem

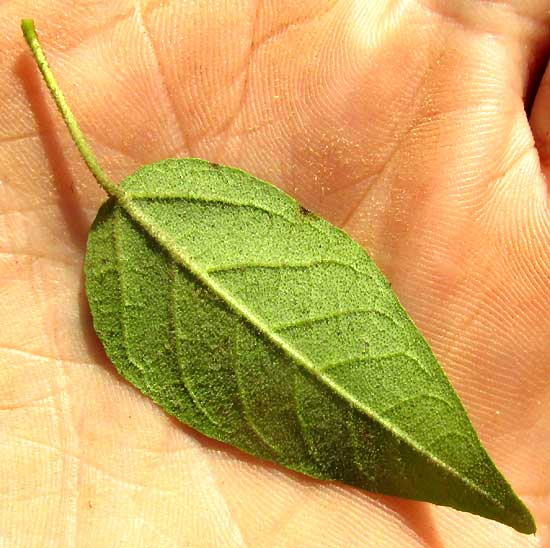
Leaf underside

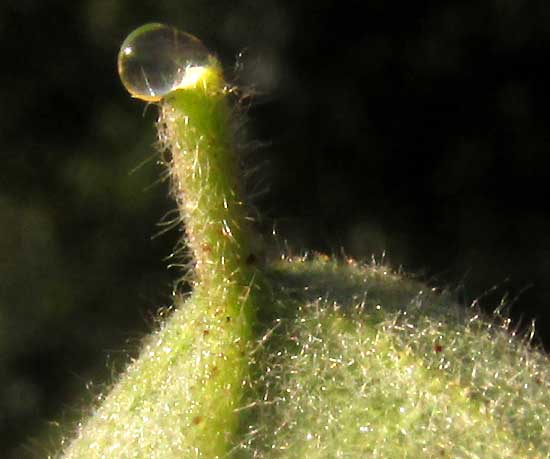
Clear sap exuding from cut petiole
