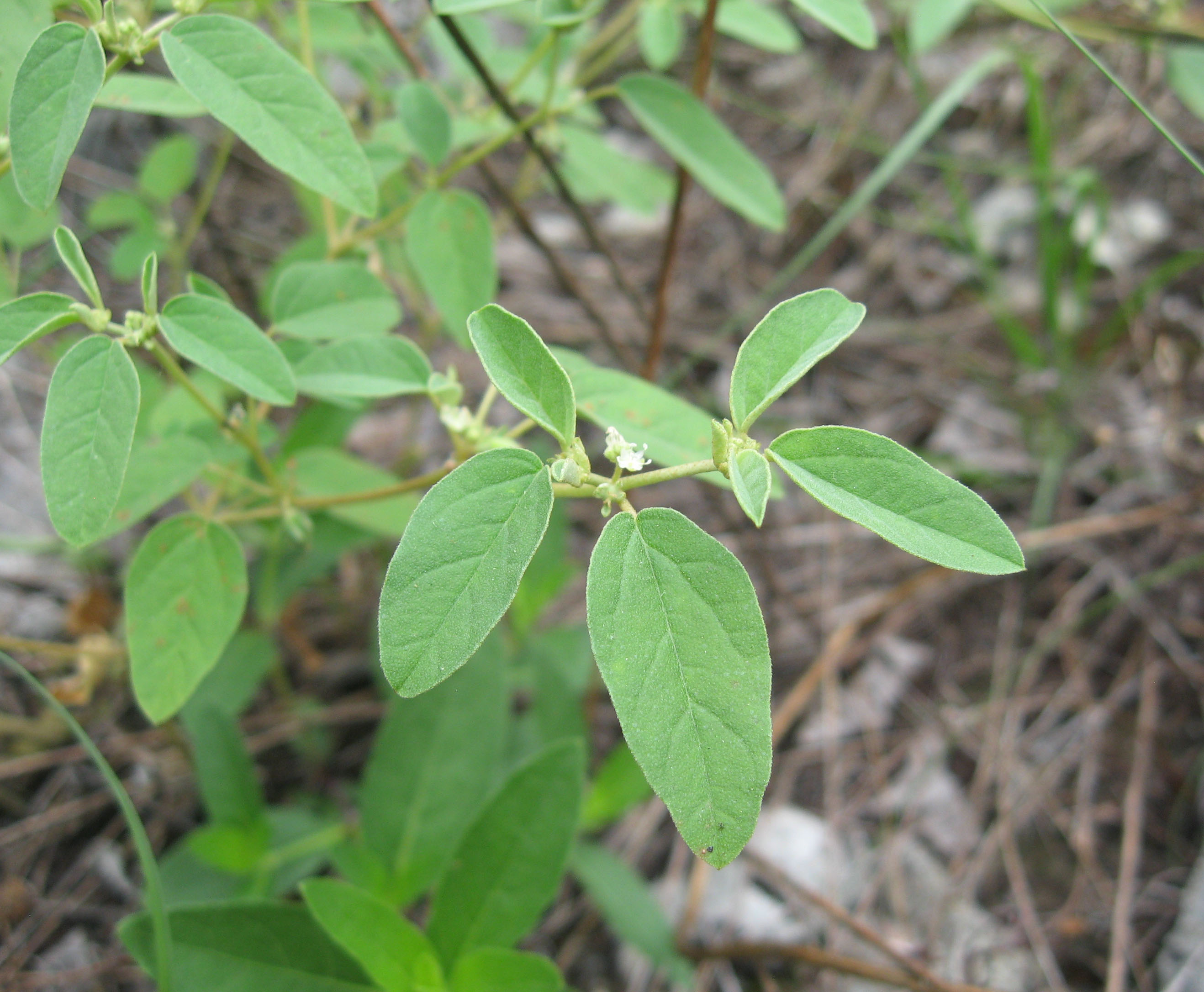

Scientific classification
- Kingdom: Plantae
- Clade: Embryophytes
- Clade: Tracheophytes
- Clade: Angiosperms
- Clade: Eudicots
- Clade: Rosids
- Order: Malpighiales
- Family: Euphorbiaceae
- Genus: Croton
- Species: C. monanthogynus

Binomial name
- Croton monanthogynus Michx.

= Croton monanthogynus =

Species of flowering plant

Croton monanthogynus is a species of flowering plant in the spurge family. The undersides are gray. It is a summer annual that produces small, inconspicuous flowers. The plant is monoecious and has both male and female reproductive organs in separate clusters on the same plant. Its leaves are alternate. It is native to the southeastern United States and the southern Great Plains. It is considered adventive in more northern states. AL, AR, AZ, GA, IA, IL, IN, KS, KY, LA, MD, MI, MO, MS, NC, NE, OH, OK, PA, SC, TN, TX, VA, WI, WV.

The plant in is found in sunny, dry habitats, of both disturbed and high-quality areas. Its common names include prairie tea, one-seed croton, dove weed, and prairie goatweed. Other plant characteristics include alternate leaf arrangement, (or phyllotaxis) and a tap root. It is an annual and it has entire leaf margins. The type of fruit is a capsule, sepals exist on the flowers. The flowers are small and white. It possess glands that emit a pleasant odor. The plant may grow 6 inches to 3 feet and blooms April through September. The seeds are black.

The plant prefers full sun, dry conditions, and poor soil.

The plant can have a bushy appearance with a flattened top. Dwarf plants may instead, grow to than 6" tall. Croton monanthogynus provides food for wildlife. These species will feed on seeds: sparrows, mourning dove, wild turkey, prairie chicken, bobwhite, and cowbird.

While some people may be allergic to this member of the spurge family, the leaves of these sweet-smelling herbs produce a mildly flavored golden tea. Dried leaves produce a stronger flavor than fresh. It is said that Prairie tea can also be used like basil as a spice.
