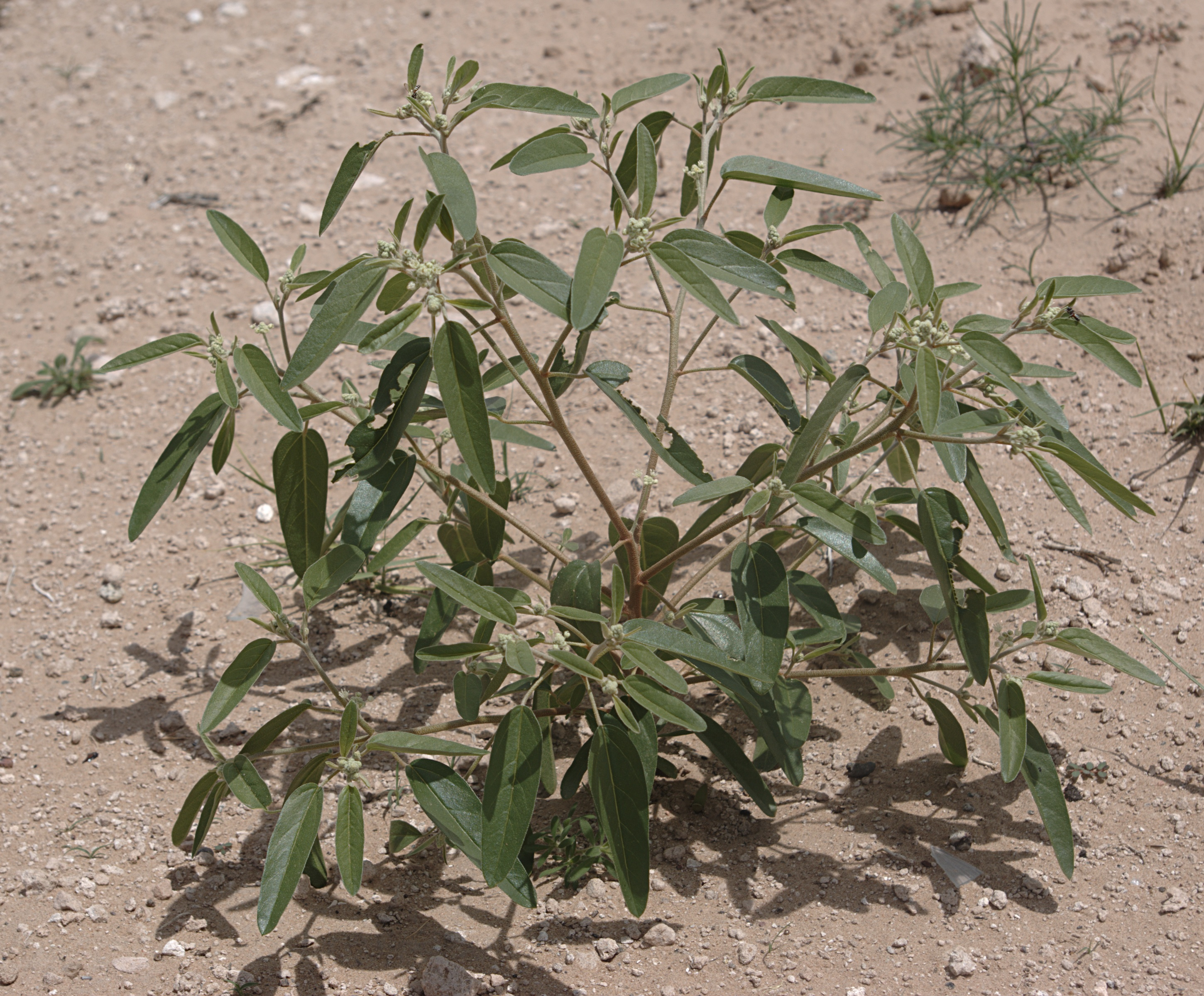
- Male plant

Conservation status
- Secure (NatureServe)

Scientific classification
- Kingdom: Plantae
- Clade: Tracheophytes
- Clade: Angiosperms
- Clade: Eudicots
- Clade: Rosids
- Order: Malpighiales
- Family: Euphorbiaceae
- Genus: Croton
- Species: C. texensis

Binomial name
- Croton texensis (Klotzsch) Müll.Arg.

= Croton texensis =

Species of flowering plant

Croton texensis, commonly known as Texas croton, goat weed, skunk weed, and doveweed, is a species of plant found in the United States.

== Uses ==
Among the Zuni people, a decoction of the plant is taken for "sick stomach", as a purgative, and as a diuretic. An infusion is also taken for stomachaches, for syphilis, and for gonorrhea. The fresh or dried root is chewed by a medicine man before sucking snakebite and a poultice is applied to the wound. The whole plant can be placed under the mattress or burned to repel bedbugs.
