= List of Croton species =

This is the alphabetical list of 1149 species accepted as belonging to the genus Croton, as of March 2021.

== A ==
- Croton abaitensis Baill.
- Croton abeggii Urb. & Ekman
- Croton aberrans Müll.Arg.
- Croton abonari Riina & P.E.Berry
- Croton abutilifolius Croizat
- Croton abutiloides Kunth
- Croton abutilopsis G.L.Webster
- Croton acapulcensis M.J.Martinez Gordillo & J.Jiménez Ram.
- Croton aceroides Radcl.-Sm.
- Croton ackermannianus (Müll.Arg.) G.L.Webster
- Croton acradenius Pax & K.Hoffm.
- Croton acronychioides F.Muell.
- Croton acuminatissimus (Pittier) G.L.Webster
- Croton acunae Borhidi
- Croton acutifolius Esser
- Croton adabolavensis Leandri
- Croton adamantinus Müll.Arg.
- Croton adenocalyx Baill.
- Croton adenodontus (Müll.Arg.) Müll.Arg.
- Croton adenophorus Baill.
- Croton adenophyllum Spreng.
- Croton adipatus Kunth
- Croton adspersus Benth.
- Croton aemulus Barbosa & Carn.-Torres
- Croton aequatoris Croizat
- Croton agoensis Baill.
- Croton agrestis (Pax & K.Hoffm.) Radcl.-Sm. & Govaerts
- Croton agrophilus Müll.Arg.
- Croton alabamensis E.A.Sm. ex Chapm.
  - Croton alabamensis var. texensis
- Croton alagoensis Müll.Arg.
- Croton alainii B.W.van Ee & P.E.Berry
- Croton alamosanus Rose
- Croton albellus Müll.Arg.
- Croton alchorneicarpus Croizat
- Croton alchorneifolius Radcl.-Sm.
- Croton aleuritoides P.E.Berry
- Croton alienus Pax
- Croton allemii G.L.Webster
- Croton alloeophyllus Urb.
- Croton alnifolius Lam.
- Croton alpinus A.Chev. ex Gagnep.
- Croton alvaradonis M.E.Jones
- Croton amazonicus Müll.Arg.
- Croton ambanivoulensis Baill.
- Croton ambovombensis Radcl.-Sm. & Govaerts
- Croton ameliae Lundell
- Croton amentiformis Riina
- Croton amphileucus Briq.
- Croton amplifolius Airy Shaw
- Croton andinus Müll.Arg.
- Croton androiensis (Leandri) Leandri
- Croton angolensis Müll.Arg.
- Croton angustifrons Müll.Arg.
- Croton anisatus Baill.
- Croton anisodontus Müll.Arg.
- Croton ankarensis Leandri
- Croton ankeranae Kainul.
- Croton anomalus Pittier
- Croton anosiravensis Leandri
- Croton antae Airy Shaw
- Croton antanosiensis Leandri
- Croton antisyphiliticus Mart.
- Croton apicifolius Croizat
- Croton apostolon Radcl.-Sm. & Govaerts
- Croton appertii J.Léonard
- Croton araracuarae J.Murillo, P.E.Berry & M.V.Arbeláez
- Croton araripensis Croizat
- Croton arboreus Millsp.
- Croton arechavaletae Herter ex Arechav.
- Croton arenosus Carn.-Torres & Cordeiro
- Croton argentealbidus Radcl.-Sm. & Govaerts
- Croton argenteus L.
- Croton argentinus Müll.Arg.
- Croton argyranthemus Michx.
- Croton argyratus Blume
- Croton argyrodaphne Baill.
- Croton argyroglossus Baill.
- Croton argyrophyllus Kunth
- Croton aridus P.I.Forst.
- Croton aripoensis Philcox
- Croton arirambae Huber
- Croton aristophlebius Croizat
- Croton arlineae D.Medeiros, L.Senna & R.J.V.Alves
- Croton armstrongii S.Moore
- Croton arnhemicus Müll.Arg.
- Croton aromaticus L.
- Croton artibonitensis Urb.
- Croton ascendens Secco & N.A.Rosa
- Croton asperrimus Benth.
- Croton astianus Croizat
- Croton astroites Aiton
- Croton astrophorus Urb.
- Croton ater Croizat
- Croton atrorufus Müll.Arg.
- Croton atrostellatus V.W.Steinm.
- Croton aubrevilecta Leandri
- Croton aubrevillei J.Léonard
- Croton avulsus Croizat
- Croton axillaris Müll.Arg.
- Croton azuensis Urb.

== B ==
- Croton babuyanensis Croizat
- Croton balsameus Müll.Arg.
- Croton balsensis V.W.Steinm. & Mart.Gord.
- Croton bangii Rusby
- Croton barahonensis Urb.
- Croton barbatus Kunth
- Croton barorum Leandri
- Croton basaltorum (Leandri) P.E.Berry
- Croton bastardii Leandri
- Croton batangasensis Croizat
- Croton bathianus Leandri
- Croton beckii Riina & Feio
- Croton beetlei Croizat
- Croton bemaranus Leandri
- Croton bemarivensis Leandri
- Croton berberifolius Croizat
- Croton bergassae Leandri
- Croton bernieri Baill.
- Croton betaceus Baill.
- Croton betiokensis Leandri
- Croton betulaster Müll.Arg.
- Croton betulinus Vahl
- Croton biaroensis Croizat
- Croton bidentatus Müll.Arg.
- Croton bifurcatus Baill.
- Croton bigbendensis B.L.Turner
- Croton billbergianus Müll.Arg.
- Croton bispinosus C.Wright
- Croton bisserratus Sessé & Moc.
- Croton blanchetianus Baill.
- Croton boavitanus Croizat
- Croton bocquillonii Baill.
- Croton boinensis Leandri
- Croton boissieri Müll.Arg.
- Croton boiteaui Leandri
- Croton boivinianus (Baill.) Baill.
- Croton bojerianus Baill.
- Croton bolivarensis Croizat
- Croton bonplandianus Baill.
- Croton borbensis Secco & P.E.Berry
- Croton borhidii O.Muñiz
- Croton borneensis J.J.Sm.
- Croton brachypus Airy Shaw
- Croton brachytrichus Urb.
- Croton bracteatus Lam.
- Croton brassii Croizat
- Croton bredemeyeri Müll.Arg.
- Croton breedlovei B.W.van Ee & P.E.Berry
- Croton bresolinii L.B.Sm. & Downs
- Croton brevipes Pax
- Croton brevispicatus Baill.
- Croton brieyi De Wild.
- Croton brittonianus Carabia
- Croton brittonii Acev.-Rodr.
- Croton bryophorus Croizat
- Croton buchii Urb.
- Croton burchellii Müll.Arg.
- Croton buxifolius (Baill.) Müll.Arg.
- Croton byrnesii Airy Shaw

== C ==
- Croton caboensis Croizat
- Croton cajucara Benth.
- Croton caldensis Müll.Arg.
- Croton calderi Chakrab. & N.P.Balakr.
- Croton californicus Müll.Arg.
- Croton callicarpifolius Vahl
- Croton calocephalus Müll.Arg.
- Croton calonervosus G.L.Webster
- Croton calyciglandulosus Allem
- Croton calycinus Spreng.
- Croton calycireduplicatus Allem
- Croton campanulatus Caruzo & Cordeiro
- Croton campenonii Baill.
- Croton campestris A.St.-Hil., A.Juss. & Cambess.
- Croton campinarensis Secco, A.Rosário & P.E.Berry
- Croton camposii Riina & Ore-Rengifo
- Croton capitatus Michx.
- Croton capitis-york Airy Shaw
- Croton caracasanus Pittier
- Croton carandaitensis Croizat
- Croton cardenasii Standl.
- Croton carinatus Müll.Arg.
- Croton carpostellatus B.L.León & Mart.Gord.
- Croton carrii Airy Shaw
- Croton cascarilloides Raeusch.
- Croton cassinoides Lam.
- Croton catamarcensis Ahumada
- Croton catariae Baill.
- Croton catatii Baill.
- Croton catharinensis L.B.Sm. & Downs
- Croton catinganus Müll.Arg.
- Croton caudatus Geiseler
- Croton ceanothifolius Baill.
- Croton cearensis Baill.
- Croton celtidifolius Baill.
- Croton cerinodentatus Müll.Arg.
- Croton cerinus Müll.Arg.
- Croton cerroazulensis P.E.Berry & Galdames
- Croton chaetophorus Müll.Arg.
- Croton chamanus Steyerm.
- Croton chamelensis E.J.Lott
- Croton chapelieri Baill.
- Croton charaguensis Standl.
- Croton chauvetiae Leandri
- Croton chiapensis Lundell
- Croton chilensis Müll.Arg.
- Croton chimboracensis P.E.Berry & Riina
- Croton chiribiquetensis Cordiel
- Croton chittagongensis Chakrab. & N.P.Balakr.
- Croton chlaenacicomes Leandri
- Croton chlorocalyx Müll.Arg.
- Croton chloroleucus Müll.Arg.
- Croton chocoanus Croizat
- Croton chodatii (Croizat) P.E.Berry
- Croton choristadenius K.Schum.
- Croton chrysocladus Müll.Arg.
- Croton chrysodaphne Baill.
- Croton chunianus Croizat
- Croton churumayensis Croizat
- Croton churutensis Riina & Cornejo
- Croton chypreae Leandri
- Croton ciliatoglandulifer Ortega
- Croton cinerascens Radcl.-Sm. & Govaerts
- Croton cinerellus Müll.Arg.
- Croton claessensii Vermoesen ex De Wild.
- Croton claussenianus Baill.
- Croton clavuliger Müll.Arg.
- Croton cliffordii Hutch. & E.A.Bruce
- Croton cnidophyllus Radcl.-Sm. & Govaerts
- Croton coccymelophyllus Radcl.-Sm. & Govaerts
- Croton colliguay Molina
- Croton colubrinoides Merr.
- Croton columnaris Airy Shaw
- Croton comatus Vell.
- Croton comayaguanus Standl. & L.O.Williams
- Croton comes Standl. & L.O.Williams
- Croton compressus Lam.
- Croton condorensis Riina & Cerón
- Croton conduplicatus Kunth
- Croton confertus Baker
- Croton confinis L.B.Sm. & Downs
- Croton congensis De Wild.
- Croton consanguineus Müll.Arg.
- Croton conspurcatus Schltdl.
- Croton constrictus Baill.
- Croton cooperianus (Croizat) Radcl.-Sm. & Govaerts
- Croton corallicola Borhidi
- Croton corchoropsis Baill.
- Croton cordatulus Airy Shaw
- Croton cordiifolius Baill.
- Croton coriaceus Kunth
- Croton coriifolius Airy Shaw
- Croton corinthius Poveda & J.A.González
- Croton coronatus Urb.
- Croton cortesianus Kunth
- Croton corumbensis S.Moore
- Croton coryi Croizat - Cory's croton
- Croton corylifolius Lam.
- Croton costatus Kunth
- Croton cotabatensis Croizat
- Croton cotoneaster Müll.Arg.
- Croton craspedotrichus Griseb.
- Croton crassifolius Geiseler
- Croton crispatus Thulin
- Croton cristalensis Urb.
- Croton crocodilorum Leandri
- Croton crossolepis P.E.Berry & Kainul.
- Croton crustulifer Croizat
- Croton cubiensis Gagnep.
- Croton cuchillae-nigrae Croizat
- Croton cucutensis Croizat
- Croton culiacanensis Croizat
- Croton cuneatus Klotzsch
- Croton cupreatus Croizat
- Croton cupreolepis P.E.Berry, B.W.van Ee & Kainul.
- Croton cupreus Elmer
- Croton cupulifer McVaugh
- Croton curiosus Croizat
- Croton curranii S.F.Blake
- Croton curvipes Urb.
- Croton cuyabensis Pilg.
- Croton cycloideus Borhidi & O.Muñiz

== D ==
- Croton damayeshu Y.T.Chang
- Croton danguyanus Leandri
- Croton debilis Müll.Arg.
- Croton decalobus Müll.Arg.
- Croton decalvatus Esser
- Croton decaryi Leandri
- Croton decipiens Baill.
- Croton delpyi Gagnep.
- Croton densivestitus C.T.White & W.D.Francis
- Croton deserticola Steyerm.
- Croton desertorum Müll.Arg.
- Croton diasii Pires ex Secco & P.E.Berry
- Croton dibindi Pellegr.
- Croton dichogamus Pax
- Croton dichromifolius P.I.Forst.
- Croton dichrous Müll.Arg.
- Croton dictyophlebodes Radcl.-Sm.
- Croton dinghuensis H.S.Kiu
- Croton dioicus Cav. - grassland croton
- Croton discolor Willd.
- Croton disjunctus V.W.Steinm.
- Croton dispar N.E.Br.
- Croton dissectistipulatus Secco
- Croton dissimilis Baill.
- Croton dockrillii Airy Shaw
- Croton doctoris S.Moore
- Croton dodecamerus Gagnep.
- Croton domatifer Riina & P.E.Berry
- Croton dongnaiensis Pierre ex Gagnep.
- Croton doratophylloides (Croizat) G.L.Webster
- Croton doratophyllus Baill.
- Croton draco Schltdl. & Cham.
- Croton draconoides Müll.Arg.
- Croton draconopsis Müll.Arg.
- Croton dracunculoides Baill.
- Croton droguetioides Kainul. & Radcl.-Sm.
- Croton dusenii Croizat
- Croton dybowskii Hutch.

== E ==
- Croton eberhardtii Gagnep.
- Croton echinulatus (Griseb.) Croizat
- Croton echioideus Baill.
- Croton eggersii Pax
- Croton ehrenbergii Schltdl.
- Croton eichleri Müll.Arg.
- Croton ekmanii Urb.
- Croton elaeagni Baill.
- Croton elbertii Airy Shaw
- Croton elkerensis Friis & M.G.Gilbert
- Croton elliotianus Baill.
- Croton elliottii Chapm. - Elliott's croton
- Croton ellipticus Geiseler
- Croton elskensii De Wild.
- Croton eluteria (L.) W.Wright
- Croton emeliae Baill.
- Croton emporiorum Croizat
- Croton enigmaticus P.E.Berry & B.W.van Ee
- Croton ensifolius Merr.
- Croton eremophilus Müll.Arg.
- Croton ericius Leandri
- Croton ericoides Baill.
- Croton eriocladoides Müll.Arg.
- Croton erythrochilus Müll.Arg.
- Croton erythrochyloides Croizat
- Croton erythrostachys Hook.f.
- Croton erythroxyloides Baill.
- Croton eskuchei Ahumada
- Croton essequiboensis Klotzsch
- Croton euryphyllus W.W.Sm.
- Croton excisus Urb.
- Croton exuberans Müll.Arg.

== F ==
- Croton fantzianus F.Seym.
- Croton farinosus Lam.
- Croton faroensis Secco
- Croton fastuosus Baill.
- Croton fernandezii Riina & Caruzo
- Croton ferricretus Kainul., B.W.van Ee & P.E.Berry
- Croton ferruginellus Müll.Arg.
- Croton ferrugineus Kunth
- Croton fianarantsoae Leandri
- Croton fishlockii Britton
- Croton flavens L.
- Croton flaviglandulosus Lundell
- Croton flavispicatus Rusby
- Croton floccosus B.A.Sm.
- Croton floribundus Spreng.
- Croton fluviatilis Esser
- Croton fothergillifolius Baill.
- Croton fragilis Kunth
- Croton fragrans Kunth
- Croton fragrantulus Croizat
- Croton francoanus Müll.Arg.
- Croton fraseri Müll.Arg.
- Croton frieseanus Müll.Arg.
- Croton frionis Müll.Arg.
- Croton fruticulosus Torr. - encinilla, bush croton
- Croton fulvus Mart.
- Croton fuscus (Didr.) Müll.Arg.

== G ==
- Croton gageanus P.T.Li
- Croton galeopsifolius Lanj.
- Croton gaumeri Millsp.
- Croton geayi Leandri
- Croton geraesensis (Baill.) G.L.Webster
- Croton gibsonianus Nimmo
- Croton gigantifolius P.E.Berry & Secco
- Croton gilgianus Herter ex Arechav.
- Croton glabellus L.
- Croton glabrescens Miq.
- Croton glandulosepalus Millsp.
- Croton glandulosobracteatus Carn.-Torres & Cordeiro
- Croton glandulosodentatus Pax & K.Hoffm.
- Croton glandulosus L.
  - Croton glandulosus var. crenatifolius
  - Croton glandulosus var. floridanus
  - Croton glandulosus var. septentrionalis
  - Croton glandulosus var. simpsonii
- Croton glaziovii Müll.Arg.
- Croton glechomifolius Müll.Arg.
- Croton glomeratus Aug.DC.
- Croton glutinosus Müll.Arg.
- Croton glyptospermus Müll.Arg.
- Croton gnaphalii Baill.
- Croton gnaphaloides Schrad.
- Croton gnidiaceus Baill.
- Croton gomezii G.L.Webster
- Croton gonaivensis Urb. & Ekman
- Croton gossweileri Hutch.
- Croton gossypiifolius Vahl
- Croton goudotii Baill.
- Croton goyazensis Müll.Arg.
- Croton gracilescens Müll.Arg.
- Croton gracilior Radcl.-Sm.
- Croton gracilipes Baill.
- Croton gracilirameus M.J.Silva, Sodré & P.E.Berry
- Croton grandivelum Baill.
- Croton grangerioides Bojer ex Baill.
- Croton graomogolensis Barbosa & Carn.-Torres
- Croton gratissimus Burch.
- Croton grazielae Secco
- Croton greveanus Baill.
- Croton grewiifolius Müll.Arg.
- Croton grewioides Baill.
- Croton griffithii Hook.f.
- Croton grisebachianus Müll.Arg.
- Croton griseus Airy Shaw
- Croton grossedentatus Pittier
- Croton guaiquinimae Steyerm.
- Croton guatemalensis Lotsy
- Croton guerelae Leandri
- Croton guerreroanus Mart.Gord. & Cruz Durán
- Croton guianensis Aubl.
- Croton guildingii Griseb.
- Croton guilleminianus Baill.
- Croton gynopetalus Croizat

== H ==
- Croton habrophyllus Airy Shaw
- Croton hadriani Baill.
- Croton haitiensis P.T.Li
- Croton hancei Benth. - Hong Kong croton
- Croton harleyi Carn.-Torres & Cordeiro
- Croton harmsianus Herter ex Arechav.
- Croton hasskarlianus Müll.Arg.
- Croton hasslerianus Chodat
- Croton haumanianus J.Léonard
- Croton hecatonandrus Müll.Arg.
- Croton heliaster S.F.Blake
- Croton helichrysum Baill.
- Croton heliotropiifolius Kunth
- Croton hemiargyreus Müll.Arg.
- Croton hentyi Airy Shaw
- Croton heptalon (Kuntze) B.W.van Ee & P.E.Berry
- Croton herzogianus (Pax & K.Hoffm.) Radcl.-Sm. & Govaerts
- Croton heteranthus Aug.DC.
- Croton heterocalyx Baill.
- Croton heterocarpus Müll.Arg.
- Croton heterochrous Müll.Arg.
- Croton heterodoxus Baill.
- Croton heteroneurus Müll.Arg.
- Croton heterotrichus Müll.Arg.
- Croton hibiscifolius Kunth ex Spreng.
- Croton hieronymi Griseb.
- Croton hilarii Baill.
- Croton hildebrandtii Baill.
- Croton hircinus Vent.
- Croton hirtus L'Hér.
- Croton hoffmannii Müll.Arg.
- Croton holguinensis Borhidi
- Croton holodiscus (Croizat) Radcl.-Sm. & Govaerts
- Croton holtonii Müll.Arg.
- Croton hondensis (H.Karst.) G.L.Webster
- Croton horminum Baill.
- Croton hostmannii Miq.
- Croton hovarum Leandri
- Croton howii Merr. & Chun ex Y.T.Chang
- Croton huajuapanensis Mart.Gord. & Cruz Durán
- Croton huberi Steyerm.
- Croton huitotorum Croizat
- Croton humbertii Leandri
- Croton humblotii Baill.
- Croton humilis L. - pepperbush
- Croton hutchinsonianus Hosseus
- Croton hypochalibaeus Baill.
- Croton hypoleucus Schltdl.

== I ==
- Croton icabarui Jabl.
- Croton icche Lundell
- Croton ichthygaster L.B.Sm. & Downs
- Croton ignifex Croizat
- Croton ihosianus Leandri
- Croton imbricatus L.R.Lima & Pirani
- Croton impressus Urb.
- Croton inaequilobus Steyerm.
- Croton incanus Kunth
- Croton incertus Müll.Arg.
- Croton incisus Baill.
- Croton indivisus Vell.
- Croton indrisilvae Kainul., B.W.van Ee & P.E.Berry
- Croton inhambanensis Radcl.-Sm.
- Croton inops Baill.
- Croton insularis Baill. - Queensland's cascarilla
- Croton integrifolius Pax
- Croton integrilobus Croizat
- Croton intercedens Müll.Arg.
- Croton isabellei Baill.
- Croton isalensis (Leandri) Leandri
- Croton isomonensis Leandri
- Croton itacolumii Müll.Arg.
- Croton iteophyllus Radcl.-Sm. & Govaerts
- Croton ituzaingensis Ahumada
- Croton itzaeus Lundell

== J ==
- Croton jacmelianus Urb.
- Croton jacobinensis Baill.
- Croton jamaicensis B.W.van Ee & P.E.Berry
- Croton jamesonii Müll.Arg.
- Croton janeirensis Radcl.-Sm. & Govaerts
- Croton jansii J.Léonard
- Croton jatrophifolius Müll.Arg.
- Croton jatrophoides Pax
- Croton jaucoensis Borhidi
- Croton javarisensis Secco
- Croton jennyanus Gris ex Baill.
- Croton jimenezii Standl. & Valerio
- Croton jorgei J.Murillo
- Croton josephina Müll.Arg.
- Croton joufra Roxb.
- Croton jucundus Brandegee
- Croton julopsidium Baill.
- Croton junceus Baill.
- Croton jutiapensis Croizat

== K ==
- Croton kalkmannii Müll.Arg.
- Croton kaloae Croizat
- Croton kelantanicus Airy Shaw
- Croton kerrii Airy Shaw
- Croton killipianus Croizat
- Croton kilwae Radcl.-Sm.
- Croton kimosorum Leandri
- Croton klaenzei Müll.Arg.
- Croton kleinii L.B.Sm. & Downs
- Croton klotzschianus (Wight) Thwaites
- Croton kongensis Gagnep.
- Croton kongkandanus Esser
- Croton krabas Gagnep.
- Croton krukoffianus Croizat
- Croton kurzii Croizat

== L ==
- Croton laceratoglandulosus Caruzo & Cordeiro
- Croton lachnocarpus Benth.
- Croton lachnocladus Mart. ex Müll.Arg.
- Croton lachnostachyus Baill.
- Croton laciniatistylus J.Léonard
- Croton laeticapsulus Croizat
- Croton laevigatus Vahl
- Croton lagoensis Müll.Arg.
- Croton lamdongensis Thin
- Croton lanatus Lam.
- Croton lanceilimbus Merr.
- Croton landoltii Ahumada
- Croton langsdorffii Müll.Arg.
- Croton langsonensis Thin
- Croton laniflorus Geiseler
- Croton laoticus Gagnep.
- Croton lapanus Müll.Arg.
- Croton laseguei Müll.Arg.
- Croton lasiopetaloides Croizat
- Croton lasiopyrus Baill.
- Croton latsonensis Gagnep.
- Croton laui Merr. & F.P.Metcalf
- Croton lauioides Radcl.-Sm. & Govaerts
- Croton laureltyanus Ahumada
- Croton laurifolius Spach ex Baill.
- Croton laurinus Sw.
- Croton lawianus Nimmo ex Dalzell & A.Gibson
- Croton lechleri Müll.Arg.
- Croton lehmannii Pax
- Croton leiophyllus Müll.Arg.
- Croton lenheirensis D.Medeiros, L.Senna & R.J.V.Alves
- Croton leonensis Hutch.
- Croton leonis (Croizat) B.W.van Ee & P.E.Berry
- Croton lepidus (S.Moore) Radcl.-Sm. & Govaerts
- Croton leptanthus Airy Shaw
- Croton leptophyllus Müll.Arg.
- Croton leptopus Müll.Arg.
- Croton leptostachyus Kunth
- Croton leuconeurus Pax
- Croton leucophlebius C.Wright ex Griseb.
- Croton leucophyllus Müll.Arg. - two-color croton
- Croton levatii Guillaumin
- Croton leytensis Croizat
- Croton lichenisilvae Leandri
- Croton liebmannii Müll.Arg.
- Croton limae A.P.S.Gomes, M.F.Sales & P.E.Berry
- Croton limnocharis Croizat
- Croton lindheimeri (Engelm. & A.Gray) Alph.Wood
- Croton lindheimerianus Scheele
- Croton lindmanii Urb.
- Croton lindquistii V.W.Steinm.
- Croton linearifolius Müll.Arg.
- Croton linearis Jacq. - grannybush
- Croton lissophyllus Radcl.-Sm. & Govaerts ex Esser
- Croton lombardianus Croizat
- Croton longibracteatus Mart.Gord. & de Luna
- Croton longicarpus A.P.N.Pereira, Caruzo & Riina
- Croton longicolumellus B.W.van Ee & P.E.Berry
- Croton longifolius Müll.Arg.
- Croton longipedicellatus J.Léonard
- Croton longiracemosus Hutch.
- Croton longissimus Airy Shaw
- Croton loretensis Riina & Caruzo
- Croton lotorius Croizat
- Croton loucoubensis Baill.
- Croton loukandensis Pellegr.
- Croton lucens P.I.Forst.
- Croton luciae Croizat
- Croton lucidus L.
- Croton luetzelburgii Pax & K.Hoffm.
- Croton lundianus (Didr.) Müll.Arg.
- Croton luzoniensis Müll.Arg.

== M ==
- Croton maasii Riina & P.E.Berry
- Croton macbridei Croizat
- Croton macradenis Görts & Punt
- Croton macrobothrys Baill.
- Croton macrobuxus Baill.
- Croton macrocarpus Ridl.
- Croton macrodontus Müll.Arg.
- Croton macrolepis Radcl.-Sm. & Govaerts
- Croton macrosepalus Sodré & M.J.Silva
- Croton macrostachyus Hochst. ex Delile
- Croton macrostigma Chodat
- Croton maculatus Vahl
- Croton madandensis S.Moore
- Croton maestrensis (Alain) B.W.van Ee & P.E.Berry
- Croton maevaranensis Leandri
- Croton magdalenae Millsp. - Dragon's blood
- Croton magneticus Airy Shaw
- Croton magnifolius Sessé & Moc.
- Croton malabaricus Bedd.
- Croton malacotrichus Müll.Arg.
- Croton malambo H.Karst.
- Croton mallotophyllus Croizat
- Croton malvaviscifolius Millsp.
- Croton malvoides (Croizat) Radcl.-Sm. & Govaerts
- Croton mamillatus P.I.Forst.
- Croton manampetsae Leandri
- Croton mansfeldii Urb.
- Croton martinianus V.W.Steinmann
- Croton martinicensis Urb.
- Croton masonii I.M.Johnst.
- Croton matourensis Aubl.
- Croton matudae Lundell
- Croton mauritianus Lam.
- Croton mavoravina Leandri
- Croton mayanus B.L.León & H.F.M.Vester
- Croton mayottae P.E.Berry & Kainul.
- Croton mayumbensis J.Léonard
- Croton mazapensis Lundell
- Croton mcvaughii G.L.Webster
- Croton medusae Müll.Arg.
- Croton meeboldianus Chakrab. & N.P.Balakr.
- Croton megaladenus Urb.
- Croton megalobotryoides De Wild.
- Croton megalobotrys Müll.Arg.
- Croton megalocalyx Müll.Arg.
- Croton megalocarpoides Friis & M.G.Gilbert
- Croton megalocarpus Hutch.
- Croton megalodendron Müll.Arg.
- Croton megistocarpus J.A.González & Poveda
- Croton meissneri Müll.Arg.
- Croton mekongensis Gagnep.
- Croton melanoleucus Müll.Arg.
- Croton membranaceus Müll.Arg.
- Croton menabeensis Leandri
- Croton menarandrae Leandri
- Croton menthodorus Benth.
- Croton menyharthii Pax
- Croton meridionalis Leandri
- Croton merrillianus Croizat
- Croton metallicus Müll.Arg.
- Croton mexicanus Müll.Arg.
- Croton miarensis Leandri
- Croton micans Sw.
- Croton michaelii V.W.Steinm.
- Croton michauxii G.L.Webster
- Croton micradenus Urb.
- Croton microcarpus Ham.
- Croton microgyne Croizat
- Croton microphyllinus Radcl.-Sm. & Govaerts
- Croton microtiglium Burkill
- Croton milanjensis Leandri
- Croton millspaughii Standl.
- Croton minimimarginiglandulosus Radcl.-Sm.
- Croton minimus P.I.Forst.
- Croton miradorensis Müll.Arg.
- Croton miraflorensis Borhidi
- Croton mocquerysii Aug.DC.
- Croton mollis Benth.
- Croton monanthogynus Michx.
- Croton mongue Baill.
- Croton monogynus Urb.
- Croton montevidensis Spreng.
- Croton montis-silam Airy Shaw
- Croton moonii Thwaites
- Croton morifolius Willd.
- Croton morobensis Croizat
- Croton morotaeus Airy Shaw
- Croton moustiquensis Urb.
- Croton mubango Müll.Arg.
- Croton mucronifolius Müll.Arg.
- Croton muellerianus L.R.Lima
- Croton multicaulis P.I.Forst.
- Croton multicostatus Müll.Arg.
- Croton multiramineus Ahumada
- Croton munizii Borhidi
- Croton muricatus Vahl
- Croton muriculatus Airy Shaw
- Croton muscicapa Müll.Arg.
- Croton mutabilis P.I.Forst.
- Croton mutisianus Kunth
- Croton myrianthus Müll.Arg.
- Croton myriaster Baker
- Croton myricifolius Griseb.
- Croton myriodontus Müll.Arg.
- Croton myrsinites Baill.

== N ==
- Croton neblinae Jabl.
- Croton nepalensis T.Kuros.
- Croton nepetifolius Baill.
- Croton neuwiedii Müll.Arg.
- Croton nigricans (Mart. ex Schltdl.) Radcl.-Sm. & Govaerts
- Croton nigritanus Scott Elliot
- Croton nigroviridis Thwaites
- Croton nirguensis Riina & W.Meier
- Croton nitens Sw.
- Croton nitidulifolius Croizat
- Croton nitidulus Baker
- Croton nitrariifolius Baill.
- Croton niveus Jacq.
- Croton nivifer S.Moore
- Croton nobilis Baill.
- Croton noronhae Baill.
- Croton novae-astigis Croizat
- Croton novi-friburgi Müll.Arg.
- Croton nubigenus G.L.Webster
- Croton nudatus Baill.
- Croton nudulus Croizat
- Croton nummularius Baill.
- Croton nuntians Croizat

== O ==
- Croton oblongus Burm.f.
- Croton odontadenius Müll.Arg.
- Croton oerstedianus Müll.Arg.
- Croton olanchanus Standl. & L.O.Williams
- Croton oleoides Müll.Arg.
- Croton oligandrus Pierre ex Hutch.
- Croton oliganthus Müll.Arg.
- Croton olivaceus Müll.Arg.
- Croton ophiticola Borhidi
- Croton orangeae Kainul. & P.E.Berry
- Croton orbicularis Thunb.
- Croton orbignyanus Müll.Arg.
- Croton organensis Baill.
- Croton orientensis Borhidi
- Croton origanifolius Lam.
- Croton orinocensis Müll.Arg.
- Croton ortegae Standl.
- Croton ortholobus Müll.Arg.
- Croton ovalifolius Vahl

== P ==
- Croton pachecensis S.Moore
- Croton pachypodus G.L.Webster
- Croton pachyrachis Alain
- Croton pachysepalus Griseb.
- Croton pagiveteris Croizat
- Croton palanostigma Klotzsch
- Croton palawanensis Merr. ex Croizat
- Croton pallidus Müll.Arg.
- Croton palmatus Sessé & Moc.
- Croton palmeri S.Watson
- Croton paludosus Müll.Arg.
- Croton pampangensis Croizat
- Croton panduriformis Müll.Arg.
- Croton pannosus Thunb.
- Croton paraensis Müll.Arg.
- Croton paraguayensis Chodat
- Croton parksii Croizat - Park's croton
- Croton parodianus Croizat
- Croton parvifolius Müll.Arg.
- Croton pascualii E.J.Lott & Mart.Gord.
- Croton patrum L.B.Sm. & Downs
- Croton paucistamineus Müll.Arg.
- Croton pavonianus Radcl.-Sm. & Govaerts
- Croton pavonis Müll.Arg.
- Croton paxianus Herter ex Arechav.
- Croton payaquensis Standl.
- Croton pedersenii Ahumada
- Croton pedicellatus Kunth
- Croton pedunculatus Vell.
- Croton peekelii Lauterb.
- Croton pellitus Kunth
- Croton peltatus Thunb.
- Croton peltophorus Müll.Arg.
- Croton pendens Lundell
- Croton penduliflorus Hutch.
- Croton penninervis Scheele
- Croton peraeruginosus Croizat
- Croton perimetralensis Secco
- Croton perintricatus Croizat
- Croton perlongiflorus Croizat
- Croton persimilis Müll.Arg.
- Croton perspeciosus Croizat
- Croton perstipulatus G.L.Webster ex Caruzo & Secco
- Croton peruvianus Briq.
- Croton pervestitus C.Wright ex Griseb.
- Croton perviscosus Croizat
- Croton petraeus Müll.Arg.
- Croton phaenodon Airy Shaw
- Croton phebalioides F.Muell. ex Müll.Arg.
- Croton phourinii H.Toyama & Tagane
- Croton phuquocensis Croizat
- Croton phyllanthus (Chodat & Hassl.) G.L.Webster
- Croton piauhiensis Müll.Arg.
- Croton pilgeri Ule
- Croton pilophorus Airy Shaw
- Croton pilosus Spreng.
- Croton pilulifer Rusby
- Croton piptocalyx Müll.Arg.
- Croton plagiograptus Müll.Arg.
- Croton planaltoanus M.J.Silva & Sodré
- Croton platyphyllus Lundell
- Croton pleytei Airy Shaw
- Croton plurispicatus P.E.Berry, Kainul. & B.W.van Ee
- Croton poecilanthus Urb.
- Croton poggei Pax
- Croton poilanei Gagnep.
- Croton poitaei Urb.
- Croton polot Burm.f.
- Croton polyandrus Spreng.
- Croton polygonoides L.B.Sm. & Downs
- Croton polypleurus Croizat
- Croton polytomus Urb.
- Croton polytrichus Pax
- Croton pontis Croizat
- Croton poomae Esser
- Croton potabilis Croizat
- Croton potaroensis Lanj.
- Croton pottsii (Klotzsch) Müll.Arg. - leatherweed
- Croton pradensis D.Medeiros, L.Senna & R.J.V.Alves
- Croton priorianus Urb.
- Croton priscus Croizat
- Croton procumbens Jacq.
- Croton promunturii Leandri
- Croton prostratus Urb.
- Croton pseudoadipatus Croizat
- Croton pseudofragrans Croizat
- Croton pseudoglabellus Lundell
- Croton pseudoniloticus De Wild.
- Croton pseudoniveus Lundell
- Croton pseudopopulus Baill.
- Croton pseudopulchellus Pax
- Croton pulcher Müll.Arg.
- Croton pulegioides Müll.Arg.
- Croton pullei Lanj.
- Croton punctatus Jacq. - Gulf croton
- Croton puncticulatus Müll.Arg.
- Croton pungens Jacq.
- Croton purdiei Müll.Arg.
- Croton purpurascens Y.T.Chang
- Croton pycnadenius Müll.Arg.
- Croton pycnanthus Benth.
- Croton pycnocephalus Baill.
- Croton pycnophyllus Salzm. ex Schltdl.
- Croton pygmaeus L.R.Lima
- Croton pynaertii De Wild.
- Croton pyrifolius Müll.Arg.
- Croton pyrosoma (Croizat) Radcl.-Sm. & Govaerts

== Q ==
- Croton quadrisetosus Lam.
- Croton quercetorum Croizat
- Croton quintasii Allem
- Croton quisumbingianus Croizat

== R ==
- Croton radiatus P.E.Berry & Kainul.
- Croton radlkoferi Pax & K.Hoffm.
- Croton rakotoniainii Leandri
- Croton ramboi Allem
- Croton ramellae Ahumada
- Croton ramillatus Croizat
- Croton ramosissimus Sodré & M.J.Silva
- Croton rarus P.I.Forst.
- Croton rectipilis Croizat
- Croton redolens Pittier
- Croton reflexifolius Kunth
- Croton refractus Müll.Arg.
- Croton regeneratrix Leandri
- Croton rehderianus Croizat
- Croton reitzii L.B.Sm. & Downs
- Croton repens Schltdl.
- Croton revolutus (Alain) B.W.van Ee & P.E.Berry
- Croton rhamnifolioides Pax & K.Hoffm.
- Croton rheophyticus Airy Shaw
- Croton rhexiifolius Baill.
- Croton rhodostachyus Müll.Arg.
- Croton rhodotrichus Sodré & M.J.Silva
- Croton rimbachii Croizat
- Croton ripensis Kaneh. & Hatus.
- Croton rivinifolius Kunth
- Croton rivularis Müll.Arg.
- Croton rizzinii Farias & Riina
- Croton roborensis Standl.
- Croton robustior (L.B.Sm. & Downs) Radcl.-Sm. & Govaerts
- Croton robustus Kurz
- Croton roraimensis Croizat
- Croton rosarianus Mart.Gord. & Cruz Durán
- Croton rosmarinoides Millsp.
- Croton rottlerifolius Baill.
- Croton rotundifolius Sessé & Moc.
- Croton roxanae Croizat
- Croton rubiginosus Croizat
- Croton rudolphianus Müll.Arg.
- Croton rufoargenteus Müll.Arg.
- Croton rufolepidotus Caruzo & Riina
- Croton ruizianus Müll.Arg.
- Croton rupestris (Chodat & Hassl.) G.L.Webster
- Croton rusbyi Britton ex Rusby
- Croton russulus Croizat
- Croton rutilus (Chodat & Hassl.) G.L.Webster

== S ==
- Croton sacaquinha Croizat
- Croton sagranus Müll.Arg.
- Croton sahafariensis Kainul. & P.E.Berry
- Croton saipanensis Hosok.
- Croton sakamaliensis Leandri
- Croton saltensis Griseb.
- Croton salutaris Casar.
- Croton salviformis Baill.
- Croton salzmannii (Baill.) G.L.Webster
- Croton samarensis Airy Shaw
- Croton sampatik Müll.Arg.
- Croton sanctae-crucis S.Moore
- Croton sancti-lazari Croizat
- Croton santamartensis Riina & P.E.Berry
- Croton santaritensis Huft
- Croton santisukii Airy Shaw
- Croton santolinus Baill.
- Croton sapiiflorus Croizat
- Croton sapiifolius Müll.Arg.
- Croton sarcocarpus Balf.f.
- Croton sarcopetaloides S.Moore
- Croton scaber Willd.
- Croton scabiosus Bedd.
- Croton scheffleri Pax
- Croton schiedeanus Schltdl.
- Croton schimperianus Müll.Arg.
- Croton schultesii Müll.Arg.
- Croton schultzii Benth.
- Croton sclerocalyx (Didr.) Müll.Arg.
- Croton scopuligenus Croizat
- Croton scoriarum Leandri
- Croton scouleri Hook.f.
- Croton scutatus P.E.Berry
- Croton seccoi Sodré & M.J.Silva
- Croton sellowii Baill.
- Croton seminudus Müll.Arg.
- Croton semivestitus Müll.Arg.
- Croton senescens Croizat
- Croton sepalinus Airy Shaw
- Croton seretii Vermoesen ex De Wild.
- Croton serpyllifolius Baill.
- Croton serratifolius Baill.
- Croton serratus Müll.Arg.
- Croton setiger Hook.
- Croton sexmetralis Croizat
- Croton shreveanus Croizat
- Croton sibundoyensis Croizat
- Croton siderophyllus Baill.
- Croton sidifolius Lam.
- Croton siltepecensis Lundell
- Croton silvanus Croizat
- Croton simulans P.I.Forst.
- Croton sincorensis Mart. ex Müll.Arg.
- Croton singularis Airy Shaw
- Croton sipaliwinensis Lanj.
- Croton smithianus Croizat
- Croton socotranus Balf.f.
- Croton solanaceus (Müll.Arg.) G.L.Webster
- Croton soliman Schltdl. & Cham.
- Croton somalensis Pax
- Croton sonderianus Müll.Arg.
- Croton sonorae Torr.
- Croton soratensis Müll.Arg.
- Croton sousae Mart.Gord. & Cruz Durán
- Croton speciosus Müll.Arg.
- Croton sphaerogynus Baill.
- Croton spica Baill.
- Croton spiciflorus Thunb.
- Croton spiralis Müll.Arg.
- Croton spissirameus Radcl.-Sm. & Govaerts
- Croton splendidus Mart.
- Croton spruceanus Benth.
- Croton spurcus Croizat
- Croton stahelianus Lanj.
- Croton staminosus Müll.Arg.
- Croton standleyanus Croizat
- Croton stanneus Baill.
- Croton steenkampianus Gerstner
- Croton stellatoferrugineus Caruzo & Cordeiro
- Croton stellatopilosus H.Ohba
- Croton stellulifer Hutch.
- Croton stenopetalus G.L.Webster
- Croton stenophyllus Griseb.
- Croton stenosepalus Müll.Arg.
- Croton stenotrichus Müll.Arg.
- Croton stigmatosus F.Muell.
- Croton stipulaceus Kunth
- Croton stipularis (Müll.Arg.) G.L.Webster
- Croton stipulatus Vell.
- Croton stockeri (Airy Shaw) Airy Shaw
- Croton stoechadis Baill.
- Croton stylosus Müll.Arg.
- Croton suaveolens Torr.
- Croton suavis Kunth
- Croton subacutus (Baill.) Müll.Arg.
- Croton subasperrimum Secco, P.E.Berry & Rosário
- Croton subcinerellus Croizat
- Croton subcompressus Müll.Arg.
- Croton subdecumbens Borhidi & O.Muñiz
- Croton subdioecus K.Schum.
- Croton suberosus Kunth
- Croton subferrugineus Müll.Arg.
- Croton subfragilis Müll.Arg.
- Croton subglaber K.Schum.
- Croton subincanus Müll.Arg.
- Croton subjucundus Croizat
- Croton sublepidotus Müll.Arg.
- Croton sublyratus Kurz
- Croton submetallicus Baill.
- Croton subpannosus Müll.Arg. ex Griseb.
- Croton subsuavis Croizat
- Croton subvillosus Müll.Arg.
- Croton sucrensis Steyerm.
- Croton sulcifructus Balf.f.
- Croton sumatranus Miq.
- Croton sutup Lundell
- Croton suyapensis Ant.Molina
- Croton sylvaticus Hochst.

== T ==
- Croton tabascensis Lundell
- Croton tacanensis Lundell
- Croton talaeporos Radcl.-Sm.
- Croton tanalorum Leandri
- Croton tarapotensis Müll.Arg.
- Croton tardeflorens Leandri
- Croton tartonraira Müll.Arg.
- Croton tartonrairoides Pax & K.Hoffm.
- Croton tchibangensis Pellegr.
- Croton tejucensis Müll.Arg.
- Croton tenellus Müll.Arg.
- Croton tenuicaudatus Lundell
- Croton tenuicaulis B.W.van Ee & P.E.Berry
- Croton tenuifolius Pax & K.Hoffm.
- Croton tenuilobus S.Watson
- Croton terminalis Vell.
- Croton tessmannii Mansf.
- Croton tetradenius Baill.
- Croton texensis (Klotzsch) Müll.Arg. - Texas croton
- Croton thellungianus (Herter ex Arechav.) Radcl.-Sm. & Govaerts
- Croton thoii Thin
- Croton thomasii Riina & P.E.Berry
- Croton thorelii Gagnep.
- Croton thouarsianus Baill.
- Croton thurifer Kunth
- Croton thymelinus Baill.
- Croton tiglium L.
- Croton tiliifolius Lam.
- Croton timandroides (Didr.) Müll.Arg.
- Croton timotensis Pittier
- Croton tocantinsensis Radcl.-Sm. & Govaerts
- Croton toliarensis B.W.van Ee & Kainul.
- Croton tomentellus F.Muell.
- Croton tonantinensis Jabl.
- Croton tonduzii Pax
- Croton touranensis Gagnep.
- Croton tremulifolius Croizat
- Croton triacros F.Muell.
- Croton triangularis Müll.Arg.
- Croton trichophilus (Pax & K.Hoffm.) Radcl.-Sm. & Govaerts
- Croton trichotomus Geiseler
- Croton tricolor Klotzsch ex Baill.
- Croton tridentatus Mart. ex Müll.Arg.
- Croton triglandulatus Vell.
- Croton trigonocarpus Griseb.
- Croton trinitatis Millsp.
- Croton triqueter Lam.
- Croton trombetensis Secco, P.E.Berry & N.A.Rosa
- Croton troncosoi Ahumada
- Croton tsiampiensis Leandri
- Croton tuerckheimii Donn.Sm.
- Croton tumbesinus Riina
- Croton turumiquirensis Steyerm.
- Croton tyndaridum Croizat

== U ==
- Croton uliginosus Sodré & M.J.Silva
- Croton umbratilis Kunth
- Croton uribei Croizat
- Croton urticifolius Lam.
- Croton urucurana Baill.
- Croton uruguayensis Baill.
- Croton ustulatus Radcl.-Sm.

== V ==
- Croton vaccinioides A.Rich.
- Croton vaillantii Geiseler
- Croton varelae V.W.Steinm.
- Croton vatomandrensis Leandri
- Croton vaughanii Croizat
- Croton vauthierianus Baill.
- Croton velame Müll.Arg.
- Croton vellozianus Müll.Arg.
- Croton velutinus Baill.
- Croton venturii Croizat
- Croton verapazensis Donn.Sm.
- Croton verbascoides G.L.Webster
- Croton verbenifolius Müll.Arg.
- Croton vergarenae (Jabl.) Gillespie
- Croton vermoesenii De Wild.
- Croton verreauxii Baill.
- Croton verrucosus Radcl.-Sm. & Govaerts
- Croton versicolor Müll.Arg.
- Croton verticillatus Sessé & Moc.
- Croton vestitus Spreng.
- Croton vidalii Airy Shaw
- Croton vietnamensis Radcl.-Sm. & Govaerts
- Croton villosissimus (Chodat & Hassl.) Radcl.-Sm. & Govaerts
- Croton viminalis Griseb.
- Croton virgultosus Müll.Arg.
- Croton viridulus (Croizat) Radcl.-Sm. & Govaerts
- Croton virletianus Müll.Arg.
- Croton viroleoides P.E.Berry & Secco
- Croton vogelianus Airy Shaw
- Croton vulnerarius Baill.
- Croton vulpinus Sessé & Moc.

== W ==
- Croton wagneri Müll.Arg.
- Croton wallichii Müll.Arg.
- Croton waltherioides Urb.
- Croton wassi-kussae Croizat
- Croton waterhouseae P.I.Forst.
- Croton watsonii Standl.
- Croton websteri M.J.Martinez Gordillo & J.Jiménez Ram.
- Croton wellensii De Wild.
- Croton widgrenianus Müll.Arg.
- Croton wigginsii L.C.Wheeler
- Croton wissmannii O.Schwartz
- Croton womersleyi Airy Shaw

== X ==
- Croton xalapensis Kunth
- Croton xanthochylus Croizat

== Y ==
- Croton yanhuii Y.T.Chang
- Croton yavitensis Croizat
- Croton yecorensis V.W.Steinmann & Felger
- Croton yerbalium Chodat & Hassl.
- Croton ynesae Croizat
- Croton ysabelae Croizat
- Croton yucatanensis Lundell
- Croton yungensis Croizat
- Croton yunnanensis W.W.Sm.

== Z ==
- Croton zambalensis Merr.
- Croton zavaletae Conz. ex Rzed. & al.
- Croton zeylanicus Müll.Arg.

== Reassigned taxa ==
- Croton aromaticus Miq., synonym of Mallotus tiliifolius (Blume) Müll.Arg.
- Croton corymbulosus (encilla, manzanilla) is no longer accepted, Croton corymbulosus var. thermophilus M.C.Johnst. is a synonym of Croton pottsii var. thermophilus (M.C.Johnst.) M.C.Johnst.
- Croton echinocarpus Baill. is a synonym of Croton grandivelum Baill.
- Croton oblongifolius Sieber ex Spreng. is a synonym for Chrozophora tinctoria (L.) A.Juss.
- Croton setigerus is no longer accepted
- Croton torreyanus Müll.Arg. (Torrey's croton) is now a synonym of Croton incanus Kunth
- Croton variegatum is no longer accepted
