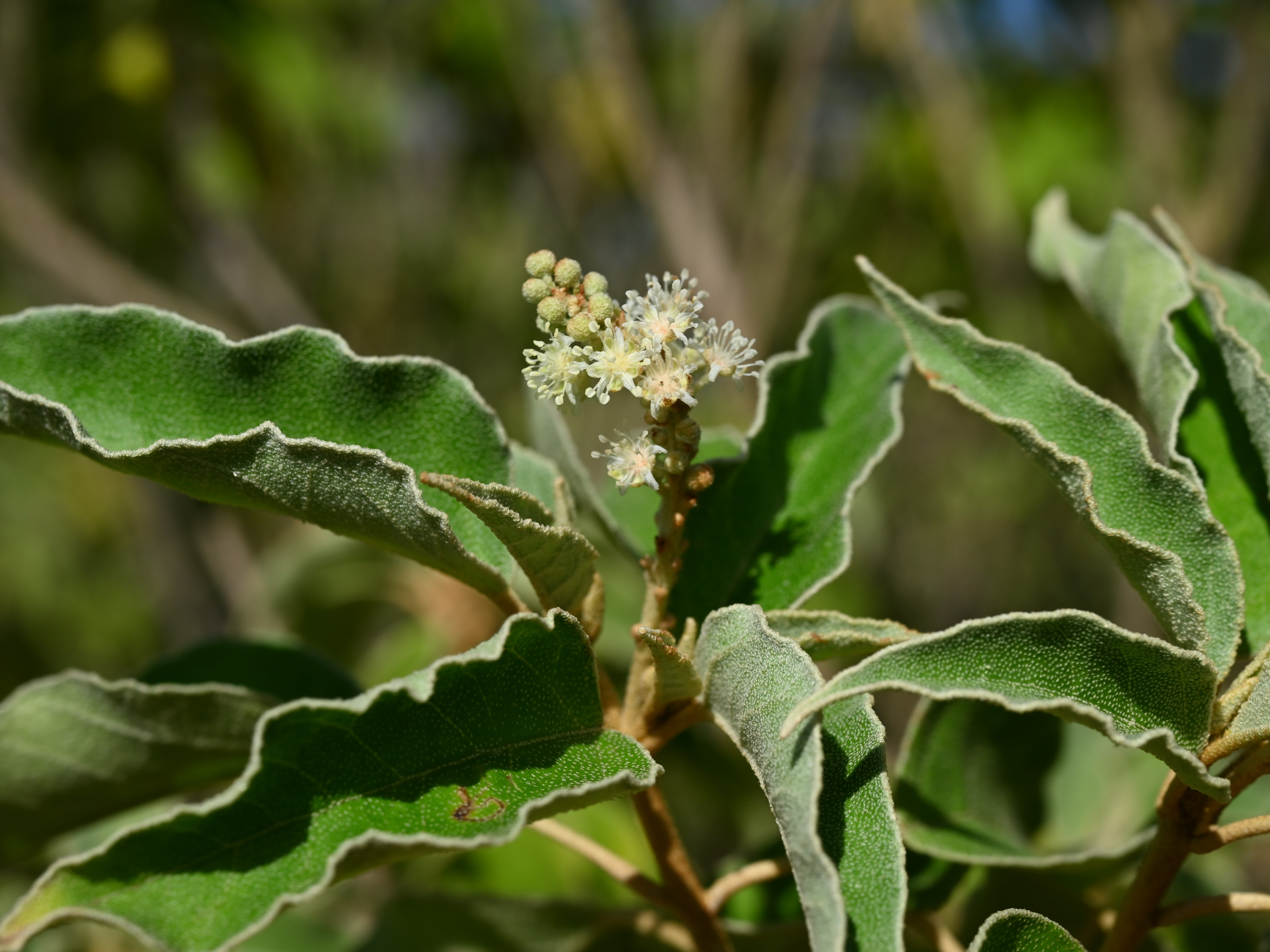
- Croton flavens in Guadeloupe

Scientific classification
- Kingdom: Plantae
- Clade: Tracheophytes
- Clade: Angiosperms
- Clade: Eudicots
- Clade: Rosids
- Order: Malpighiales
- Family: Euphorbiaceae
- Genus: Croton
- Species: C. flavens

Binomial name
- Croton flavens L.

Synonyms
- List: Croton abeggii Urb. & Ekman; Croton althaeifolius Mill.; Croton astroites Willd.; Croton balsamifer Jacq.; Croton excisus Urb.; Croton flavens var. balsamifer (Jacq.) Müll.Arg.; Croton flavens var. genuinus Müll.Arg., not validly publ.; Croton flavens var. mucronatus (Willd.) Müll.Arg.; Croton flavens var. pallidus Müll.Arg.; Croton flavens var. rigidus Müll.Arg.; Croton flavens f. richardii Griseb.; Croton flocculosus Geiseler; Croton jacmelianus Urb.; Croton leprosus Spreng. ex Griseb., nom. illeg.; Croton martinicensis Urb.; Croton mauralis E.H.L.Krause; Croton mucronatus Willd.; Croton padifolius Geiseler; Croton portoricensis P.T.Li, nom. illeg.; Croton priorianus Urb.; Croton rhamnifolius var. antillanus Müll.Arg.; Croton richardii Willd.; Croton rigidus (Müll.Arg.) Britton; Croton stenophyllus var. brevifolius Müll.Arg.; Croton tenuiramis Urb.; Croton tomentosus Sessé & Moc., nom. illeg.; Oxydectes althaeifolia (Mill.) Kuntze; Oxydectes astroites (Willd.) Kuntze; Oxydectes flavens (L.) Kuntze; Oxydectes flocculosa (Geiseler) Kuntze; Semilta althaeifolia (Mill.) Raf.

= Croton flavens =

Species of plant

Croton flavens is a species of flowering plant in the genus Croton and the family Euphorbiaceae, native to southern Mexico, the Caribbean, and Venezuela. The plant is commonly found in dry locations. It has white flowers, golden sap, and is highly aromatic. It was described by Carl Linnaeus in 1759 in Systema Naturae. Its common names include yellow balsam, copaiba, maran, rock sage, ti baume, and welensali.

== Uses ==
Croton flavens has many reported uses. Its aromatic sap has been distilled for scented toiletries, and its leaves used for scrubbing dishes to remove odors or crushed to use as an insect repellent.

As traditional medicine, Croton flavens has been used to treat sore throat, earaches, leg aches, menstrual cramps, postpartum pain, pneumonia, and cholera. It has also been used to relieve pain and prevent swelling from wasp and bee stings, and to treat infected cuts and sores. Additionally, Croton flavens has been used as an herbal abortifacient. (Note: Scientific studies question the efficacy of herbal abortifacients. Abortion via herbal abortifacients can have serious— even lethal— side effects, and is not recommended by physicians.)

In Montserrat, locals have crushed and smoked Croton flavens to relieve congestion or like a tobacco product. In Curaçao, locals have crushed and chewed it like a tobacco product or used it to make tea. A research study in 1983 suggested that the chewing or drinking of the Croton flavens may be linked to increased rates of esophageal cancer in Curaçao.

Local insects utilize Croton flavens as well. The plant provides pollen and nectar to bees and butterflies such as the tropical leafwing.

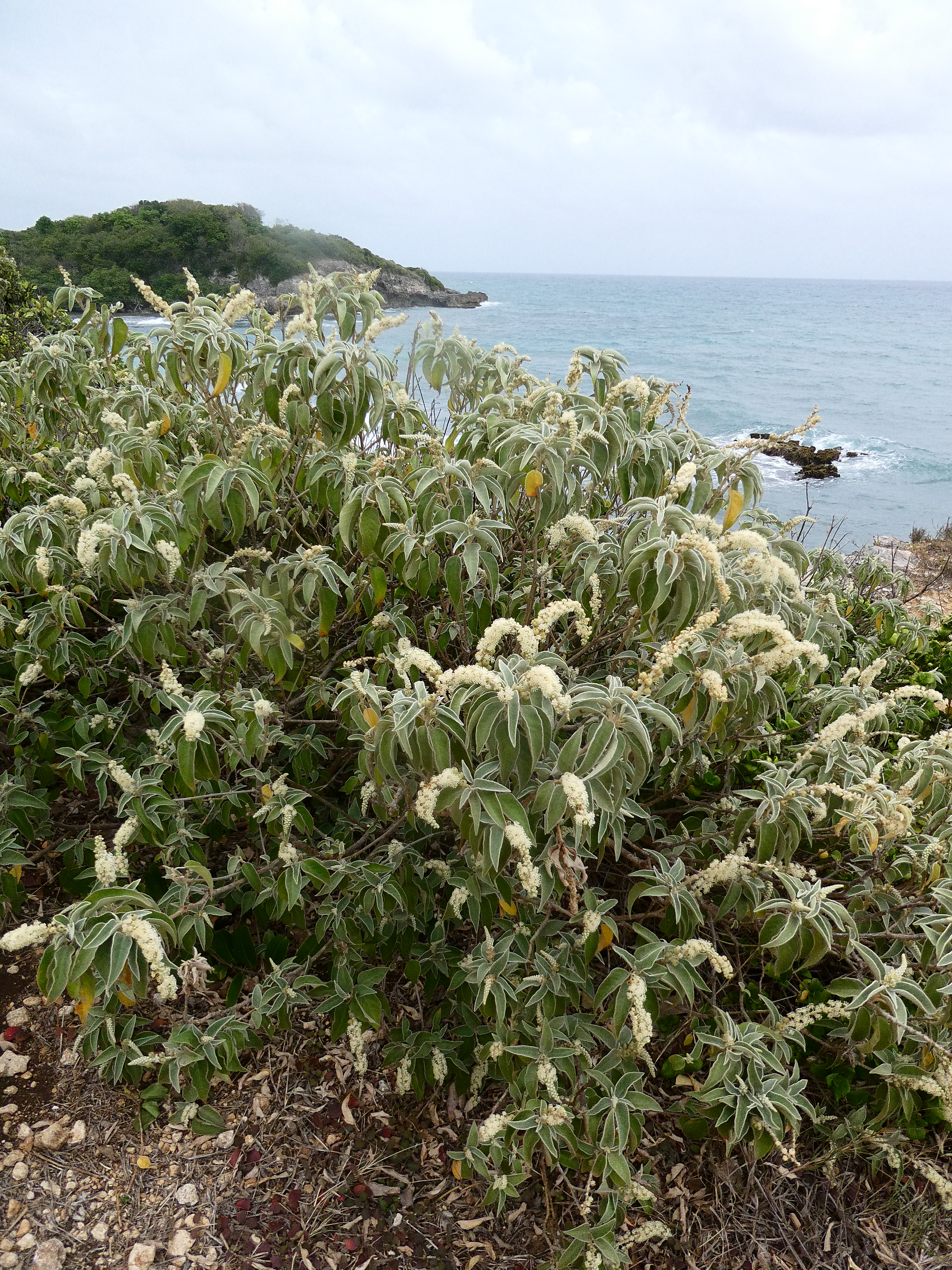
Croton flavens on Guadeloupe

== Common names ==
The common names for Croton flavens vary by region. These names include, but are not limited to, the following:

Variants of "balsam"

- balsam (Lesser Antilles)
- rock balsam (Bahamas, Barbados)
- yellow balsam (Jamaica, Cayman Islands, Dutch Caribbean)

Variants of "sage"

- sage (Lesser Antilles)
- rock sage (Lesser Antilles)
- seaside sage (Barbados)

Variants of "maran"

- maran, maran bush (U.S. Virgin Islands, Saba)
- yellow maran (British Virgin Islands).

Variants of "ti baume"

- ti baume (Guadeloupe, Martinique)
- ti bombe (Martinique)
- ti bonm (Haiti)

Other names

- bitter shrub (Dominica)
- bois l'huile (St. Barthelemy)
- copaiba (Lesser Antilles)
- copahu (French Antilles)
- copaie (Dominica)
- cough bush (Bahamas)
- palo blanco (Dominican Republic)
- palo bellaco (Dominican Republic)
- welensali (Curaçao)

== See also ==
- List of Croton species
