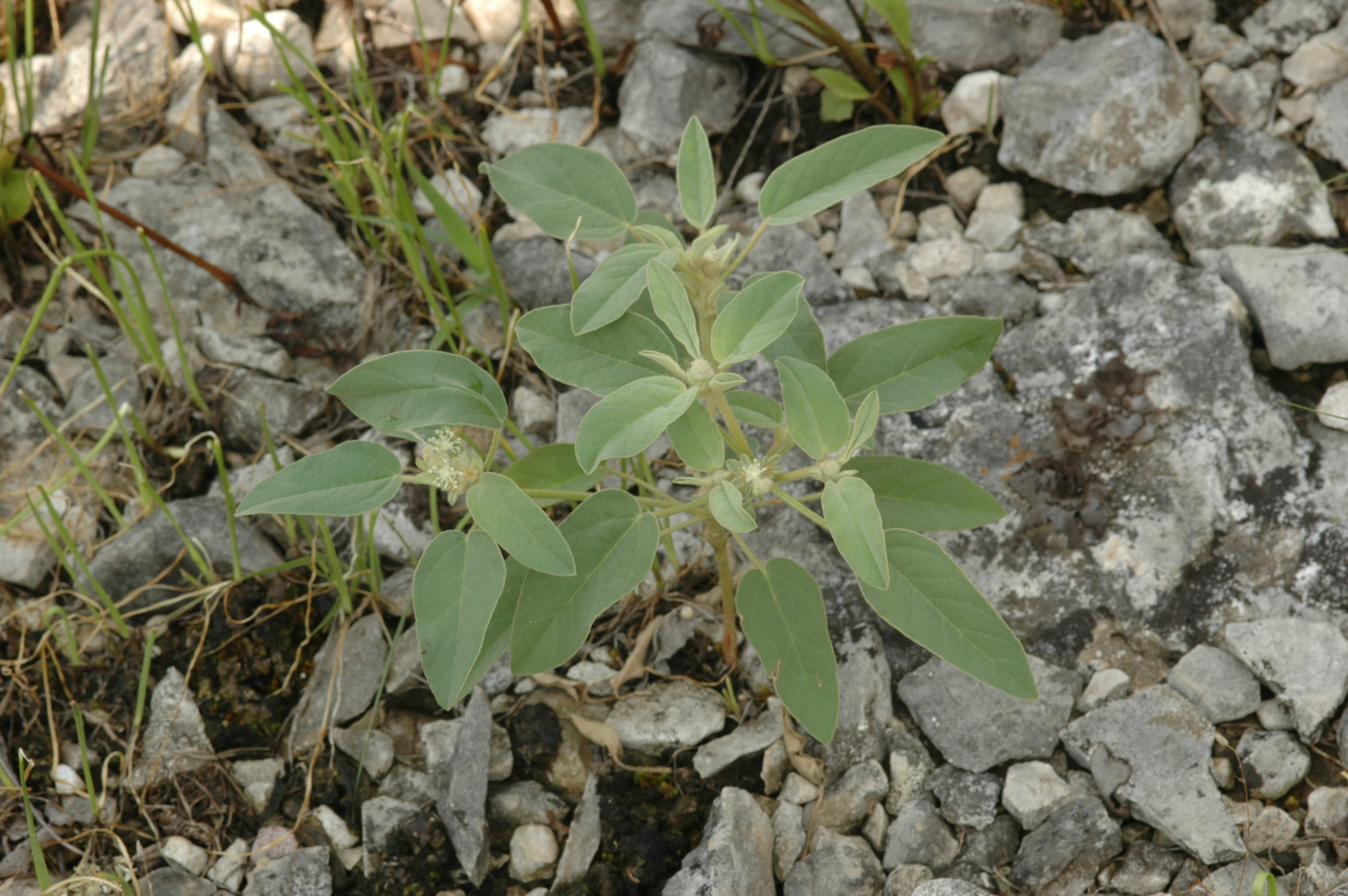

Conservation status
- Secure (NatureServe)

Scientific classification
- Kingdom: Plantae
- Clade: Tracheophytes
- Clade: Angiosperms
- Clade: Eudicots
- Clade: Rosids
- Order: Malpighiales
- Family: Euphorbiaceae
- Genus: Croton
- Species: C. capitatus

Binomial name
- Croton capitatus Michx.

= Croton capitatus =

Hogwort

Species of flowering plant

Croton capitatus, known as the hogwort, woolly croton, or goatweed, is an annual plant with erect, branched stems, densely covered with light brown, wooly hairs that give it a whitish appearance. It grows in dry, open areas, especially sandy and rocky soils. It is distributed across the eastern United States. Hogwort is a host plant for the goatweed leafwing butterfly (Anaea andria).

== In fiction ==
British author J. K. Rowling did not deliberately name Hogwarts after the hogwort. It was only after the books were published, when a friend reminded her of seeing the plant in the Kew Gardens many years beforehand, that Rowling speculated that the name had remained in her subconscious ever since.

== See also ==
- List of Croton species
