= Croton nepetifolius =

Scientific classification
- Kingdom: Plantae
- Clade: Tracheophytes
- Clade: Angiosperms
- Clade: Eudicots
- Clade: Rosids
- Order: Malpighiales
- Family: Euphorbiaceae
- Genus: Croton
- Species: C. nepetifolius

Binomial name
- Croton nepetifolius Baill., 1864

Synonyms
- Oxydectes nepetifolia (Baill.) Kuntze, 1891

Species of plant

Croton nepetifolius (Croton nepetaefolius) is an aromatic species of flowering plant in the spurge family, Euphorbiaceae, that is native to northeastern Brazil. It is commonly known as marmeleiro vermelh (red quince). The plant has been used in folk medicine as a sedative, an orexigenic (appetite enhancer) and an antispasmodic (muscle contraction suppressor).

== See also ==
- List of Croton species
