= Croton adenophorus =

Scientific classification
- Kingdom: Plantae
- Clade: Tracheophytes
- Clade: Angiosperms
- Clade: Eudicots
- Clade: Rosids
- Order: Malpighiales
- Family: Euphorbiaceae
- Genus: Croton
- Species: C. adenophorus

Binomial name
- Croton adenophorus Baill.

Synonyms
- Anisophyllum scutelligerum Boivin ex Baill., pro syn.; Croton adenophorus var. genuinus Müll.Arg., not validly publ.; Croton payerianus Baill.; Croton subaemulans Baill.; Croton tenuicuspis Baill.; Croton tulasnei Baill.; Oxydectes adenophora (Baill.) Kuntze; Oxydectes payeriana (Baill.) Kuntze; Oxydectes tulasnei (Baill.) Kuntze

Species of flowering plant

Croton adenophorus, synonym Croton subaemulans, is a species of plant of the genus Croton and the family Euphorbiaceae, native to the Comoros and Madagascar.

== See also ==
- List of Croton species
