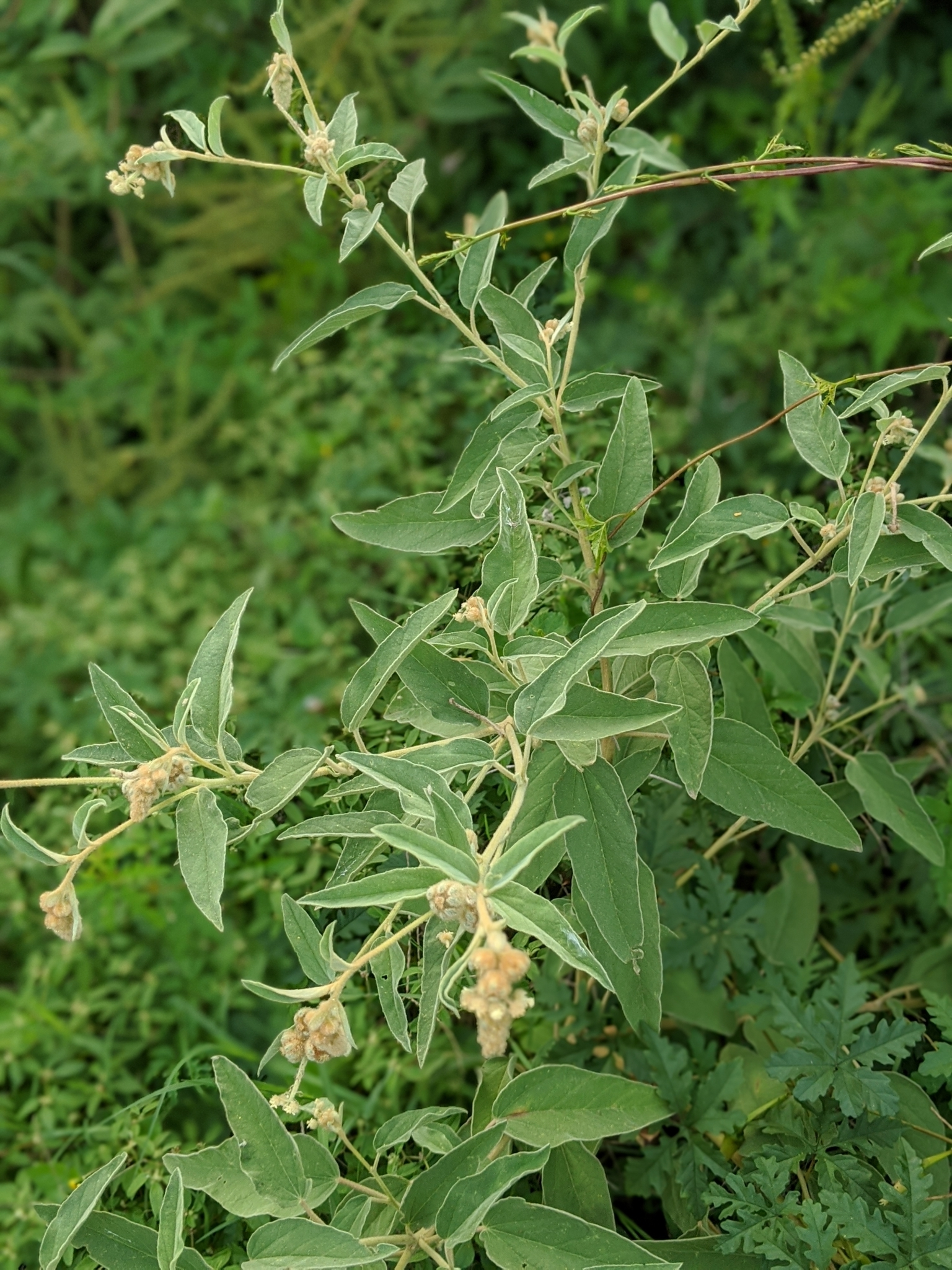

Conservation status
- Secure (NatureServe)

Scientific classification
- Kingdom: Plantae
- Clade: Tracheophytes
- Clade: Angiosperms
- Clade: Eudicots
- Clade: Rosids
- Order: Malpighiales
- Family: Euphorbiaceae
- Genus: Croton
- Species: C. lindheimeri

Binomial name
- Croton lindheimeri (Engelmann & A.Gray) Alph.Wood

= Croton lindheimeri =

Species of plant

Croton lindheimeri is a species of goatweed in the genus Croton.
