= Croton yecorensis =

Scientific classification
- Kingdom: Plantae
- Clade: Tracheophytes
- Clade: Angiosperms
- Clade: Eudicots
- Clade: Rosids
- Order: Malpighiales
- Family: Euphorbiaceae
- Genus: Croton
- Species: C. yecorensis

Binomial name
- Croton yecorensis V.W. Steinm. & Felger

Species of flowering plant

Croton yecorensis is a plant species endemic to a small region the State of Sonora, Mexico. The plant is known only from a mountainous region in the Sierra Madre Occidental in extreme eastern Sonora, only a few km from the line with Chihuahua. All the known populations lie within 60 km of one another in open rocky areas in pin-oak woodlands at elevations of 1200–1700 m.

Croton yecorensis is a perennial herb or subshrub, sparingly branched, up to 100 cm tall. Leaves are alternate, narrow and linear, up to 7 cm long but rarely more than 1.0 cm wide, covered with small stellate (highly branching) hairs. Flowers are borne in terminal racemes up to 5 cm long, with 1-5 pistillate (female) flowers near the base plus 12-42 staminate (male) flowers above. Flowers and seeds are creamy yellowish. Styles are bifid (branching in 2).
