= Croton incanus =

Scientific classification
- Kingdom: Plantae
- Clade: Embryophytes
- Clade: Tracheophytes
- Clade: Angiosperms
- Clade: Eudicots
- Clade: Rosids
- Order: Malpighiales
- Family: Euphorbiaceae
- Genus: Croton
- Species: C. incanus

Binomial name
- Croton incanus Kunth

Synonyms
- Croton suaveolens var. oblongifolius Torr.; Croton torreyanus Müll.Arg.; Oxydectes incana (Kunth) Kuntze; Oxydectes torreyana (Müll.Arg.) Kuntze

Species of plant

Croton incanus (syn. Croton torreyanus), Torrey's croton, is a species of flowering plant in the family Euphorbiaceae, native to Texas and Mexico. A shrub reaching 6 ft (1.8 m), it prefers partial shade.
