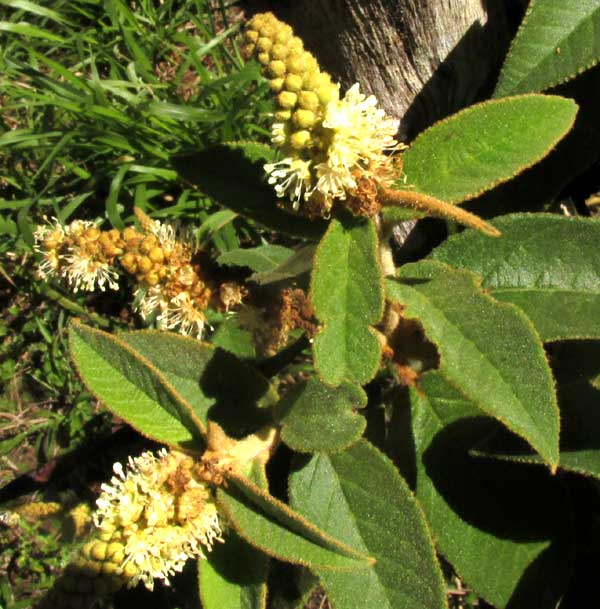
- Leafy stem with inflorescences of male flowers

Scientific classification
- Kingdom: Plantae
- Clade: Tracheophytes
- Clade: Angiosperms
- Clade: Eudicots
- Clade: Rosids
- Order: Malpighiales
- Family: Euphorbiaceae
- Genus: Croton
- Species: C. cortesianus

Binomial name
- Croton cortesianus Kunth

Synonyms
- Oxydectes cortesiana (Kunth) Kuntze; Croton chichenensis Lundell; Croton segoviarus Standl. & L.O. Williams; Croton trichocarpus Torr.

= Croton cortesianus =

Species of plant

Croton cortesianus, or Cortez's croton, is a species of shrub native to North America, including Central America. It belongs to the family Euphorbiaceae.

== Description ==
Here are some distinctive traits helping to distinguish Cortez's croton from similar species:

- Shrubs stand up to 2 m (6 ft 6 1/2 in) tall (shorter in the US), with stems branched 2 to 3 times and covered with branched or "stellate" hairs. When parts are cut, they exude clear, amber-hued sap.
- Leaves have petioles up to 1.5 cm (5/8 in) long. Blades are up to 10 cm (4 in) and 5 cm (2 in) wide, with margins bearing minute teeth but no deep indentations. Blade upper surfaces are dark green and hairless, while lower surfaces are paler, somewhat ochre colored when young, paler with age and remaining densely mantled with branched hairs.
- Plants either produce only male flowers, or only female ones; they are dioecious. Inflorescences are racemes containing up to 30 compactly grouped, unisexual flowers, whether male or female. Male flowers bear 5 petals about 3 mm (1/8 in) long, and up to 16 stamens. Female flowers develop only rudimentary petals, and each flower has a 3-chambered ovary topped with 3 styles up to 5 mm (3/16 in) long, each style for about half its length is divided into two parts, resulting in 6 terminal segments.
- Fruits are smooth capsules up to 6 mm (1/4 in) long and nearly as broad. Seeds are up to 5 mm (3/16 in) long and 3.5 mm (1/8 in) wide, shiny and with a silvery sheen.

== Distribution ==
In the USA, Cortez's croton occurs only in the state of Texas. In Mexico it occurs throughout, and in Central America it is found in Belize, Honduras and Nicaragua.

== Habitat ==
In the southernmost part of the US state of Texas, Cortez's croton occurs in scrub forests up to 50 m (160 ft) in elevation. In Nicaragua it is common in disturbed vegetation and tropical deciduous forests at elevations up to 1,550 m (5,090 ft) high. In Mexico's Yucatan Peninsula it occurs in dry forest with deciduous and semi-deciduous leaves.

== Conservation status ==
With its wide distribution, Cortez's croton is classified as of Least Concern on the IUCN Red List of Threatened Species (2018).

== In traditional medicine ==
Among eastern Mexico's Tének, or Huastec people, the sap from Cortez's croton is used to treat coughs and the rashes, itchiness and blisters of sarpullido, or dermatitis. Among central Mexico's Nahuas, Cortez's croton is considered a treatment for diarrhea and skin diseases. It is suggested that this usage is a continuation of practices of the ancient Aztecs.

In general, one should be careful about using sap from species of the genus Croton for medicinal reasons; some species definitely are toxic. The caustic sap can be useful if employed in proper doses and with appropriate application, as tradition teaches, but otherwise the sap may damage more than cure.

== Taxonomy ==
In 1817 when Carl Sigismund Kunth formally described and named Croton cortesianus, he was dealing with plants scientifically collected by Aimé Bonpland and Alexander von Humboldt on their exploratory American Expedition of 1799-1804. In his description, Kunth noted that his type specimen had grown on the shores of the Antilles near Campeche, Mexico. It can be assumed that this was near the city of Veracruz, from which Humboldt left Mexico at the end of his expedition, in 1804; he never was near the town of Campeche, though Veracruz can be considered at the eastern edge of the Bay of Campeche.

=== Etymology ===
The genus name Croton is from the Greek kroton meaning "tick", alluding to the resemblance of fruits of the genus's species to that blood-sucking arachnid.

Kunth named the species cortesianus because, in the field notes of the collector Bonpland, cortesianus was suggested as a name. In the title of Kunth's work it is made clear that such details associated with his descriptions are from the handwritten sheets of Aimé Bonpland: "... ex schedis autographis Amati Bonplandi." Bonpland can be assumed to have thought the name appropriate because he was collecting in the land (Mexico) where Hernán Cortés had caused the fall of the Aztec Empire.

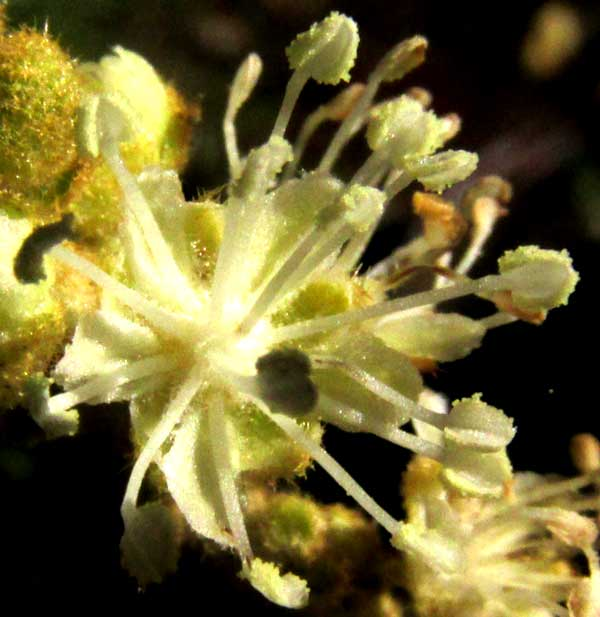
Male flower

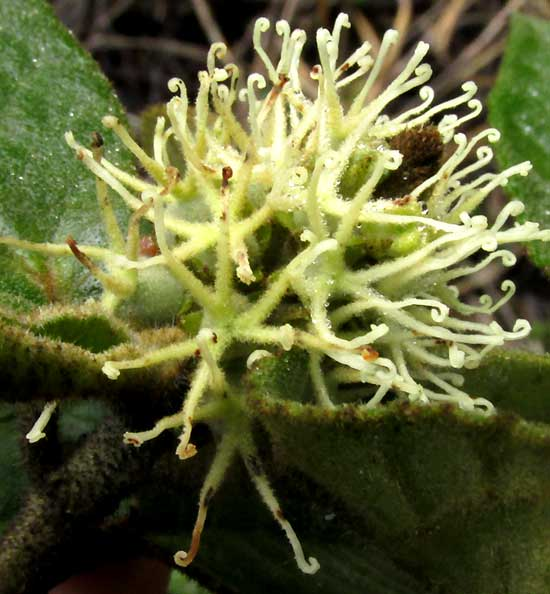
Female flowers

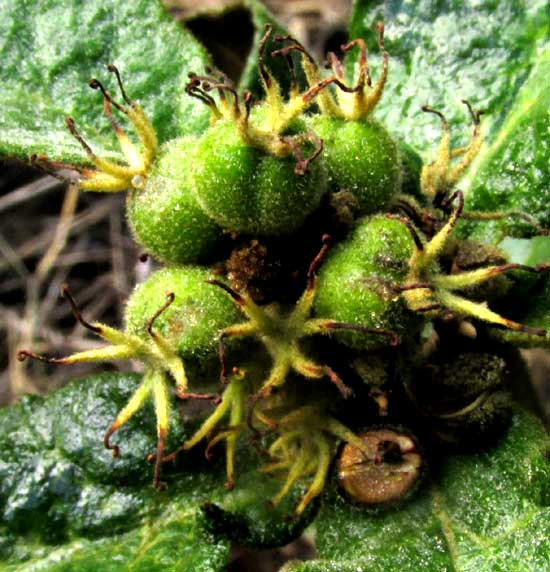
Immature fruits

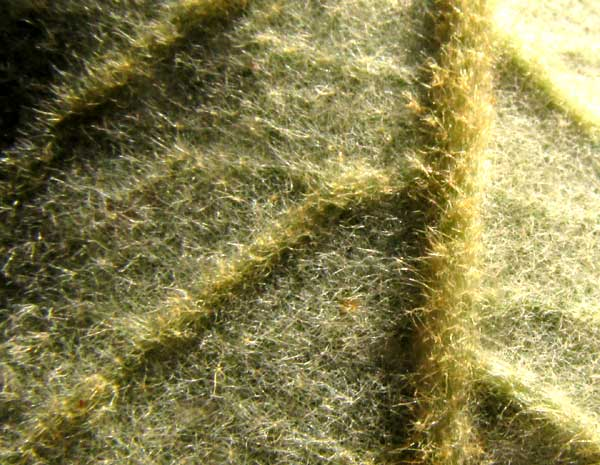
Hairy lower leaf surface

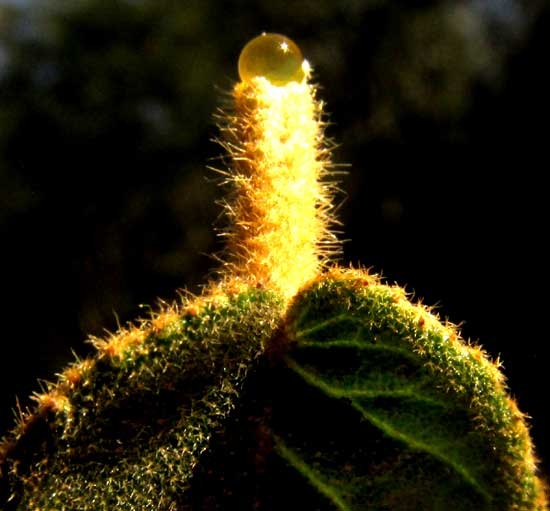
Sap oozing from broken petiole

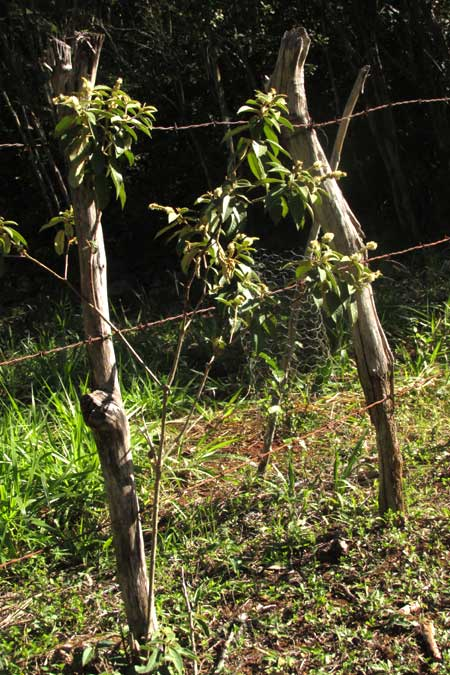
Plant in habitat
