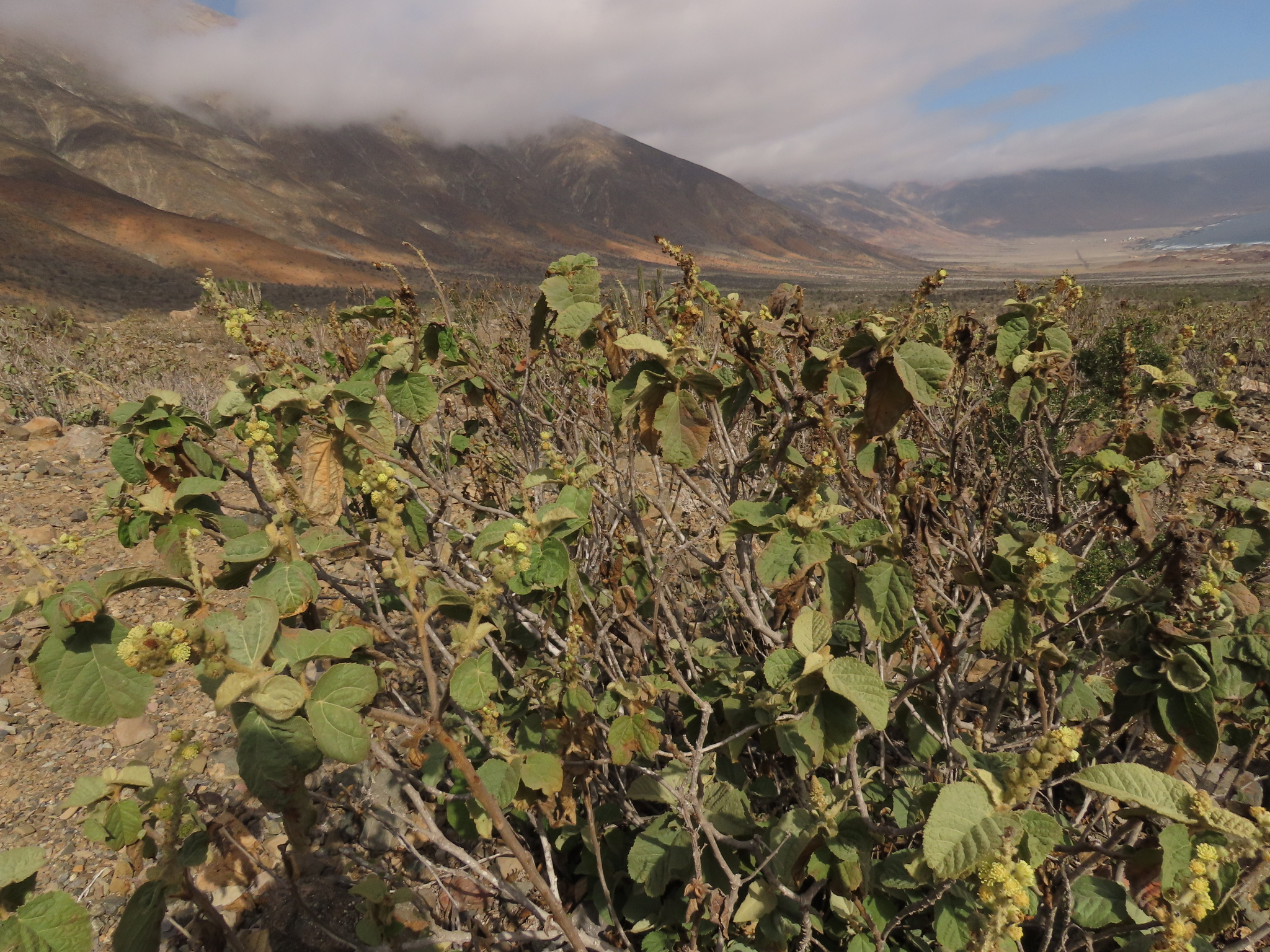

Scientific classification
- Kingdom: Plantae
- Clade: Tracheophytes
- Clade: Angiosperms
- Clade: Eudicots
- Clade: Rosids
- Order: Malpighiales
- Family: Euphorbiaceae
- Genus: Croton
- Species: C. chilensis

Binomial name
- Croton chilensis Müll. Arg.

= Croton chilensis =

Species of plant

Croton chilensis is a species of flowering plant in the family Euphorbiaceae. It is a shrub endemic to Northern Chile, distributed in the Antofagasta region.
