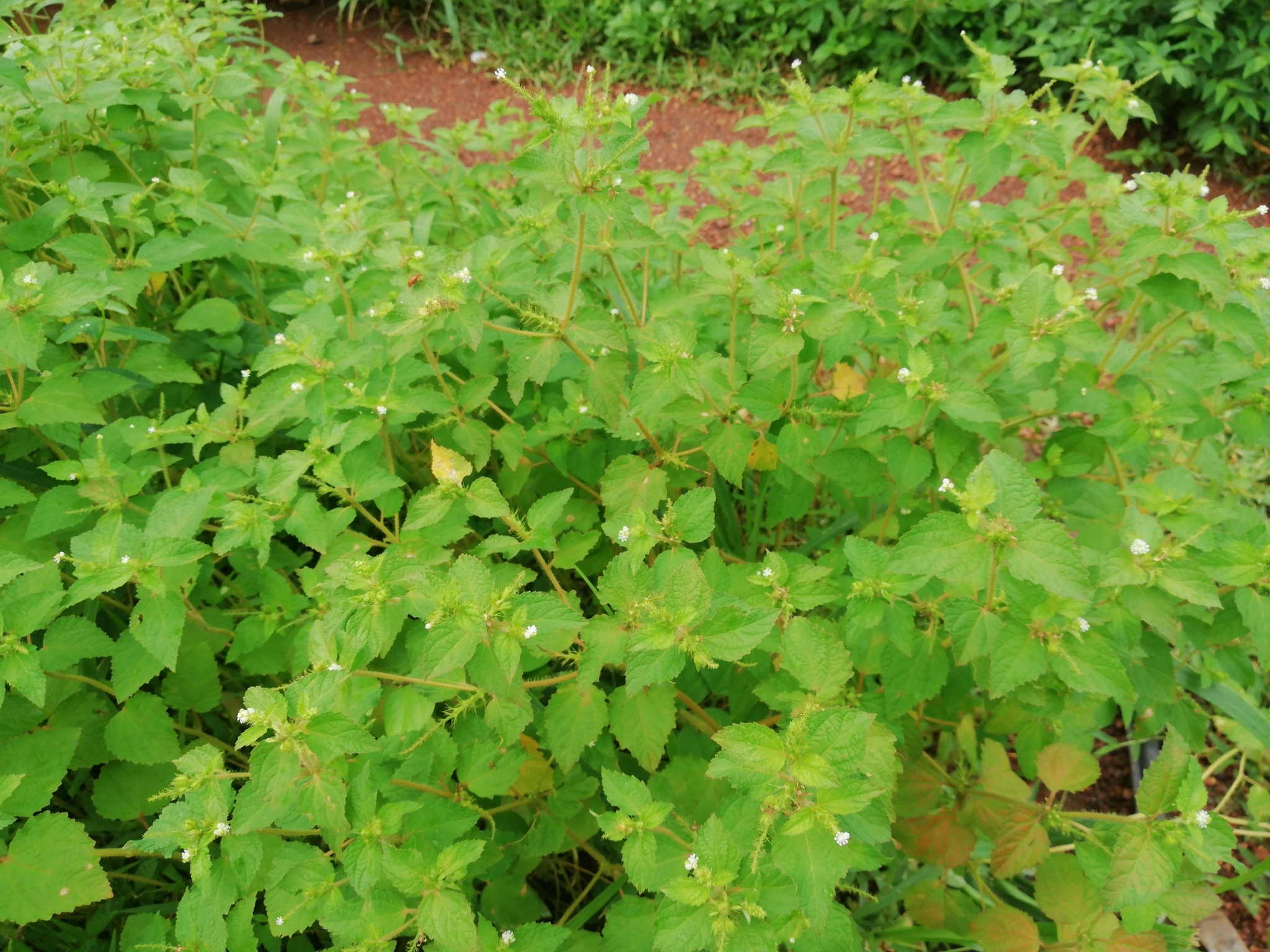

Scientific classification
- Kingdom: Plantae
- Clade: Tracheophytes
- Clade: Angiosperms
- Clade: Eudicots
- Clade: Rosids
- Order: Malpighiales
- Family: Euphorbiaceae
- Genus: Croton
- Species: C. hirtus

Binomial name
- Croton hirtus L'Hér (1785).

= Croton hirtus =

Species of shrub

Croton hirtus, the hairy croton, is a species of flowering plant in the family Euphorbiaceae. It is an annual herb native to regions from Mexico to tropical Argentina, occurring mainly in wet tropical biomes. The species has also been introduced to parts of Asia and Africa, and is known for its traditional medicinal uses.
