= Croton aromaticus =

Scientific classification
- Kingdom: Plantae
- Clade: Tracheophytes
- Clade: Angiosperms
- Clade: Eudicots
- Clade: Rosids
- Order: Malpighiales
- Family: Euphorbiaceae
- Genus: Croton
- Species: C. aromaticus

Binomial name
- Croton aromaticus L.

Synonyms
- Cascarilla aromatica (L.) Raf.; Croton tiliifolius var. aromaticus (L.) Lam.; Oxydectes aromatica (L.) Kuntze

Species of flowering plant

Croton aromaticus is a species of plant of the genus Croton and the family of Euphorbiaceae, native to in the Indian subcontinent. The plant is known as "Wel keppetiya - වෙල් කැප්පෙටියා" in Sri Lanka, where the roots, leaves and bark are widely used in Ayurveda for the treatments of bronchitis, diarrhoea, fever, malaria and dysentery.
