= Croton argyranthemus =

Scientific classification
- Kingdom: Plantae
- Clade: Tracheophytes
- Clade: Angiosperms
- Clade: Eudicots
- Clade: Rosids
- Order: Malpighiales
- Family: Euphorbiaceae
- Genus: Croton
- Species: C. argyranthemus

Binomial name
- Croton argyranthemus Michx.

Species of flowering plant

Croton argyranthemus, commonly known as the silver croton, sandhill croton, or healing croton, is a forb in the Euphorbiaceae family native to the southeastern United States.

== Description ==
Croton argyrantheus grows 10–60 cm tall. Several stems arise from the base and branch near the top into 2–4 parts. The stems are scaly. Leaves are borne singly with narrow stipules (about 0.2 mm long) and petioles that measure 0.2–2 cm and lack glands at the tip. Leaf blades on the lower parts of the stems are oval to narrowly obovate, while those on the upper parts are oblong to lance-shaped or broadly elliptic, ranging from 1–5 cm long and 0.5–3 cm wide. Leaf bases are rounded to narrowed, edges are smooth, and tips are blunt to rounded. The underside of the leaf is silvery and densely covered with scales, while the upper side is darker green with fewer scales or nearly smooth.

The flowers are arranged in bisexual racemes 2–5 cm long, containing 15–35 staminate flowers and 2–8 pistillate flowers. Pedicels are 1–5 mm long for staminate flowers and 0–2 mm for pistillate flowers. Staminate flowers have five sepals and five oblong-spatulate petals, each about 5 mm long, with a densely scaly underside. Petal scales are translucent, giving a glassy appearance. There are 10–15 stamens. Pistillate flowers have 5–7 sepals, fused for more than half their length, 3–4 mm long, with smooth edges and incurved tips. There are no petals. The ovary has three chambers, with three styles 2–4 mm long, each splitting 1–3 times at the tip into 6–24 segments. Capsules are 5–6 mm long and 3–4 mm wide, smooth, and contain a 3-angled columella. Seeds are 4–5 mm long, 2.5–3 mm wide, and have a dull surface.

== Distribution and habitat ==
Croton argyrantheus is found from central Georgia and southern Alabama south to central peninsular Florida and west to Louisiana and southwest to Oklahoma south through east and central Texas. It grows on sandy soils, and is primarily found in longleaf pine sandhill communities.

== Ecology ==
Croton argyrantheus is extremely vulnerable to disturbance, a reason for which might be that it relies on native species of ants for dispersal. The seeds have elaiosomes to attract ants to disperse the seed. The seeds are also dispersed via explosive dehiscence.

It flowers from March to October, and is fire tolerant.

== Cultural use ==
Many species in the Croton genus can be used medicinally, but the oil derived from the plant can cause blistering on the skin and is highly toxic to canines.
