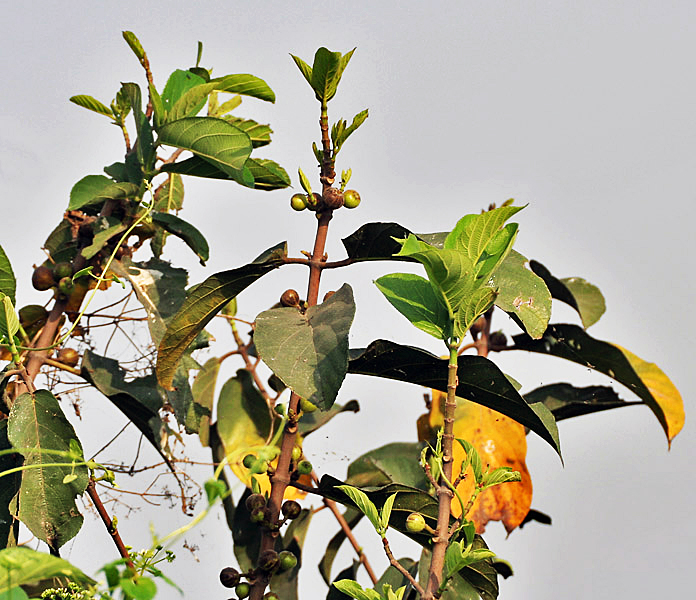

Scientific classification
- Kingdom: Plantae
- Clade: Tracheophytes
- Clade: Angiosperms
- Clade: Eudicots
- Clade: Rosids
- Order: Malpighiales
- Family: Euphorbiaceae
- Genus: Croton
- Species: C. laevigatus

Binomial name
- Croton laevigatus Vahl

= Croton laevigatus =

Species of flowering plant

Croton laevigatus is a species of flowering plant in the family Euphorbiaceae. It is native to Asia.

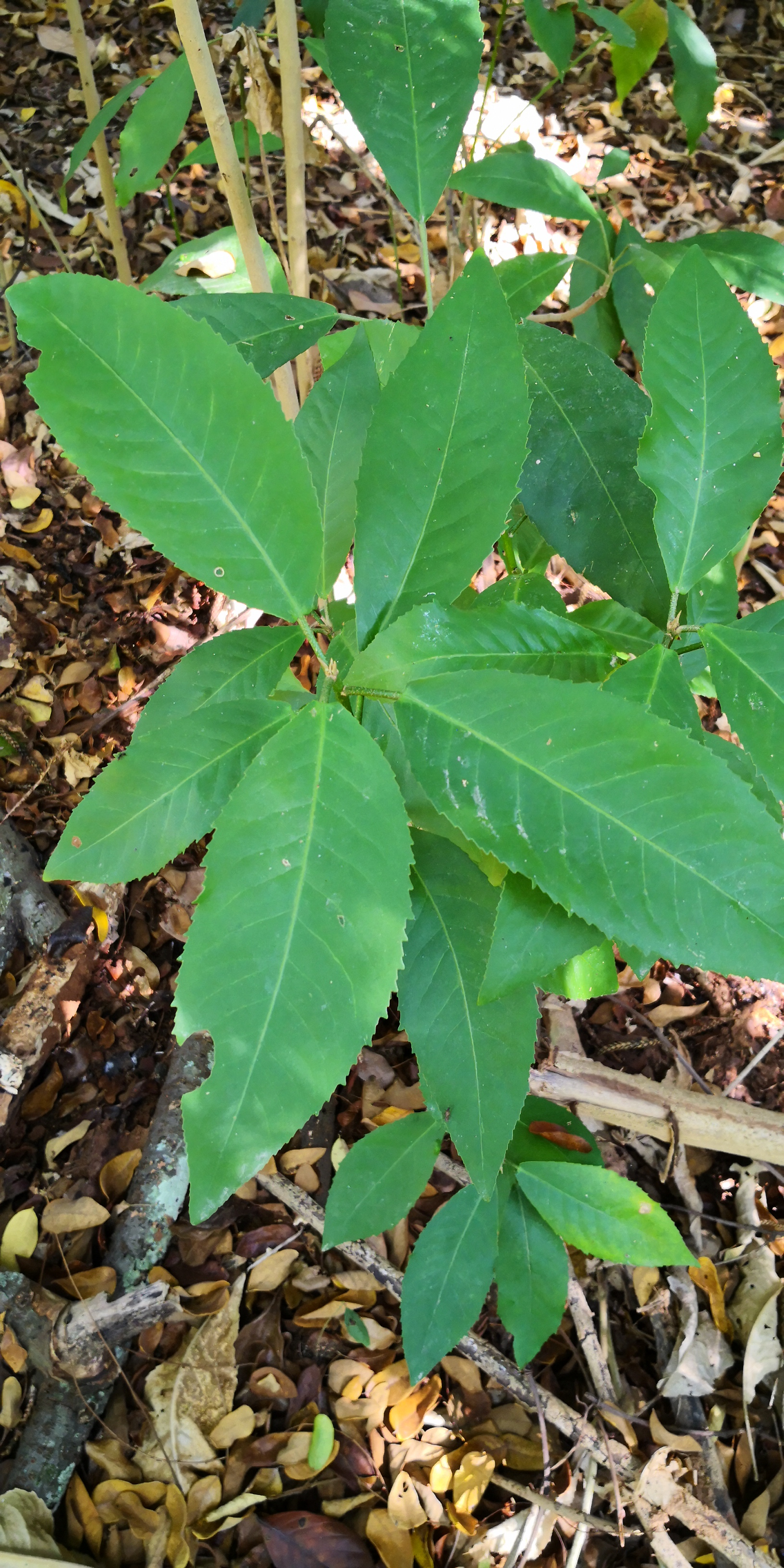
Leaves, Yunnan, SW China

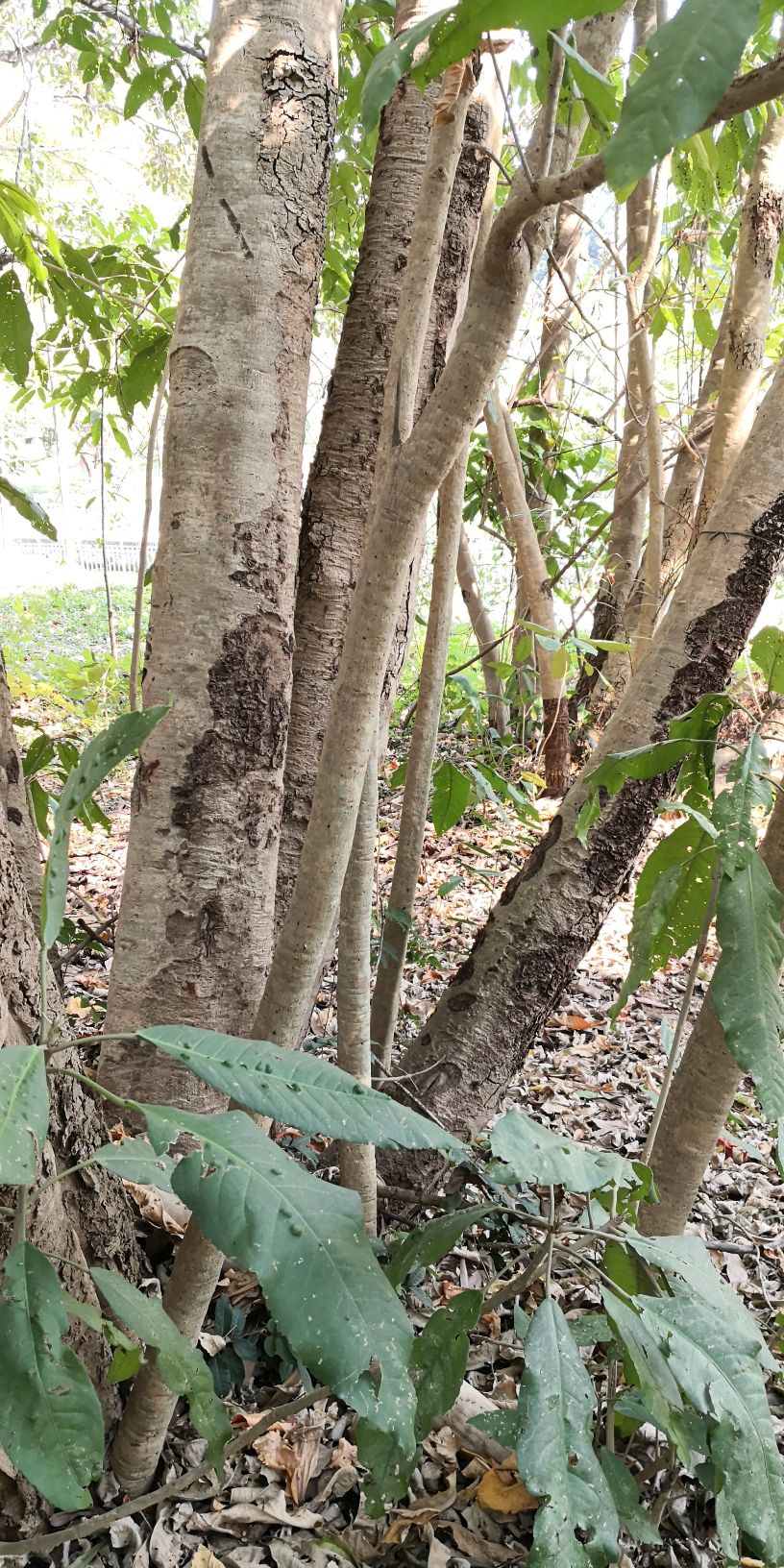
Stems, Yunnan, SW China
