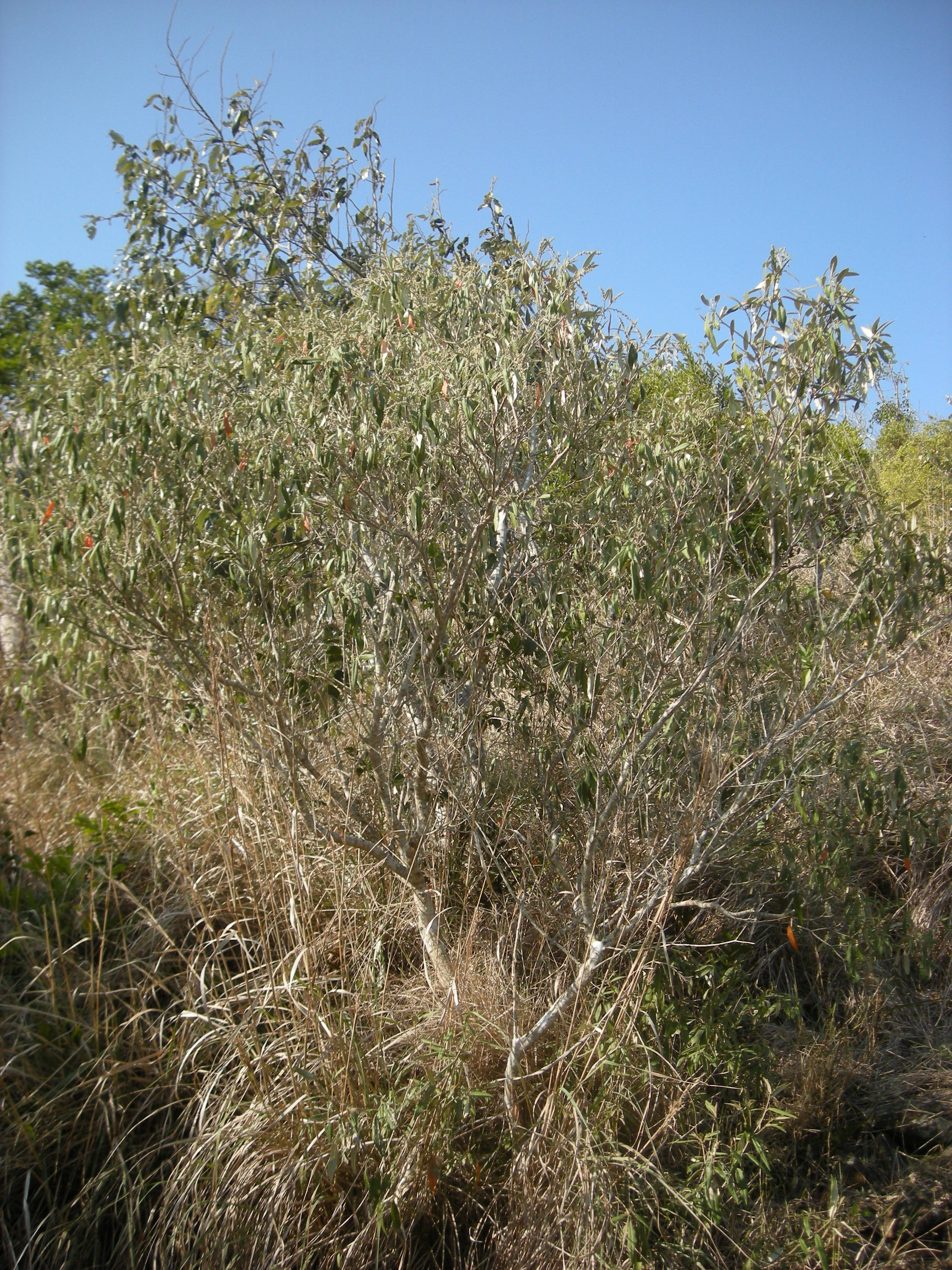

Scientific classification
- Kingdom: Plantae
- Clade: Tracheophytes
- Clade: Angiosperms
- Clade: Eudicots
- Clade: Rosids
- Order: Malpighiales
- Family: Euphorbiaceae
- Genus: Croton
- Species: C. phebalioides

Binomial name
- Croton phebalioides F.Muell. ex Müll.Arg.

= Croton phebalioides =

Species of flowering plant

Croton phebalioides, is a shrub endemic to northern Australia, from Central New South Wales to Cape York Peninsula.

The plant grows as a shrub, 3–4 metres in height, with narrow, strongly discolourous leaves approximately 5 cm in length. The upper leaf is a light to glaucous green, the lower leaf appears silver-white or brown due to a dense covering of scales. The natural habitat of Croton phebalioides is monsoon forest, rainforest and vine thickets, usually in hills of mountains.

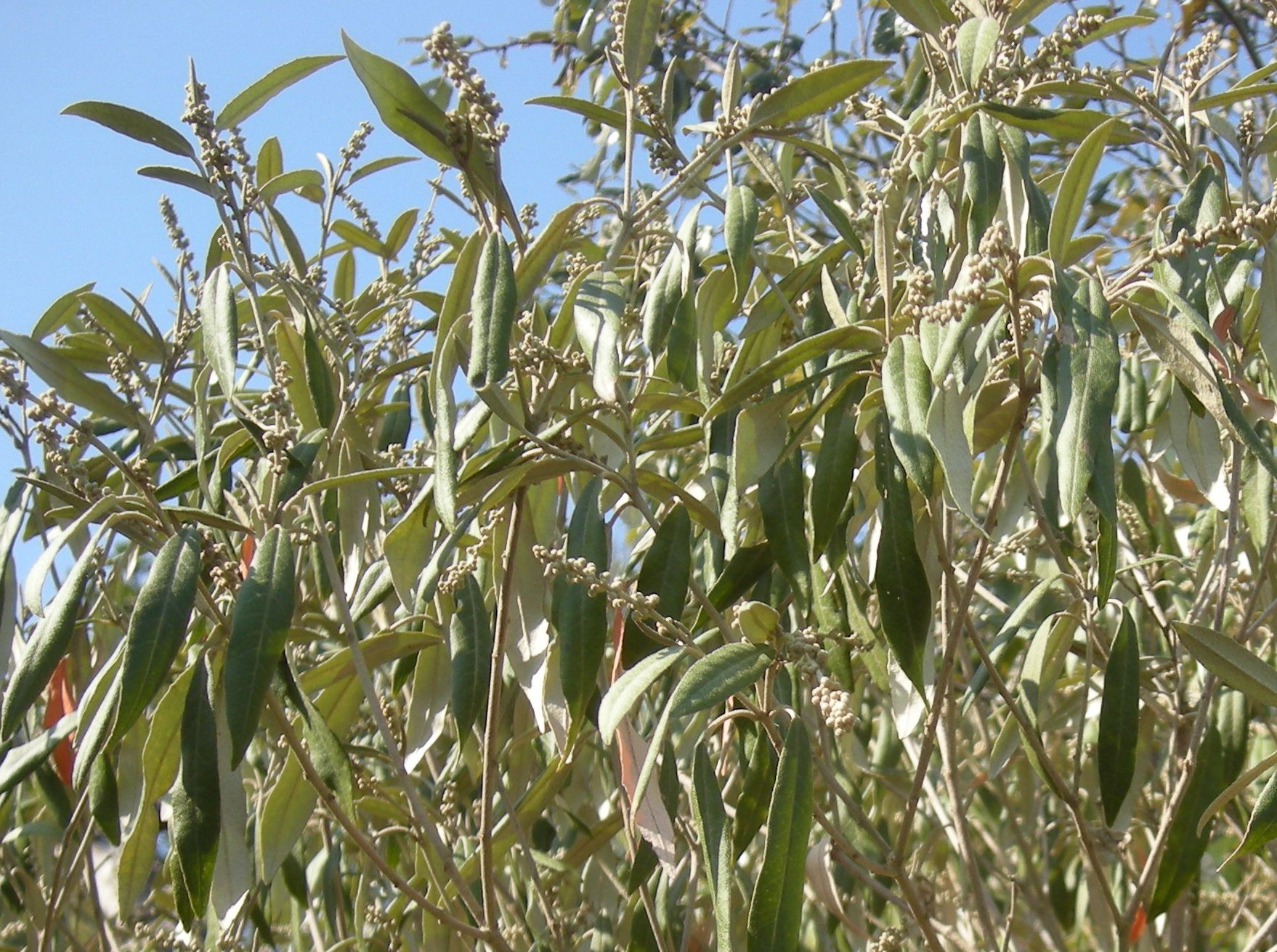
C. phebalioides flower buds
