= Croton salutaris =

Conservation status
- Least Concern (IUCN 3.1)

Scientific classification
- Kingdom: Plantae
- Clade: Tracheophytes
- Clade: Angiosperms
- Clade: Eudicots
- Clade: Rosids
- Order: Malpighiales
- Family: Euphorbiaceae
- Genus: Croton
- Species: C. salutaris

Binomial name
- Croton salutaris Casar.

Synonyms
- Croton angularis Klotzsch ex Baill.; Croton urceolatus Baill.; Oxydectes salutaris (Casar.) Kuntze

Species of plant

Croton salutaris is a species of flowering plant in the family Euphorbiaceae, native to southeastern Brazil. Its "dragon's blood" red sap promotes hemostasis and is used by local peoples to stem bleeding from wounds.
