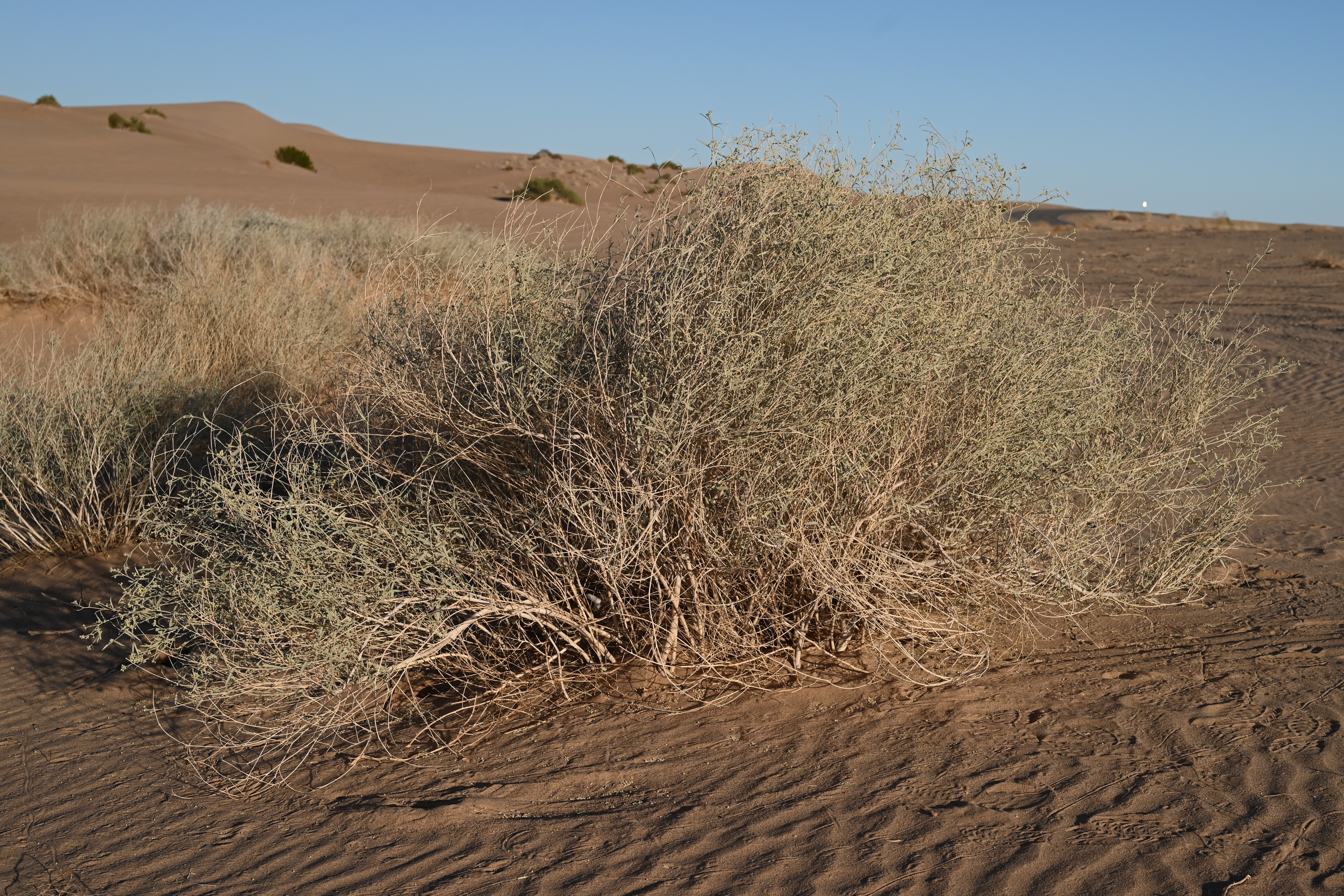
- In Californina

Conservation status
- Imperiled (NatureServe)

Scientific classification
- Kingdom: Plantae
- Clade: Embryophytes
- Clade: Tracheophytes
- Clade: Angiosperms
- Clade: Eudicots
- Clade: Rosids
- Order: Malpighiales
- Family: Euphorbiaceae
- Genus: Croton
- Species: C. wigginsii

Binomial name
- Croton wigginsii L.C.Wheeler

= Croton wigginsii =

Species of flowering plant

Croton wigginsii is a species of croton known by the common name Wiggins' croton.

== Distribution ==
This small gray-green shrub is native to the Sonoran Deserts of northern Mexico and Arizona, into the Colorado Desert in California, where it is an inhabitant of sand dunes.

== Description ==
Croton wigginsii is spreading shrub approaches a meter-3 feet in height. Its sparse foliage is made up of long oval-shaped leaves covered in a coating of white hairs. It is dioecious, with male plants bearing staminate flowers with thready stamens and female plants bearing pistillate flowers composed of the rounded immature fruits.
