= Croton myriaster =

Conservation status
- Near Threatened (IUCN 3.1)

Scientific classification
- Kingdom: Plantae
- Clade: Tracheophytes
- Clade: Angiosperms
- Clade: Eudicots
- Clade: Rosids
- Order: Malpighiales
- Family: Euphorbiaceae
- Genus: Croton
- Species: C. myriaster

Binomial name
- Croton myriaster Baker

Synonyms
- Croton calomeris Baill.; Croton myriaster var. austromadecassus Leandri; Croton regeneratrix var. ranomafanae Radcl.-Sm.

Species of flowering plant

Croton myriaster is a species of flowering small tree or shrub in the spurge family, Euphorbiaceae. It is endemic to Madagascar, where it occurs primarily in humid and subhumid montane forests.

Croton myriaster was first described by John Gilbert Baker in 1882 and has since been included in several taxonomic treatments of Euphorbiaceae and Malagasy flora, with three later names now treated as synonyms.

It is known for having medicinal uses and is listed in the World Checklist of Useful Plant Species 2020. It has been assessed as Near Threatened on the IUCN Red List due to ongoing habitat loss of Madagascar's humid forests.

== Description ==
Croton myriaster grows to around 10 metres (33 ft) tall, with stems up to 20 centimetres (7.9 in) in diameter. Young twigs are covered in short, stellate (star-shaped), hair-like appendages (trichomes), which are widespread within the genus. These trichomes are known to help protect against abiotic stresses, herbivores, and pathogens.

The leaves are simple and arranged alternately along the stems. Leaf blades are ovate to lanceolate, typically 8–15 cm long, with a rounded base, a pointed tip, and entire or finely toothed margins. The leaf stalk (petiole), measures about 1.5–2.5 cm in length. The lower leaf surface is paler and whitish, often with fine hairs. At the base of the leaf blade are two small brown extrafloral nectary glands, which are a characteristic feature of some members of the Euphorbiaceae family.

Croton myriaster is monoecious, with separate male and female flowers on the same plant. The flowers are arranged in a short, upright cluster called a raceme, at the end of a densely hairy axis. Within each inflorescence, multiple male flowers occur towards the tip, with just two or three female flowers near the base. Flowers are unisexual, small, and white to pale green or yellow, with five floral parts, and the petals are greatly reduced. Male flowers have a bell-shaped calyx, five small petals, and 12–16 free stamens. Female flowers have softly hairy, brownish sepals and no petals, a three-lobed ovary, and three branched styles. The flower stalk elongates as the fruit develops.

After flowering, the plant produces a hard, three-lobed capsule, typical of the spurge family. The capsule is reddish-brown, about 12 mm long, and covered with fine glandular hairs. Each fruit contains three seeds, which are oval, approximately 7 mm long and grooved.

=== Etymology ===
Croton derives from the Greek κρότων (krótos), meaning "tick", referring to the tick-like appearance of the seeds in some species. The species name, myriaster is formed from Greek roots: myri- (from μύριοι, meaning "countless" or "many") and -aster (from ἀστήρ, meaning "star"). The name may refer to the star-like stellate trichomes characteristic of the species.

The gender of the Greek Croton (κρότων) is masculine, although it has been historically treated as neuter or feminine. This has required correction within the genus of epithets with non-masculine endings. The epithet myriaster is already masculine and was therefore not subject to any correction.

== Habitat and ecology ==
Croton myriaster occurs in humid and subhumid montane forest in Madagascar at elevations of approximately 800–1,700 m (2,600–5,600 ft). The humid and subhumid bioclimatic zones cover the eastern and central plateaus of Madagascar. These forests are characterised by high annual rainfall (about 1,500–2,400 mm (59–94 in)), a short or absent dry season, and predominantly evergreen vegetation. At higher altitudes, frequent cloud condensation compensates for reduced rainfall. They typically have a closed, multi-layered canopy and a dense understorey, with canopy height declining with increasing elevation. Tree diversity is high, and members of Euphorbiaceae, including Croton, are among several understory and mid-layer trees and shrubs that are dominant within these ecosystems. Other common families include Annonaceae, Apocynaceae, Melastomataceae, Rubiaceae, and Sapindaceae.

=== Extrafloral nectary glands ===
Croton myriaster has nectary glands at the base of the leaves, a feature that is common in the Croton genus. These nectar-secreting structures found outside the flowers are not involved directly in pollination. In studies of other Croton species, they have been found to be associated with mutualistic interactions, such as contributing to defense against herbivores.

=== Distribution ===
Croton myriaster is endemic to Madagascar and is one of the few Malagasy Croton species that is widespread across the island, having been recorded in all six former provinces: Antananarivo, Antsiranana, Fianarantsoa, Mahajanga, Toamasina, and Toliara. The species is known from 208 preserved specimens, with occurrences spanning from the North to the South of the country and with concentration in the humid to subhumid eastern and central regions. There are 15 subpopulations across 11 locations, and the total area within which the species is known to occur is approximately 41,800 km^{2} (16,100 sq mi).

== Taxonomy and systematics ==
Croton myriaster is a member of the spurge family, Euphorbiaceae. The Croton genus comprises more than 1,200 species worldwide, with ~114 of the roughly 450 described Old World species occurring in Madagascar.

Croton is divided into four monophyletic subgenera: subg. Quadrilobi, subg. Adenophylli, subg. Geiseleria, and subg. Croton L. Three of these are restricted to the Neotropics, while the fourth, subgenus Croton, comprises all paleotropical species. All Malagasy species, including C. myriaster, belong to this Old World clade, which is inferred to have originated from the New World, followed by diversification in Africa and the western Indian Ocean region (WIOR).

Early classifications of Croton within Madagascar grouped some Malagasy species with New World species. Subsequent molecular analyses have shown that several of these groupings didn't reflect true evolutionary relationships, which has led to revisions of the genus. Phylogenetic analyses place Croton myriaster within the Adenophorus group. Within this revised grouping, C. myriaster is most closely related to C. regeneratrix.

=== Morphological classification ===
Trichome morphology, distribution and density are widely used for taxonomic purposes in the Croton genus, although inconsistent terminology in earlier work limited their use. A recent revision by Pinto-Silva et al. of trichome classification within the genus aimed to improve clarity in how these characters are described and used in species identification. The Adenophorus group are characterised by stellate (star-like) trichomes, which, together with other diagnostic features such as nectary glands and tightly clustered flower inflorescences, help to distinguish this lineage morphologically.

=== Synonyms ===
The currently accepted name is Croton myriaster Baker, first published in the Journal of Botany v. 20, 1882. Several names previously applied to Malagasy specimens are now treated as heterotypic synonyms, including:

- Croton calomeris Baill. in Bull. Mens. Soc. Linn. Paris 2: 860 (1890)
- Croton myriaster var. austromadecassus Leandri in Ann. Mus. Colon. Marseille, sér. 5, 7(1): 58 (1939)
- Croton regeneratrix var. ranomafanae Radcl.-Sm. in Gen. Croton Madag. Comoro: 202 (2016)

Croton regeneratrix var. ranomafanae Radcl.-Sm. (2016) is one of numerous Croton taxa described by Radcliffe-Smith (2016) that were later placed into synonymy following reassessment.

== Uses ==
Croton myriaster has recorded traditional medicinal uses. A decoction prepared from the aerial parts is administered to children for epileptic attacks, and inhalations are used in the treatment of headaches. Croton myriaster is considered morphologically close to several other Malagasy medicinal species within the genus, with almost 40 Croton species from Madagascar being used in medicine. The wood is also known to be used as firewood.

== Phytochemistry ==
The bark contains trace amounts of alkaloids, although none have been detected in the leaves.

== Threats and conservation ==
Croton myriaster was assessed for the IUCN Red List of Threatened Species in 2020 and classified as Near Threatened under criterion B2ab(iii). No species-specific threats are identified, however, its primary habitat is subject to continuing decline in area and quality, with 33.4% of Madagascar's humid forest's having been removed since the 1970s. C. myriaster is known to occur in some protected areas, including Ranomafana National Park and Andringitra National Park. Much of the protected area coverage within Madagascar's humid forest region lies above 500 m elevation, which broadly overlaps with the known elevational range of C. myriaster.
