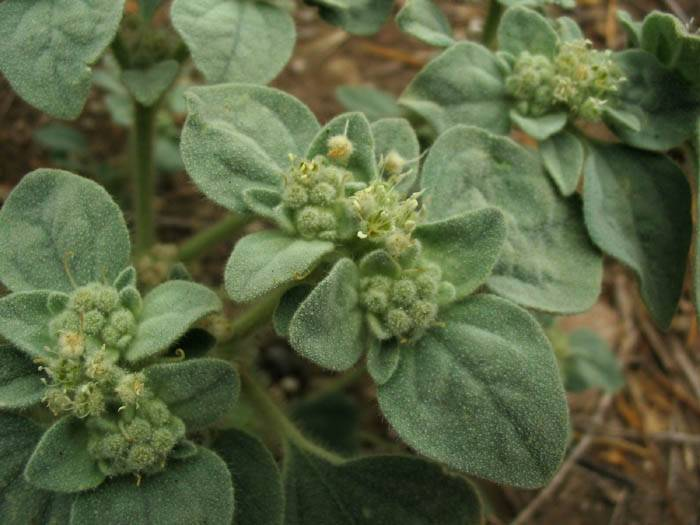

Conservation status
- Secure (NatureServe)

Scientific classification
- Kingdom: Plantae
- Clade: Tracheophytes
- Clade: Angiosperms
- Clade: Eudicots
- Clade: Rosids
- Order: Malpighiales
- Family: Euphorbiaceae
- Genus: Croton
- Species: C. setiger

Binomial name
- Croton setiger Hook.

Synonyms
- Eremocarpus setiger (Hook.) Benth.; Piscaria setigera (Hook.) Piper

= Croton setiger =

Species of flowering plant

Croton setiger is a species of plant known in English as turkey mullein, dove weed, and fish locoweed. (Not to be confused with Murdannia nudiflora, which is often called doveweed.) It is native to most of the western United States and northwest Mexico. It has naturalized elsewhere, including parts of Australia and Central Chile. It is sometimes spelled Croton setigerus and was formerly known as Eremocarpus setigerus.

This is a squat plant with furry, feltlike, hexagon shaped leaves, pale pink green in color. The small green flowers are covered in soft bristles.

== Cultivation and Uses ==
Croton setigerus is used as an ornamental plant; its low and rounded form fills a pot.

The foliage is toxic to animals, and the crushed plants, called shä'um by the Pomo people and kē-chil' wä-ē-mök' by the Yuki people, were used by both Native Americans and later immigrants as a fish toxin to stupefy fish and make them easy to catch. When crushed, the leaves have a sweet odor that some find unpleasant.

Chesnut reported that the Konkow (Maidu) people of northeastern Central California use the plant extensively for medicinal purposes in addition to its use as a fish toxin. He also noted that the seeds are such a potent attractant for doves that Native Americans would take advantage of concentrations of "dove weed" to lure and catch doves in large numbers.

The use as a fish toxin was known to early Spanish settlers of the American Southwest, who sometimes called it yerba del pescado ("fishing herb"), one of a number of plants called by that name.

Despite the plant's toxicity to some species, the seeds are eaten by birds. Several of the common names of the plant come from the affinity of doves and wild turkeys for the seeds.
