= Croton grandilevus =

Scientific classification
- Kingdom: Plantae
- Clade: Tracheophytes
- Clade: Angiosperms
- Clade: Eudicots
- Clade: Rosids
- Order: Malpighiales
- Family: Euphorbiaceae
- Genus: Croton
- Species: C. grandilevus

Binomial name
- Croton grandilevus Baill.

Synonyms
- List: Croton agrarius var. augustinianus Baill.; Croton agrarius var. cremostachyus Baill.; Croton agrarius var. neuwiedii Baill.; Croton augustinianus Baill.; Croton cremostachyus Baill.; Croton curuguatyensis Ahumada; Croton echinocarpus Baill.; Croton grandivelum var. augustinianus (Baill.) Müll.Arg.; Croton grandivelum var. cremostachyus (Baill.) Müll.Arg.; Croton grandivelum var. genuinus Müll.Arg.; Croton grandivelum var. neuwiedii (Baill.) Müll.Arg.; Croton grandivelum var. pannosus Müll.Arg.; Croton occidentalis Müll.Arg.; Croton occidentalis var. intermedius Chodat & Hassl.; Croton occidentalis var. oblongifolius Chodat & Hassl.; Croton occidentalis var. ovalifolius Chodat & Hassl.; Croton occidentalis var. parvifolius Chodat & Hassl.; Croton occidentalis f. rupestris Chodat & Hassl.; Croton occidentalis var. setosus Chodat & Hassl.; Croton pohlianus var. macrophyllus Chodat & Hassl.; Croton pomaderris Baill.; Croton pycnocarpus Müll.Arg.; Oxydectes occidentalis (Müll.Arg.) Kuntze; Oxydectes pomaderris (Baill.) Kuntze

Species of flowering plant

Croton grandilevus is a species of croton endemic to central and southern Brazil and to Paraguay.

== Medicine ==
Research into the species has demonstrated antiviral potential from the alkaloids found in its leaves. In particular, the corydine and norisoboldine compounds contain anti-HIV activity, inhibiting specific enzyme activity.
