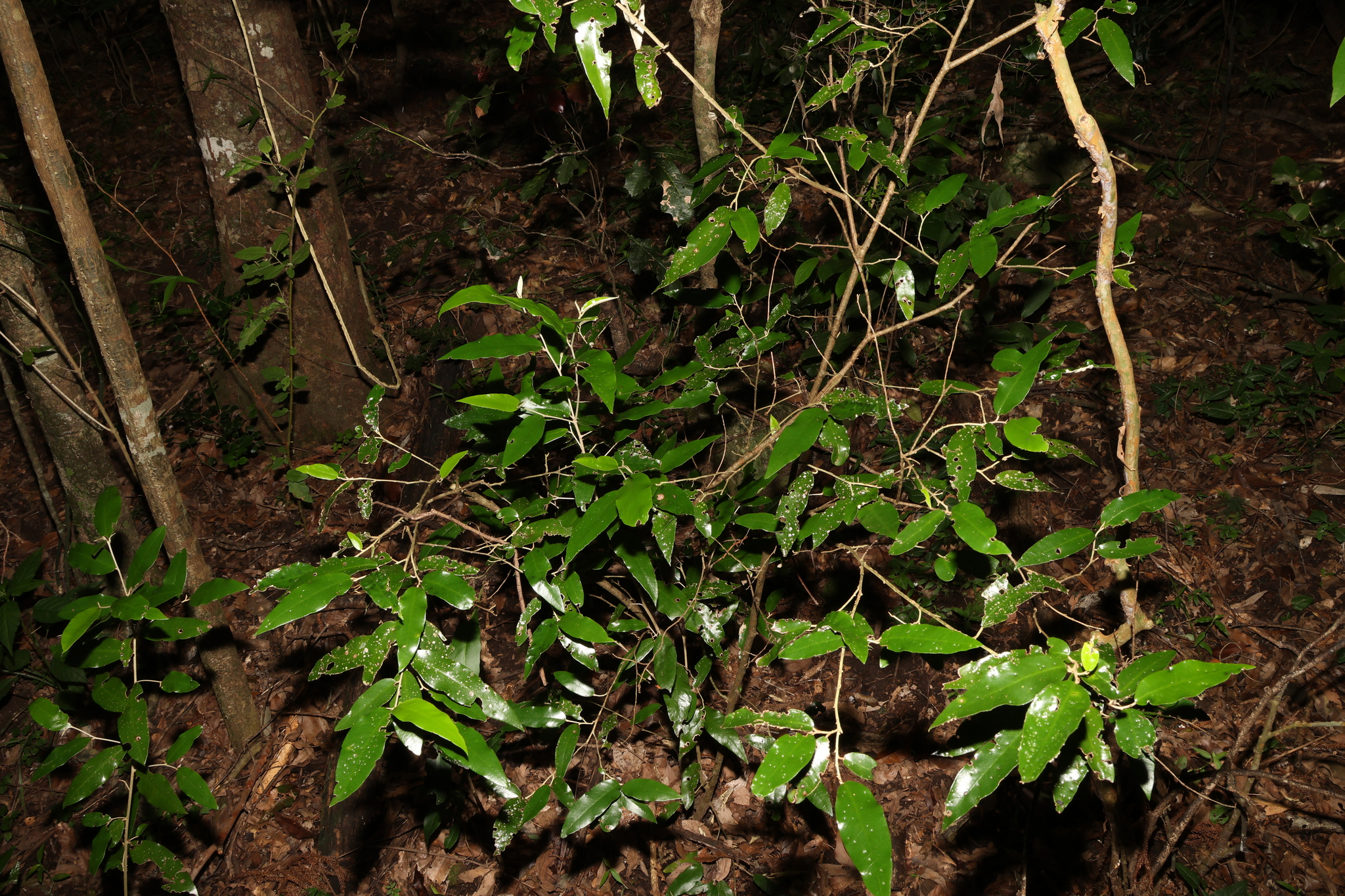

Conservation status
- Critically endangered (EPBC Act)

Scientific classification
- Kingdom: Plantae
- Clade: Tracheophytes
- Clade: Angiosperms
- Clade: Eudicots
- Clade: Rosids
- Order: Malpighiales
- Family: Euphorbiaceae
- Genus: Croton
- Species: C. mamillatus

Binomial name
- Croton mamillatus P.I.Forst.

= Croton mamillatus =

Species of plant

Croton mamillatus is a species of shrub in the family Euphorbiaceae, which is endemic to Queensland, Australia.

== Description ==
It is a perennial shrub with simple leaf compoundness, capable of growing up to 4 metres in height. It flowers from September to January and fruits from September to June.

== Habitat and distribution ==
It is a dry rainforest plant growing in microphyll and notophyll vineforest. It grows on red soils derived from chert.

It is native to Southeast Queensland, with 3 major disjunct populations, one in Logan City southwest of Beenleigh, a second near Boonah and a third in the locality of Campbells Pocket.

== Conservation ==
Croton mamillatus is classified as "critically endangered" under the Australian Government Environment Protection and Biodiversity Conservation Act 1999 and as "critically endangered" under the Queensland Government Nature Conservation Act 1992.
