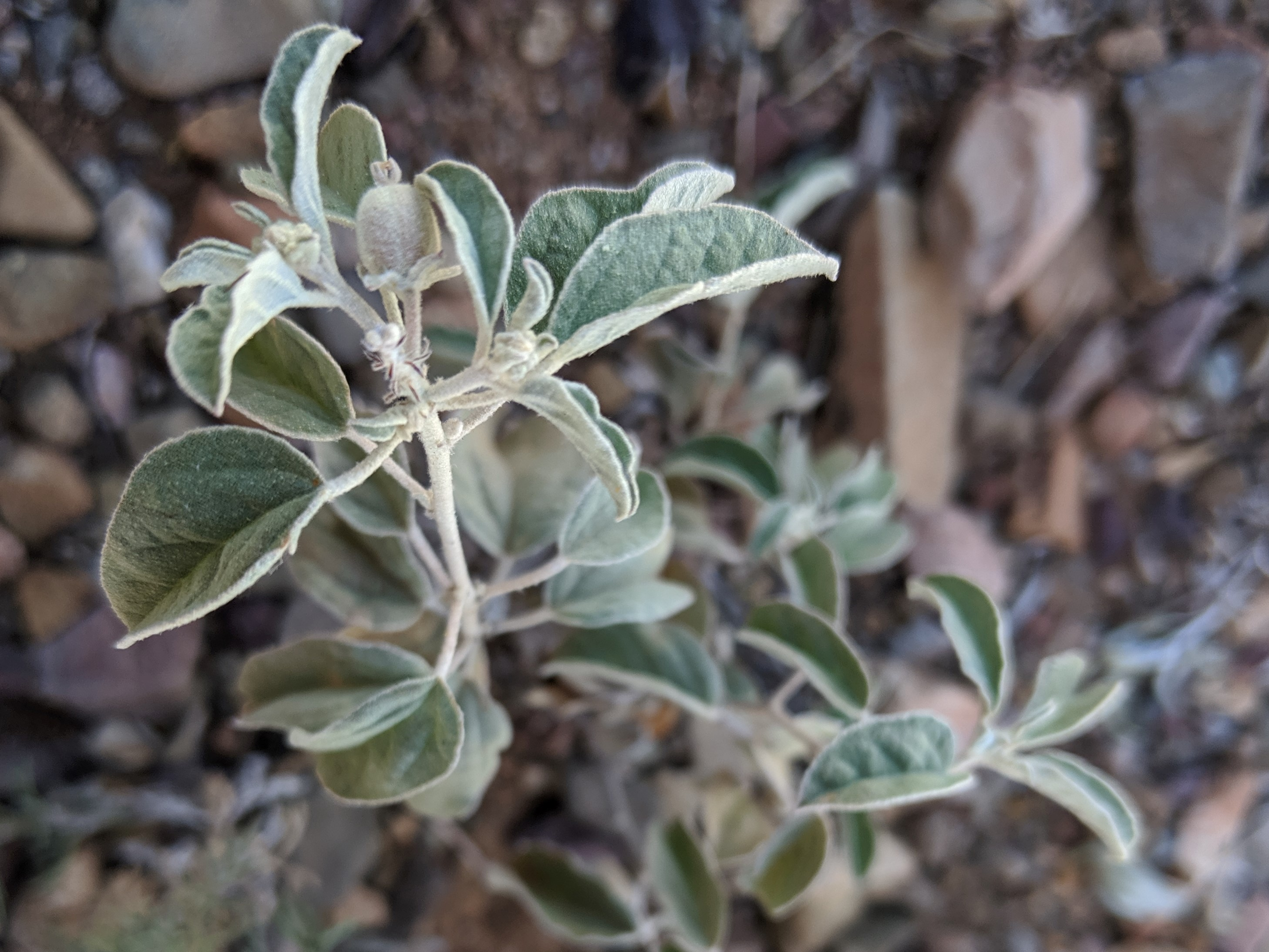

Conservation status
- Secure (NatureServe)

Scientific classification
- Kingdom: Plantae
- Clade: Tracheophytes
- Clade: Angiosperms
- Clade: Eudicots
- Clade: Rosids
- Order: Malpighiales
- Family: Euphorbiaceae
- Genus: Croton
- Species: C. pottsii

Binomial name
- Croton pottsii (Klotzsch) Müll.Arg.

Synonyms
- Croton corymbulosoides; Croton corymbulosus; Croton eremophilus; Lasiogyne pottsii; Oxydectes pottsii

= Croton pottsii =

Species of flowering plant

Croton pottsii is a species of plant known by the common name leatherweed. It is native to the southwestern United States and northern Mexico.

== Description ==
Croton pottsii is a perennial forb with ovate to elliptic shaped leaves, which are dusty green in color due to the presence of stellate hairs. The flowers can be unisexual or bisexual and lack petals.

The species is named for John Potts, manager of the Chihuahua Mint.
