= Croton triacros =

Conservation status
- Least Concern (NCA)

Scientific classification
- Kingdom: Plantae
- Clade: Embryophytes
- Clade: Tracheophytes
- Clade: Spermatophytes
- Clade: Angiosperms
- Clade: Eudicots
- Clade: Rosids
- Order: Malpighiales
- Family: Euphorbiaceae
- Genus: Croton
- Species: C. triacros

Binomial name
- Croton triacros F.Muell.

Species of flowering plant

Croton triacros is a species of plants of the genus Croton and the family of Euphorbiaceae, found in north-east Queensland, Australia.
