= Croton ferrugineus =

Scientific classification
- Kingdom: Plantae
- Clade: Tracheophytes
- Clade: Angiosperms
- Clade: Eudicots
- Clade: Rosids
- Order: Malpighiales
- Family: Euphorbiaceae
- Genus: Croton
- Species: C. ferrugineus

Binomial name
- Croton ferrugineus Kunth

Synonyms
- Croton collinus Kunth; Croton elegans Kunth, nom. illeg.; Croton ferrugineus var. collinus (Kunth) Müll.Arg.; Croton ferrugineus var. elegans (Kunth) Müll.Arg.; Croton ferrugineus var. genuinus Müll.Arg., not validly publ.; Croton ferrugineus var. peltoideus (Kunth) Müll.Arg.; Croton peltoideus Kunth; Oxydectes ferruginea (Kunth) Kuntze

Species of flowering plant

Croton ferrugineus, synonym Croton elegans, is a flowering plant species in the family Euphorbiaceae native from western South America to northern Brazil.

== Conservation ==
Croton elegans was assessed as "vulnerable" in the 2004 IUCN Red List, where it is said to be native only to Ecuador. As of June 2023, C. elegans was regarded as a synonym of Croton ferrugineus, which has a wider distribution.
