= Croton chittagongensis =

Conservation status
- Critically Endangered (IUCN 3.1)

Scientific classification
- Kingdom: Plantae
- Clade: Tracheophytes
- Clade: Angiosperms
- Clade: Eudicots
- Clade: Rosids
- Order: Malpighiales
- Family: Euphorbiaceae
- Genus: Croton
- Species: C. chittagongensis

Binomial name
- Croton chittagongensis Chakrab. & N.P.Balakr.

Species of plant

Croton chittagongensis is a species of shrub in the spurge family, native to Bangladesh. It was described by Nambiyath Puthansurayil Balakrishnan and Tapas Chakrabarty in 1983.

== Description ==
Croton chittagongensis is a small tree that grows primarily in the wet tropical biome. The bark smells like pepper or ginger. Its young shoots are a soft grayish-brown, and the branchlets are smooth. The leaves are shaped as elongated ovals, with the largest being about 9 cm long and 2.7 cm wide. They have a smooth surface and are structured with faint nerves.

The tree produces terminal flower clusters that are yellowish and appear early. The male flowers grow in small groups, with petals that are about 2–3 mm long and have a delicate, punctured look. They also have several stamens. Female flowers are usually solitary, with similar characteristics to the male but with different shapes and sizes for the petals and ovary. The tree blooms in May.

== Conservation ==
Croton chittagongensis was last traced in 1939. According to the IUCN Red List of Threatened Species, the plant is possibly extinct.
