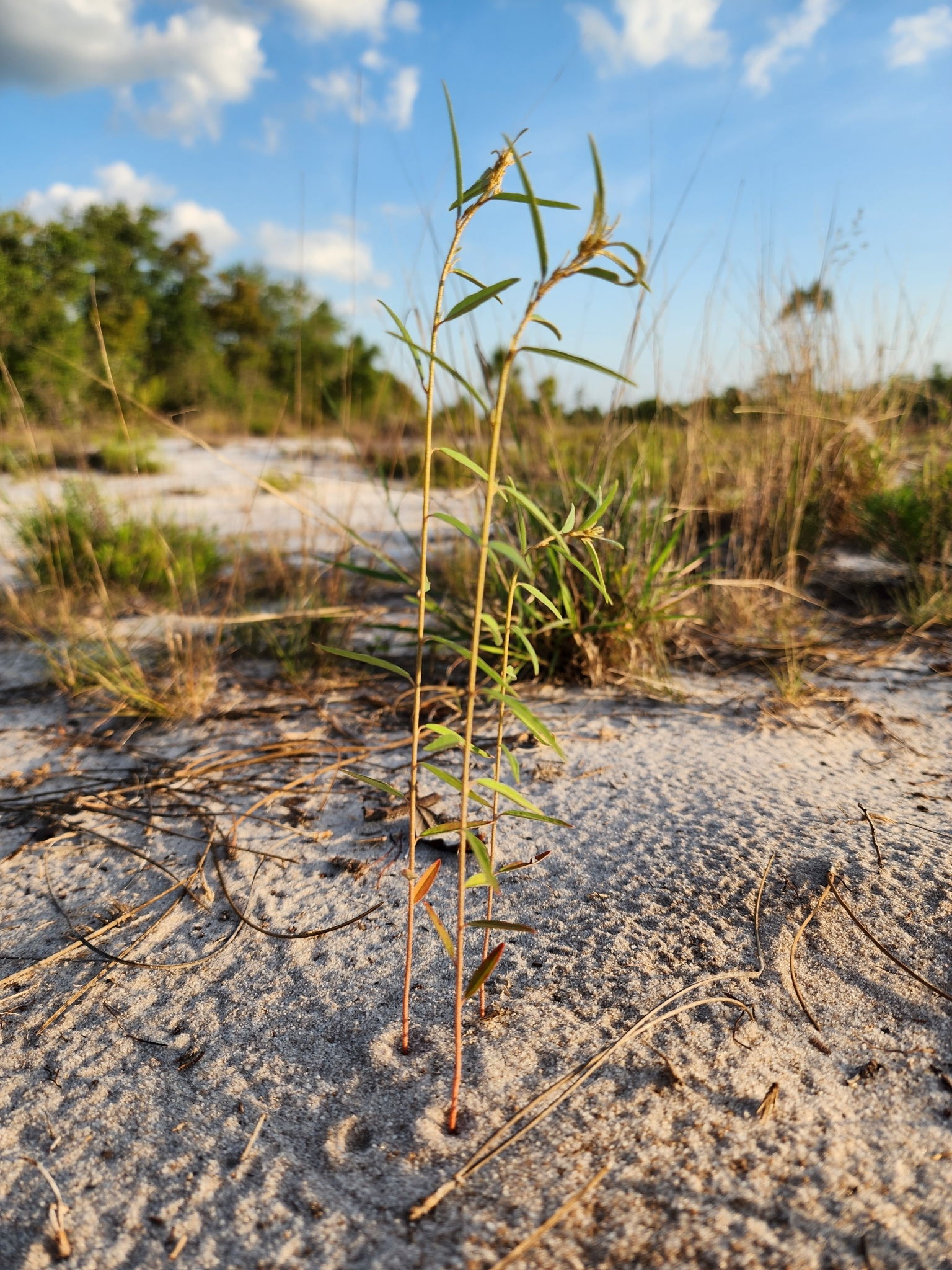

Conservation status
- Secure (NatureServe)

Scientific classification
- Kingdom: Plantae
- Clade: Tracheophytes
- Clade: Angiosperms
- Clade: Eudicots
- Clade: Rosids
- Order: Malpighiales
- Family: Euphorbiaceae
- Genus: Croton
- Species: C. michauxii

Binomial name
- Croton michauxii G.L.Webster

Synonyms
- Crotonopsis elliptica, Croton willdenowii

= Croton michauxii =

Species of flowering plant

Croton michauxii, commonly known as elliptical rushfoil, and Michaux's croton, is a plant species in the family Euphorbiaceae that is native to the United States. It is an annual plant.

== Conservation status in the United States ==
It is listed as a special concern and believed extirpated in Connecticut. It is endangered in Indiana and extirpated in Pennsylvania.
