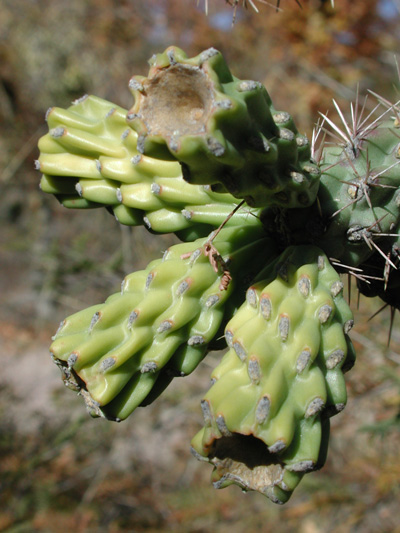
- Immature fruits on a plant in Gila County, Arizona

Conservation status
- Least Concern (IUCN 3.1)

Scientific classification
- Kingdom: Plantae
- Clade: Tracheophytes
- Clade: Angiosperms
- Clade: Eudicots
- Order: Caryophyllales
- Family: Cactaceae
- Genus: Cylindropuntia
- Species: C. spinosior

Binomial name
- Cylindropuntia spinosior (Engelm.) F.M.Knuth

Synonyms
- Opuntia spinosior (Engelm.) Toumey; Opuntia whipplei var. spinosior Engelm.

= Cylindropuntia spinosior =

Species of cactus

Cylindropuntia spinosior, with the common names include cane cholla, spiny cholla and walkingstick cactus, is a cactus species of the North American deserts.

== Description ==
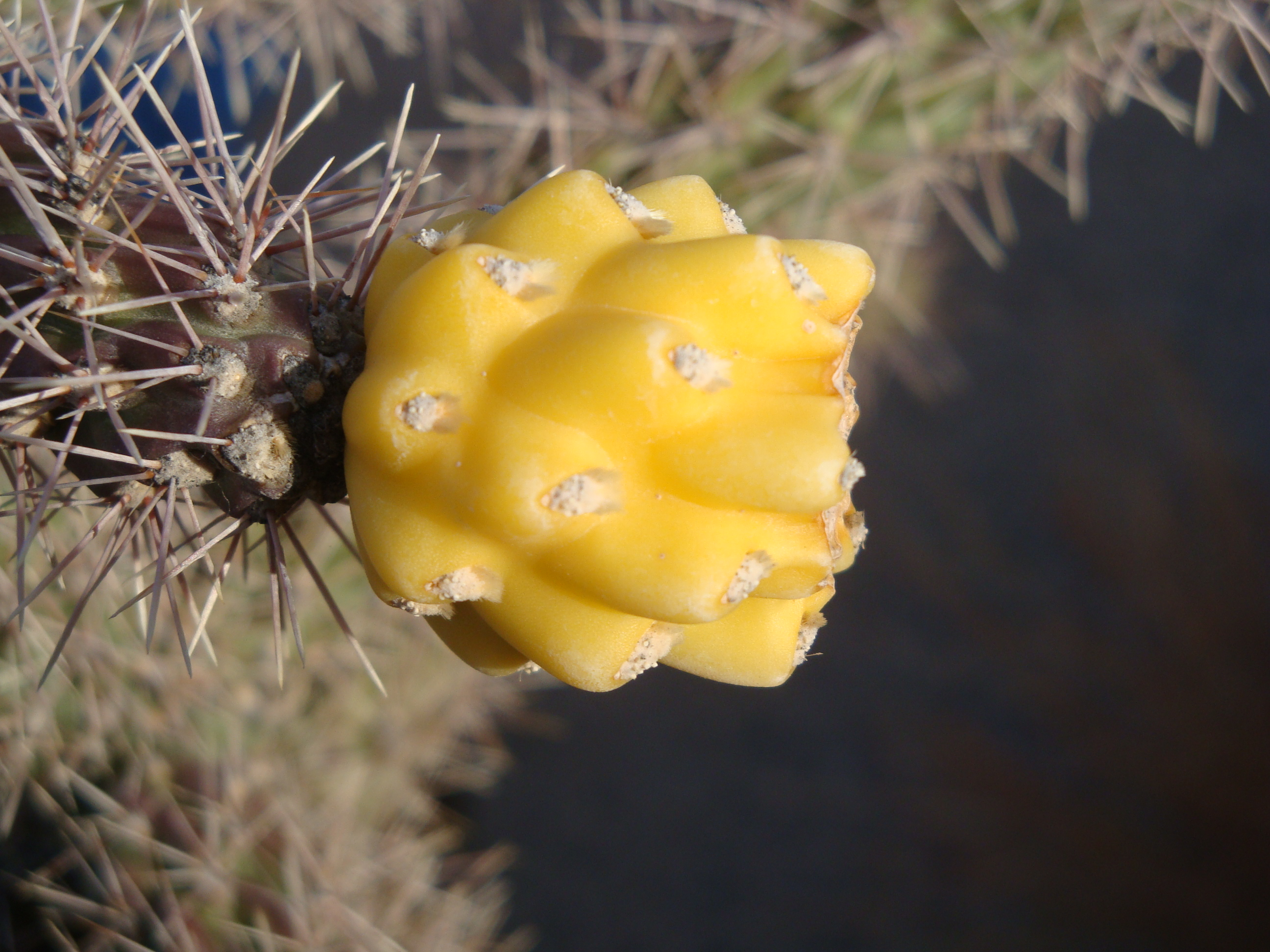
A mature fruit of cylindropuntia spinosior

Cylindropuntia spinosior grows to between 0.4 and 1.2 metres in height and has spine-covered stems. Flowers may be rose, red purple, yellow, or white and appear from spring to early summer. These are followed by fruits that are yellow with occasional red or purple tinges.

== Distribution and habitat ==
It is native to Arizona and New Mexico in the United States; and Chihuahua and Sonora in Mexico.

== Invasive species ==
In Australia, the species is regarded as an emerging weed threat in Queensland where it is known as snake cactus. It is a declared noxious weed in New South Wales where it was first observed to be naturalised in 2000/2001. It is also naturalised in South Australia.
