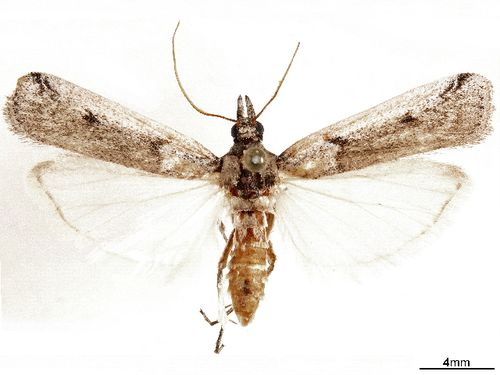

Scientific classification
- Domain: Eukaryota
- Kingdom: Animalia
- Phylum: Arthropoda
- Class: Insecta
- Order: Lepidoptera
- Family: Pyralidae
- Genus: Rumatha
- Species: R. glaucatella

Binomial name
- Rumatha glaucatella (Hulst, 1888)

Synonyms
- Honora glaucatella Hulst, 1888

= Rumatha glaucatella =

Species of moth

Rumatha glaucatella is a species of snout moth in the genus Rumatha. It was described by George Duryea Hulst in 1888. It is found in North America, including southern Texas and Florida.

The wingspan is 15–18 mm for males and 16–20 mm for females.

The larvae feed on Cylindropuntia species, including Cylindropuntia leptocaulis. The larvae are whitish.
