= Rumatha polingella =

Scientific classification
- Kingdom: Animalia
- Phylum: Arthropoda
- Class: Insecta
- Order: Lepidoptera
- Family: Pyralidae
- Genus: Rumatha
- Species: R. polingella

Binomial name
- Rumatha polingella (Dyar, 1906)

Synonyms
- Zophodia polingella Dyar, 1906

Species of moth

Rumatha polingella is a species of snout moth in the genus Rumatha. It was described by Harrison Gray Dyar Jr. in 1906. It is found in North America, including California, Texas and southern Arizona.

The wingspan is 23–34 mm for males and 26–35 mm for females.

The larvae feed on Cylindropuntia species, including Cylindropuntia leptocaulis. They are solitary feeders within the stems of their host plant.
