= Cylindropuntia cholla =

Conservation status
- Least Concern (IUCN 3.1)

Scientific classification
- Kingdom: Plantae
- Clade: Tracheophytes
- Clade: Angiosperms
- Clade: Eudicots
- Order: Caryophyllales
- Family: Cactaceae
- Genus: Cylindropuntia
- Species: C. cholla

Binomial name
- Cylindropuntia cholla (F.A.C.Weber) F.M.Knuth, 1930

Synonyms
- Grusonia cholla (F.A.C.Weber) G.D.Rowley, 2006; Opuntia cholla F.A.C.Weber, 1895 (basionym)

Species of cactus

Cylindropuntia cholla, commonly known as the chainlink cholla or cholla pelona, is a species of succulent flowering plant in the family Cactaceae. It is native to the states of Baja California and Baja California Sur in northwestern Mexico.

== Description ==
Cylindropuntia cholla is a species of cactus that grows as a densely-branched shrub or small tree, reaching 0.5 to 3 meters in height. It has a well-defined trunk, which measures 7 to 15 cm in diameter when mature; when young, the trunk is very spiny, but with age, it loses its spines and develops smooth, yellow-brown bark. The crown of the plant is often dense and broad, with stems growing in almost horizontal whorls.

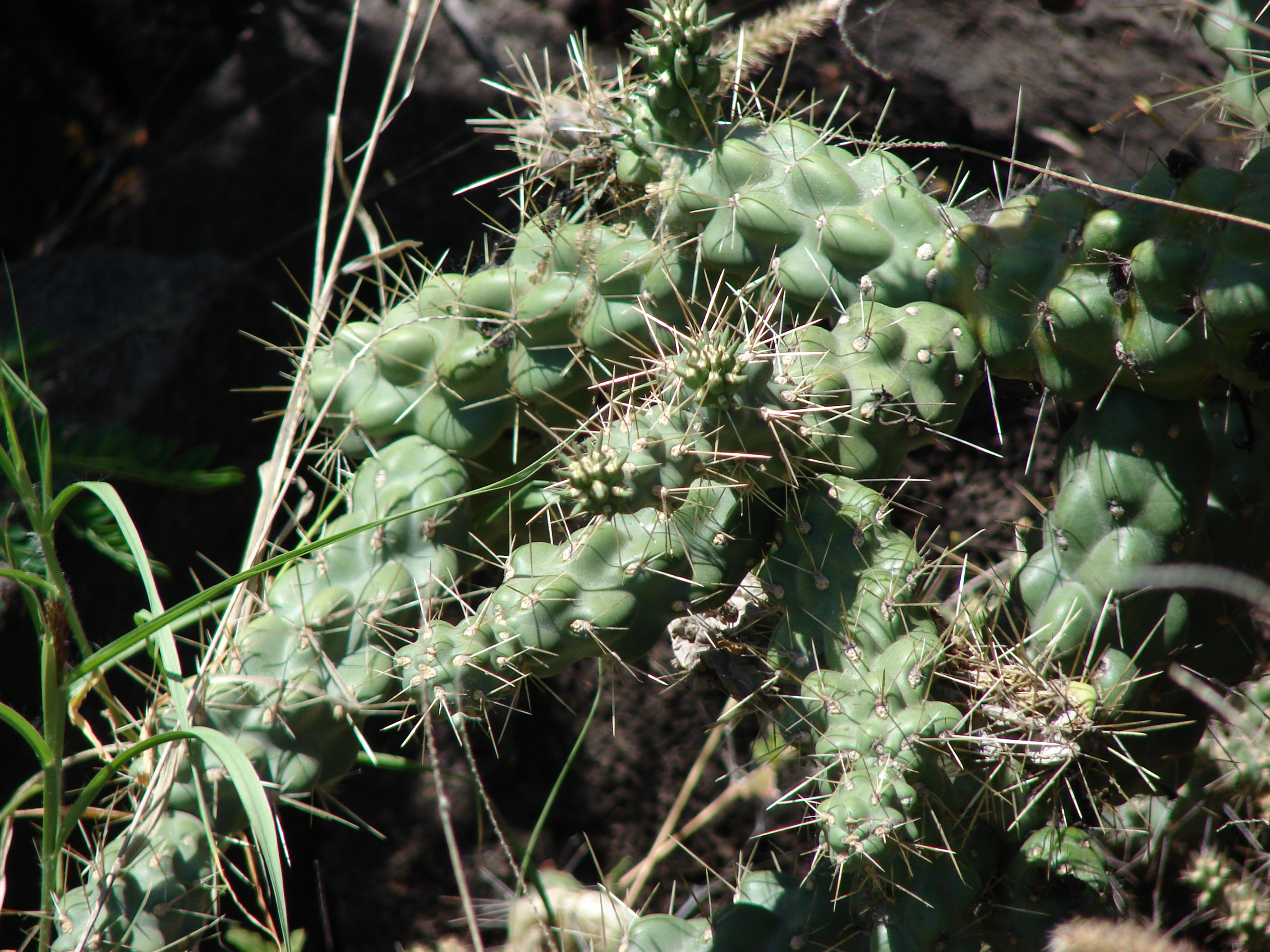
Stems with tubercles

The stems are erect to spreading, articulated, and made up of easily detachable segments. Each segment measures 6 to 11 cm in length and 3.5 to 5 cm in diameter. They are more or less cylindrical in shape and have a light green or blue-green epidermis. This species has large tubercles, which are broadly oval and more or less compressed.

On the ribs are areoles, which are initially cream-colored but become gray with age. The areoles contain glochids, which are dark yellow in color and measure 1.5 to 4 mm in length. Furthermore, this species has small, conical succulent leaves, although these only develop on young stems and fall off prematurely.

Flowers

Most of the areoles have 5 to 16 spines, although some areoles may lack any. The spines are more or less straight, and are covered in a gray, papery epidermal sheath. They measure 2 to 4.5 cm in length and are orange-brown in color with yellow tips. On each areole, there are usually 3 to 7 primary spines and 3 to 11 secondary spines.

The flowers are light pink to dark purple in color, open during the daytime, and are pollinated by bees. They measure up to 3 cm in diameter and have relatively few tepals. The stamens are sensitive, and the filaments close inwards when touched; this functions to cover pollinators in pollen.

The fruits are green, very fleshy, and globose. They are spineless, and measure 1.7 to 5 cm in length and 1.5 to 3.5 cm in diameter.

== Distribution and habitat ==
Cylindropuntia cholla is native to the states of Baja California in northwestern Mexico. It grows primarily in deserts or dry scrubland.

== Ecology ==
In its natural habitat, this species often is unusual in shape due to the ease with which its segments are able to detach from the mother plant, root, and produce many smaller plants nearby. In this species, fruits are very abundant; they persist for years, and usually remain green in color.

Cylindropuntia cholla is closely related to Cylindropuntia fulgida.

== Taxonomy ==
The first description of this species was as Opuntia cholla, a name published in 1895 by the French botanist Frédéric Albert Constantin Weber in the scientific journal Bulletin du Muséum d'Histoire Naturelle 1: 320.

Later, the Danish botanist Frederik Marcus Knuth transferred the species to the genus Cylindropuntia, renaming it Cylindropuntia cholla. He registered these changes in his book Den Nye kaktusbog: 131, published in 1930.

Etymology

- Cylindropuntia: the genus name is derived from the Greek word kýlindros (meaning "cylinder") and the similar genus Opuntia, referring to the cylindrical form of this genus' stems.
- cholla: the specific epithet is derived from the common name of this species (which is also used for many other Cylindropuntia species).

== Conservation status ==
On the IUCN Red List, Cylindropuntia cholla is classified as being of Least Concern (LC).

There are no known significant threats to the species' survival; it is widespread and very common (to the point of sometimes becoming a weed) throughout its range.

== Cultivation ==
This species is primarily cultivated as an ornamental, and it is usually propagated via cuttings. Its substrate should be well-draining, since it is prone to rot under humid and cool conditions.

== Gallery ==
Plant in growth

Plant in habitat in Loreto, Baja California Sur, Mexico

Stems

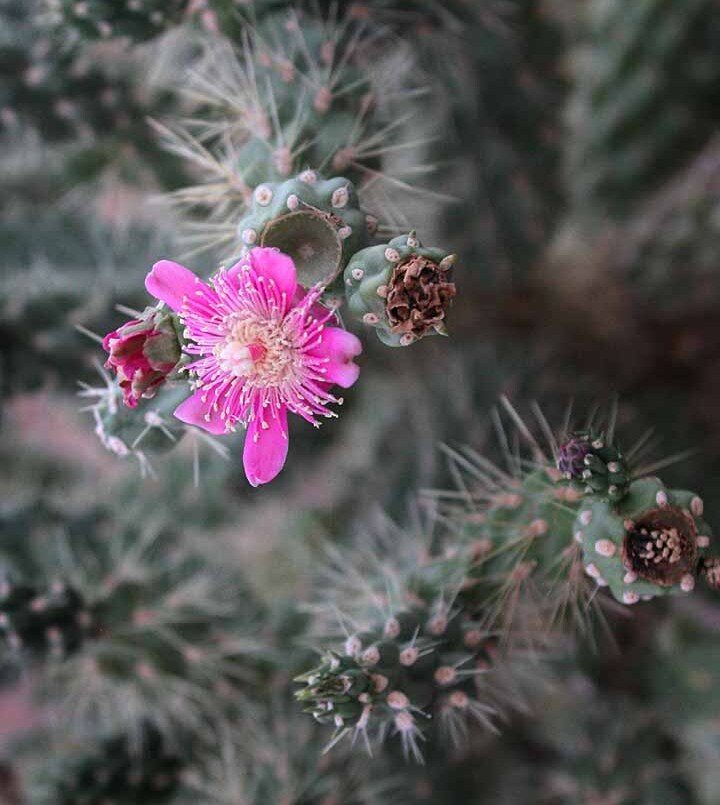
Flower

Fruits
