= Pencil cactus =

Pencil cactus may refer to:

- Cylindropuntia leptocaulis, a cactus native to the Southwestern United States and Northern Mexico
- Euphorbia tirucalli, a shrub or small tree with pencil-thick succulent branches that is native to most of Africa and as well as parts of the Arabian Peninsula
