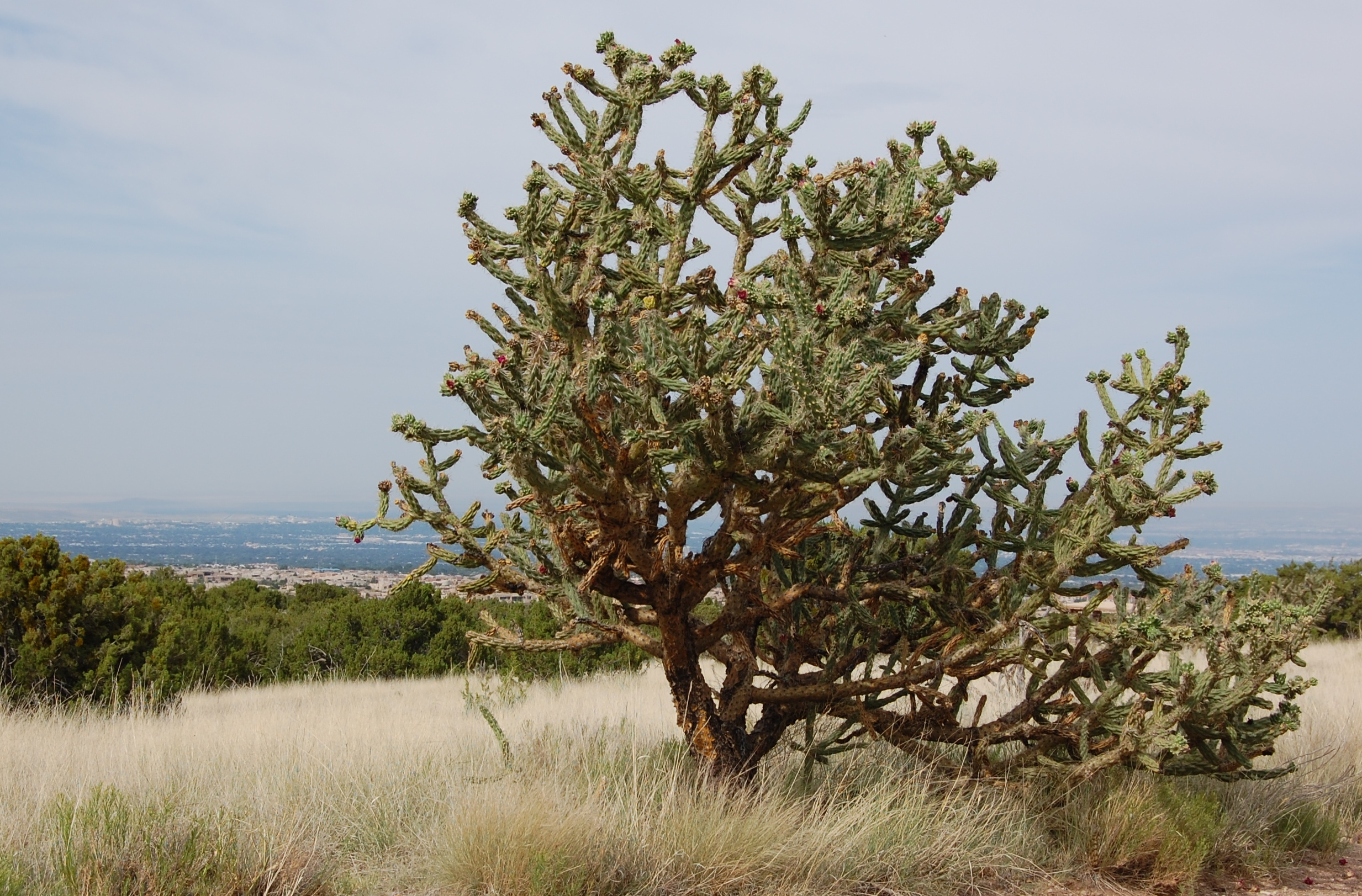

Conservation status
- Least Concern (IUCN 3.1)

- Secure (NatureServe)

Scientific classification
- Kingdom: Plantae
- Clade: Tracheophytes
- Clade: Angiosperms
- Clade: Eudicots
- Order: Caryophyllales
- Family: Cactaceae
- Genus: Cylindropuntia
- Species: C. imbricata

Binomial name
- Cylindropuntia imbricata (Haw.) F.M.Knuth

Subspecies
- Cylindropuntia imbricata subsp. argentea (M.S.Anthony) U.Guzmán; Cylindropuntia imbricata subsp. imbricata; Cylindropuntia imbricata subsp. lloydii (Rose) U.Guzmán; Cylindropuntia imbricata subsp. rosea (DC.) M.A.Baker; Cylindropuntia imbricata subsp. spinosior (Engelm.) M.A.Baker, Cloud-H. & Majure; Cylindropuntia imbricata subsp. spinotecta (Griffiths) M.A.Baker

Synonyms
- List: Cactus imbricatus (Haw.) Lem. (1868); Cereus imbricatus Haw. (1821); Echinocactus imbricatus (Haw.) Paxton (1840); Grusonia imbricata (Haw.) G.D.Rowley (2006); Opuntia imbricata (Haw.) DC. (1828)

= Cylindropuntia imbricata =

Species of cactus

Cylindropuntia imbricata, the cane cholla (walking stick cholla, tree cholla, or chainlink cactus), is a cactus found in the Southwestern United States and northern Mexico, including some cooler regions in comparison to many other cacti. It occurs primarily in the arid regions of the Southwestern United States in the states of Kansas, Oklahoma, Texas, New Mexico, Arizona, Colorado, and Nevada. It is often conspicuous because of its shrubby or even tree-like size, its silhouette, and its long-lasting yellowish fruits.

== Distribution and habitat ==
The cane cholla's range is the arid regions of Nevada, Arizona, New Mexico, Colorado, Oklahoma, Kansas, and Texas, south to Durango, Zacatecas, and San Luis Potosí. It occurs at altitudes from 1,200 to 2,300 m (3,900 to 7,500 ft) and is hardy for a cactus (USDA Zone 5A).

In parts of its range, often just below the pinyon-juniper belt, it can be abundant, surrounded by low grasses and forbs that are brown most of the year; in such places chollas are conspicuous since they are the only tall and green plant. Plants may form thickets or be spaced at a few times their width in "gardens".

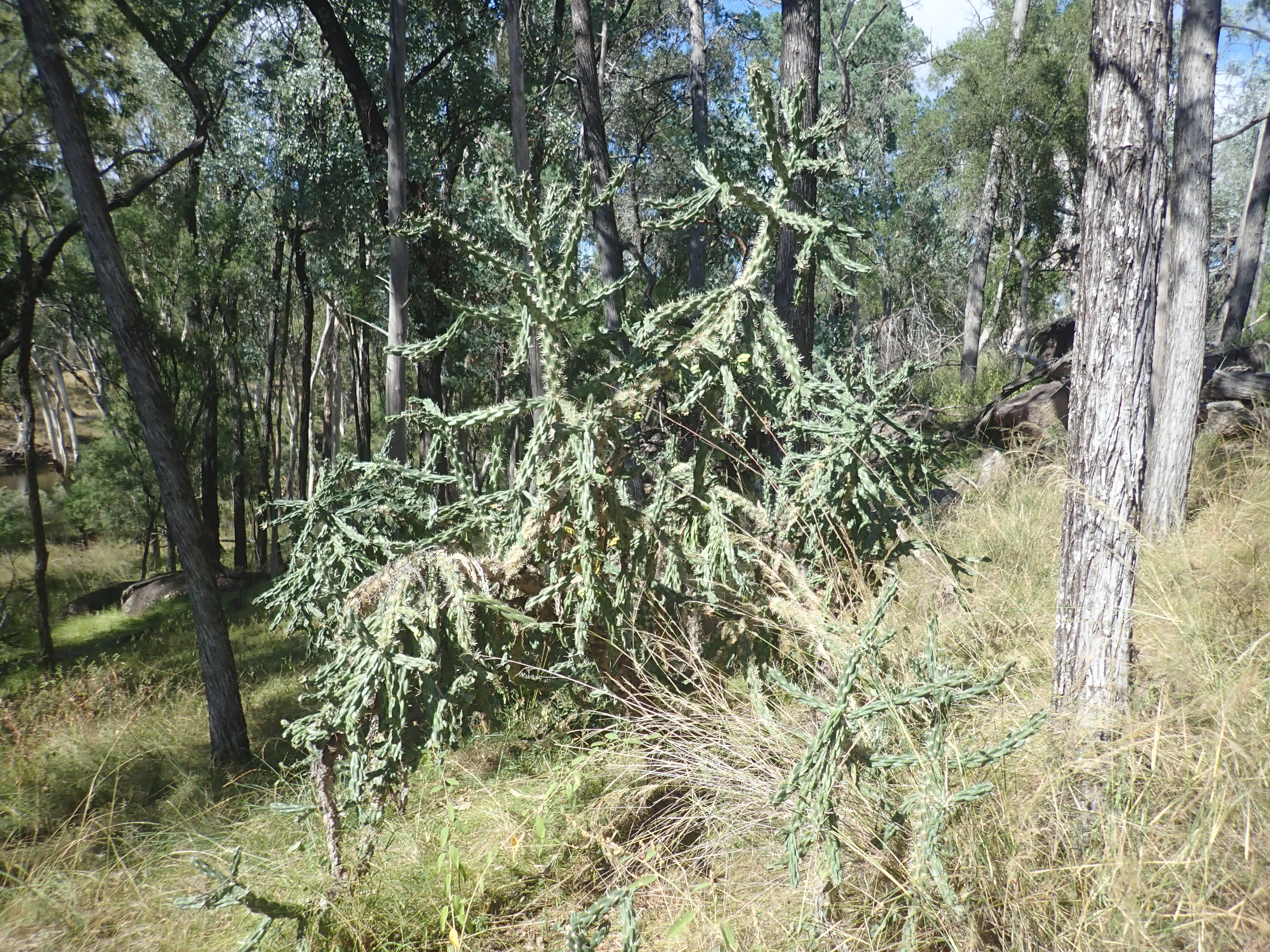
invasive Kwiambal NP, NSW, Australia

This species is a noxious invasive in Australia in old mining localities and along watercourses. It is known there by the common names of Devil's rope cactus or Devil's rope pear. It is a declared noxious weed in New South Wales and also occurs in Queensland, Northern Territory, Victoria, and South Australia.

== Description ==
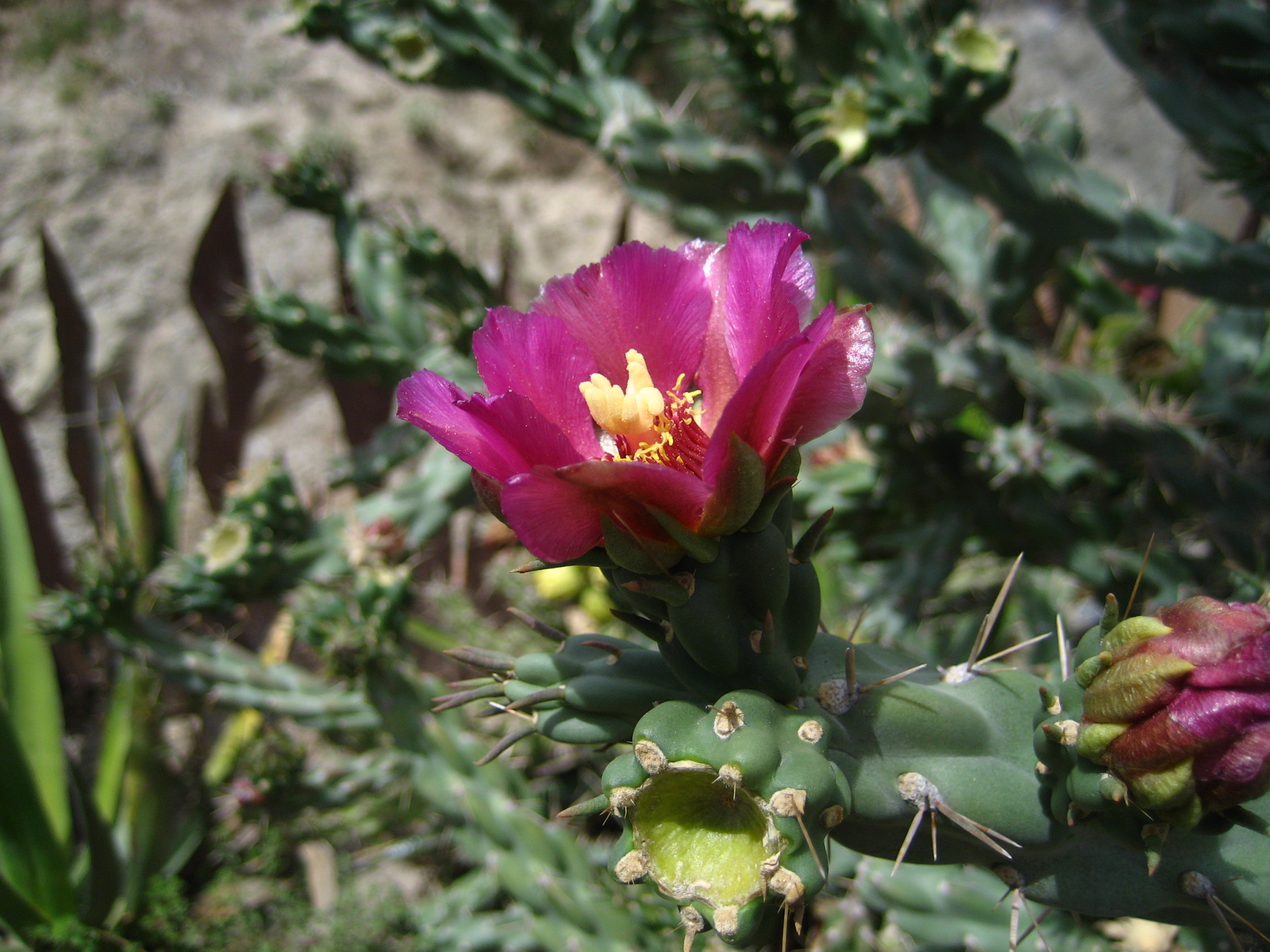
Cane cholla blossom

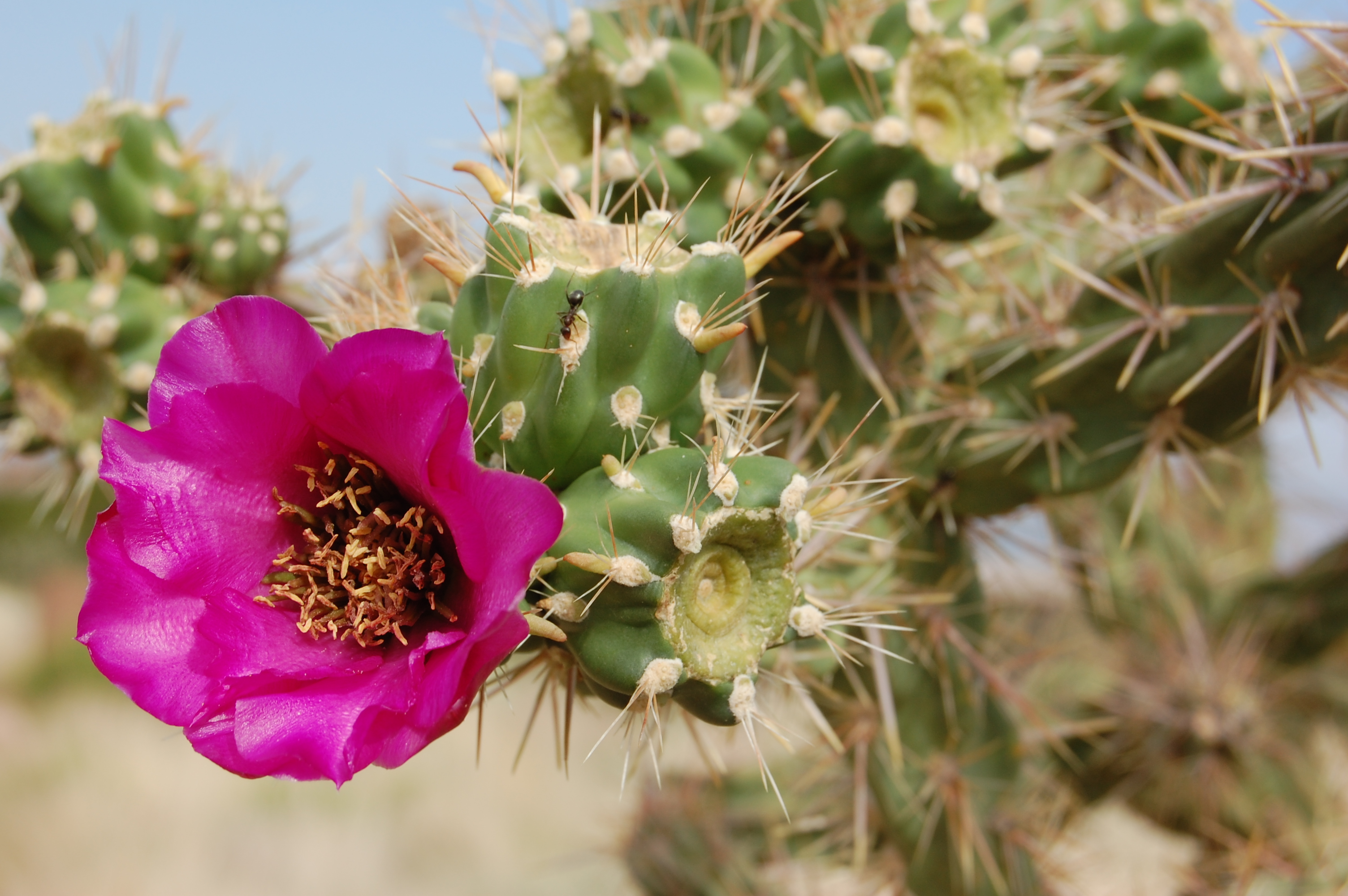

The above-ground part consists of much-branched cylindrical stems, the end joints being about 3 cm (1.2 in) in diameter. The joints, unlike those of some chollas, are hard to detach. The stems are highly tubercular (lumpy) with a pattern of long oval lumps. A typical height is about 1 m (3 ft), but exceptionally it can grow to 4.6 m (15 ft) with a "trunk" diameter of 25 cm (9.8 in). The width is often similar to or somewhat greater than the height. The stems are armed with clusters of up to about 10 red to pink spines, which may be 3 cm (1.2 in) long and are barbed and sharp enough to easily penetrate leather gardening gloves. The stems and fruits also have many spines or "glochids" about 1 mm (0.04 in) long that can detach and stick in the skin.

There are two kinds of stems or "cladodes": long plagiotropic, bearing flowers at the ends and falling off after a few years, and long orthotropic, primarily serving for support and transport and staying on the plant. Plagiotropic stems grow in a star- or crown-like pattern around a central orthotropic stem. This species blooms in late spring or early summer. The flowers are purple or magenta, rarely rose-pink, about 5 cm (2.0 in) wide. The fruits are yellowish, tubercular like the stems, and shaped something like the frustum of a cone, with a hollow at the wide end where the flower fell off; they are often mistaken for flowers. The plant retains them all winter. They are dry and bland, though the Indians of Arizona and New Mexico are said to have eaten them.

In addition to sexual reproduction, the tree cholla reproduces when stem joints fall to the ground and take root. Thus, this species spreads, and its spread is hard to control, especially where animals defecate seeds and carry stem joints stuck to their hide some distance from the parent plant. (Some cows, "cholla eaters", learn to eat cholla fruits despite the pain.) "Waves of invasion" typically occur four or five years after drought combined with grazing, probably because this combination exposes soil on which the stem joints can take root.

== Taxonomy ==
Cylindropuntia imbricata was scientifically described as Cereus imbricatus by the botanist Adrian Hardy Haworth in 1821. Augustin Pyramus de Candolle moved it to Opuntia in 1828 and Joseph Paxton published it in Echinocactus in 1840. It was given its accepted placement in Cylindropuntia in 1930 by Frederik Marcus Knuth.

== Ecology ==
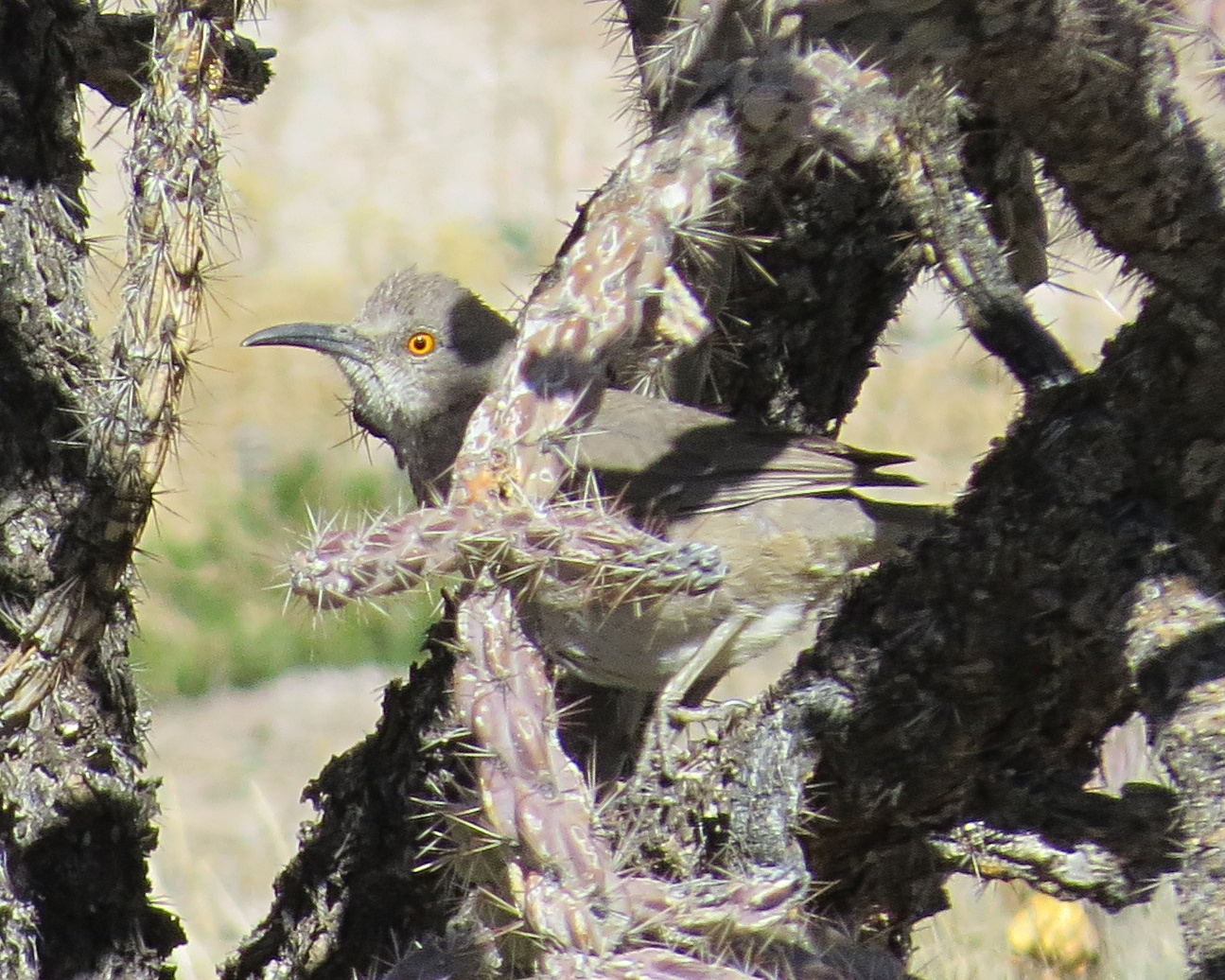
Curve-billed thrasher in cover.

The fruits are also eaten by various wild birds and mammals, including pronghorn, desert bighorn sheep, and deer. The thorny plants provide escape for cover for many small animals.

The leafcutter bee Lithurgus apicalis has been observed to pollinate the flowers.

== Uses ==
The plants are sometimes grown as ornamentals. Dead stems decay to leave a hollow wooden tube with a pattern of lengthwise slits. These are sometimes used as canes or to make curios. The Roman Catholic Penitentes of New Mexico formerly tied fresh stems to their bare backs in Holy Week processions. The Zuni people use the imbricata variety ceremonially.

== Images ==
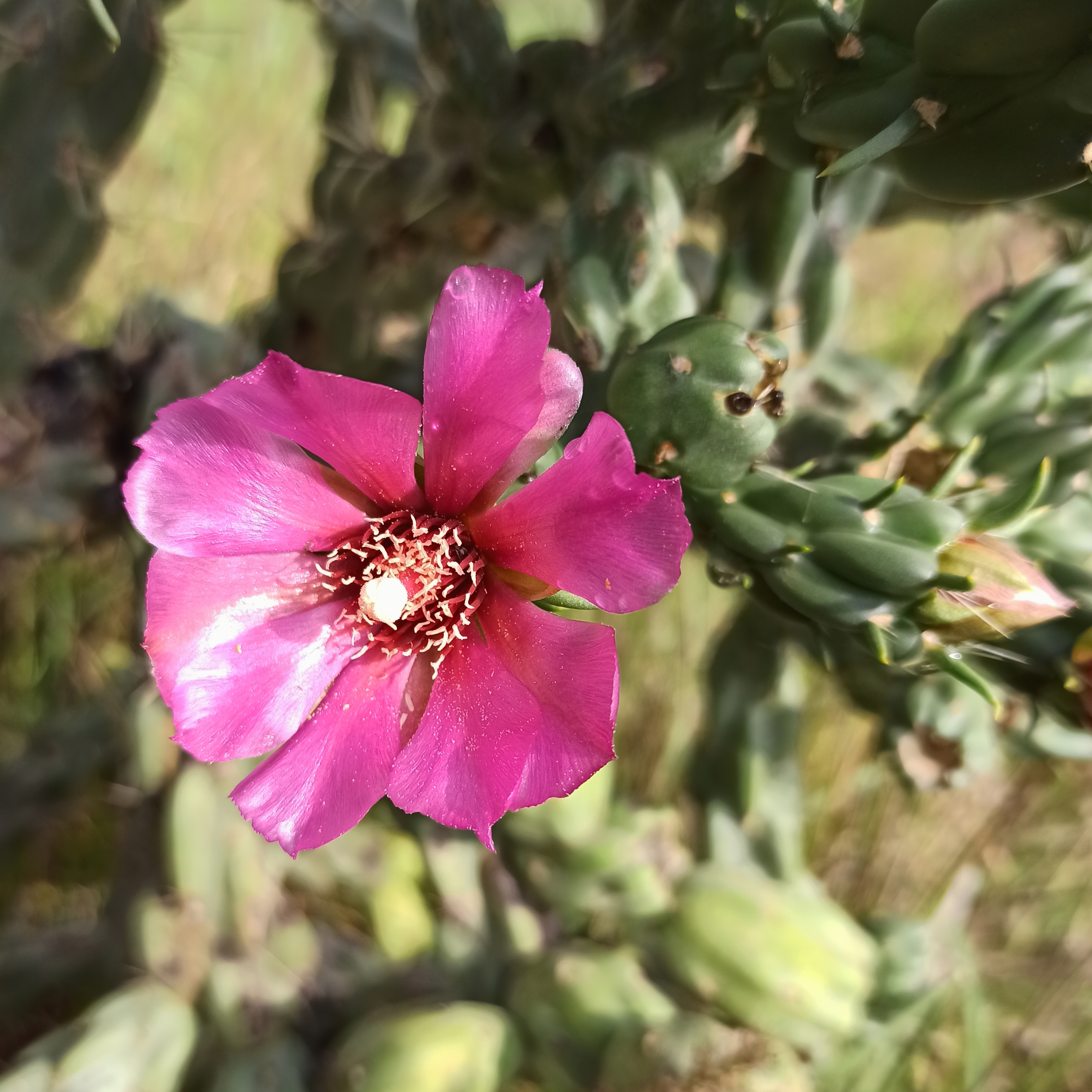
Flower

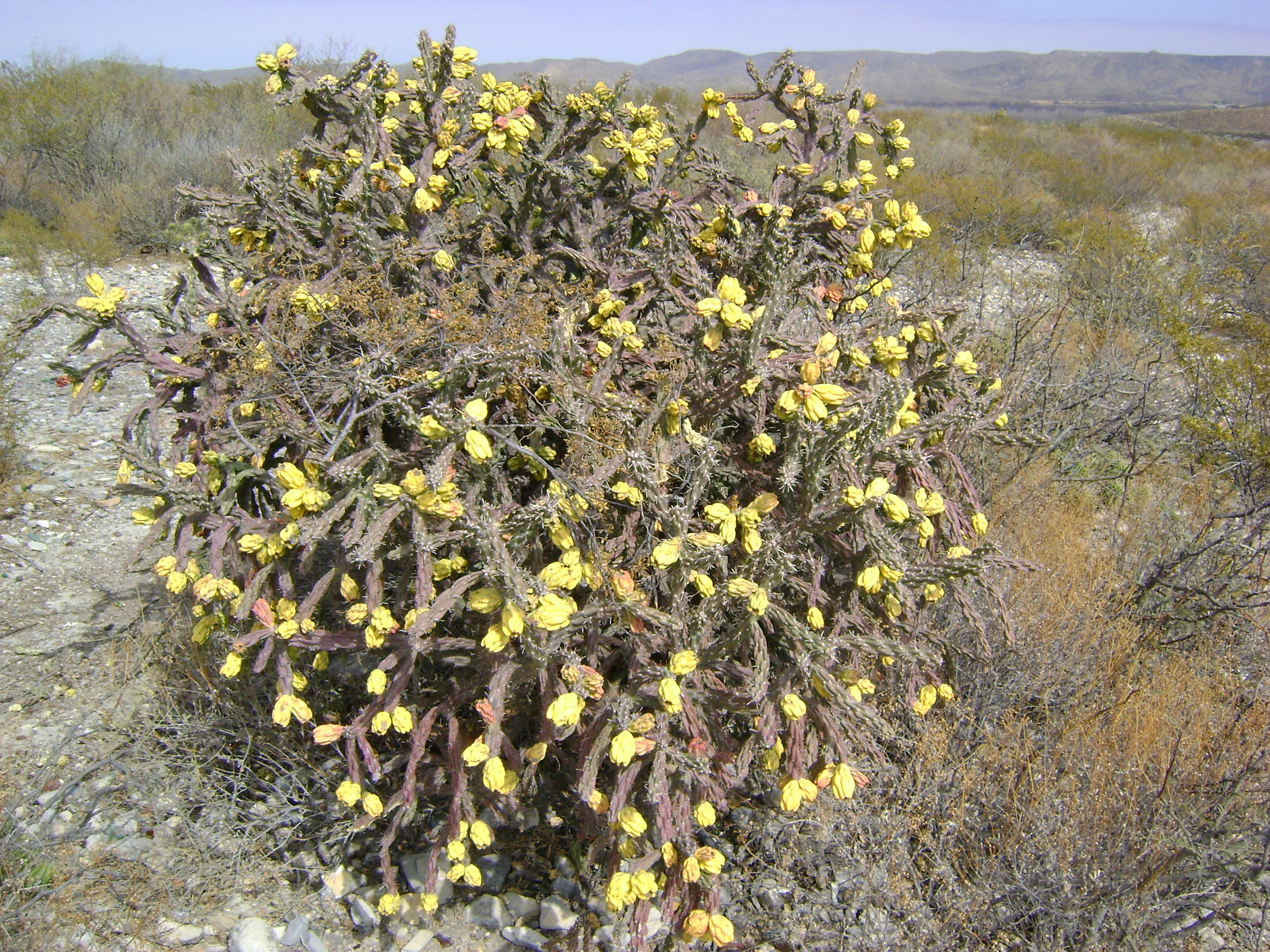
Much yellow fruit at Parras De La Fuente, Cuahuila

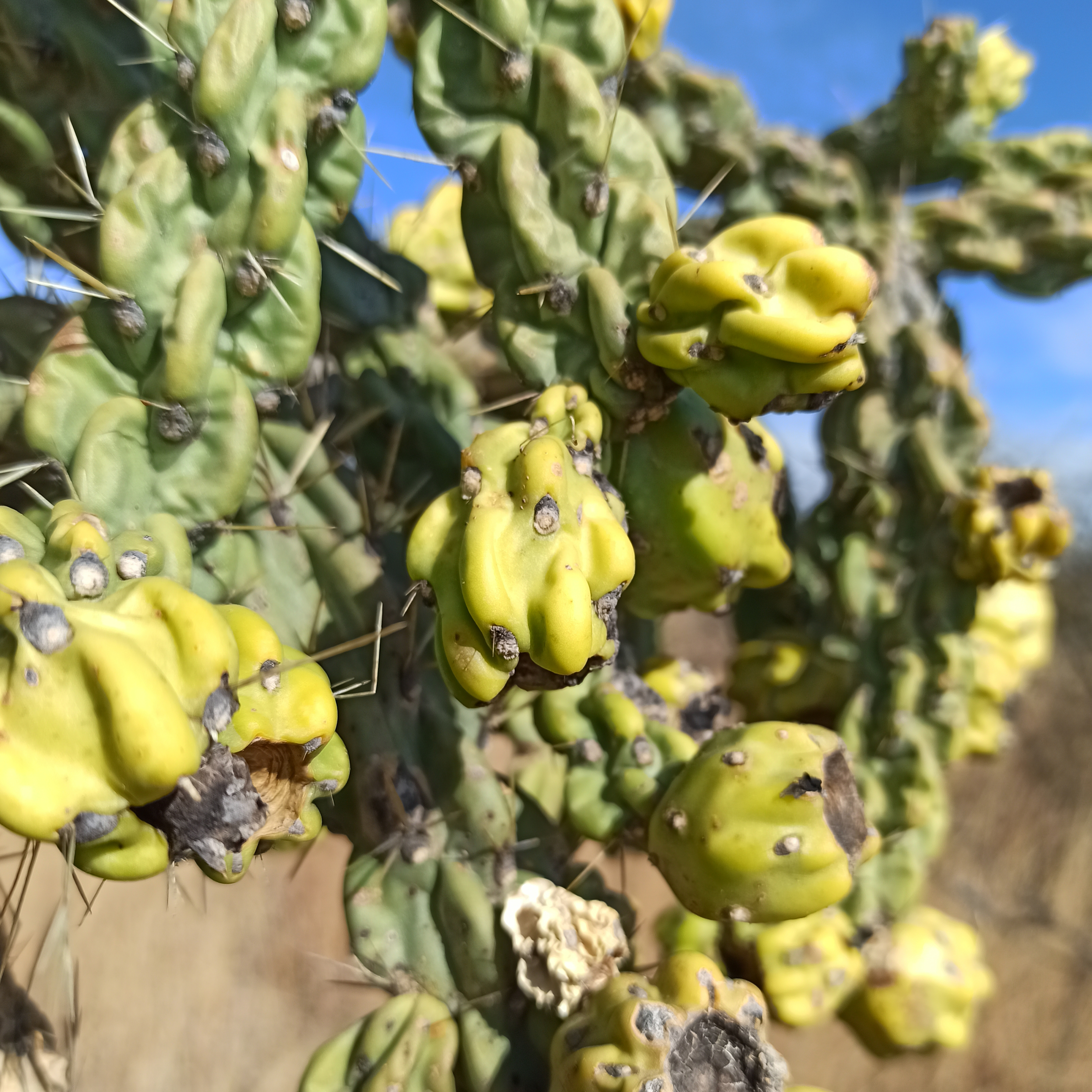
Fruits at Dolores Hidalgo, Guanajuato

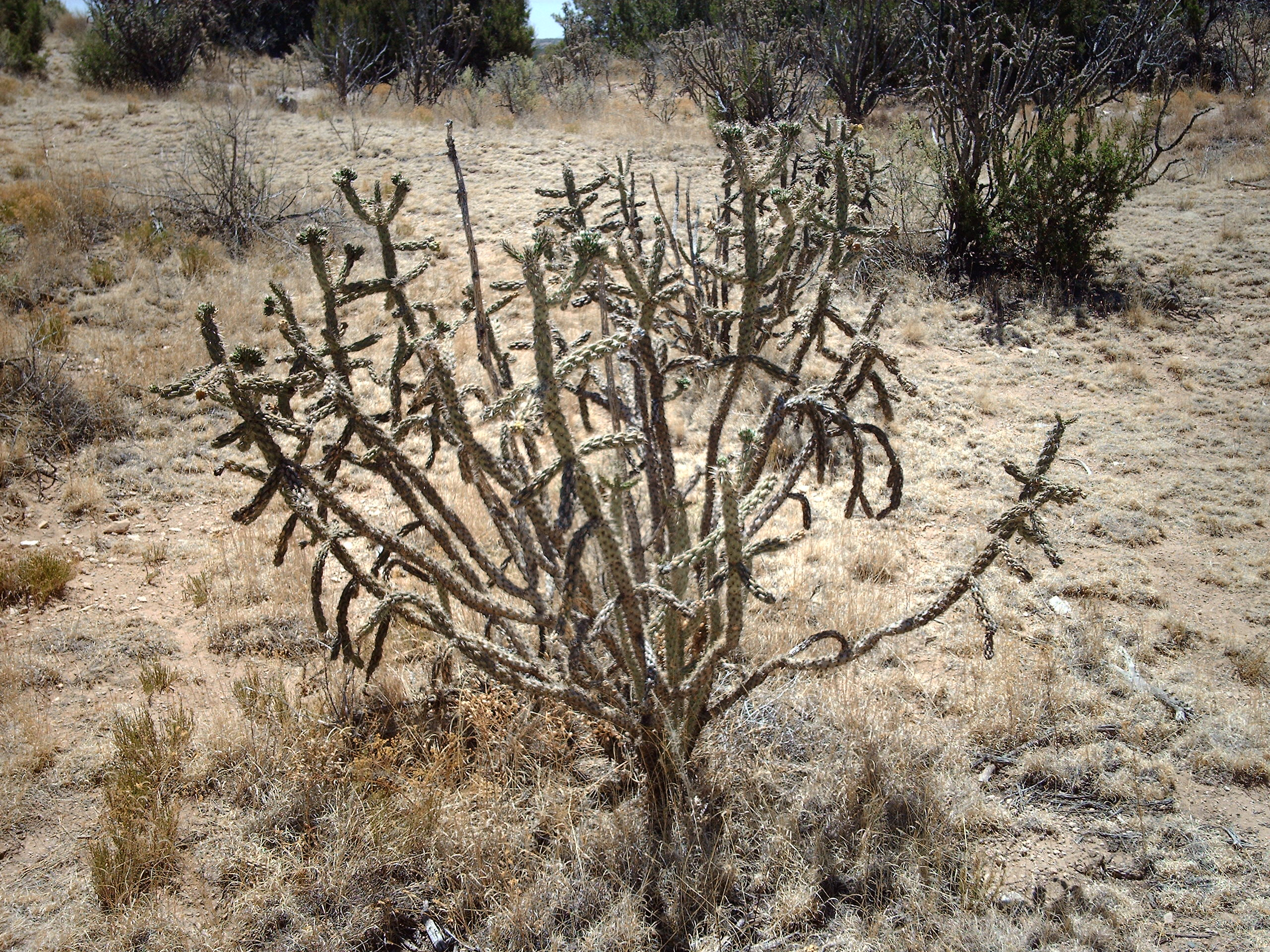
At Salinas Pueblo Missions National Monument

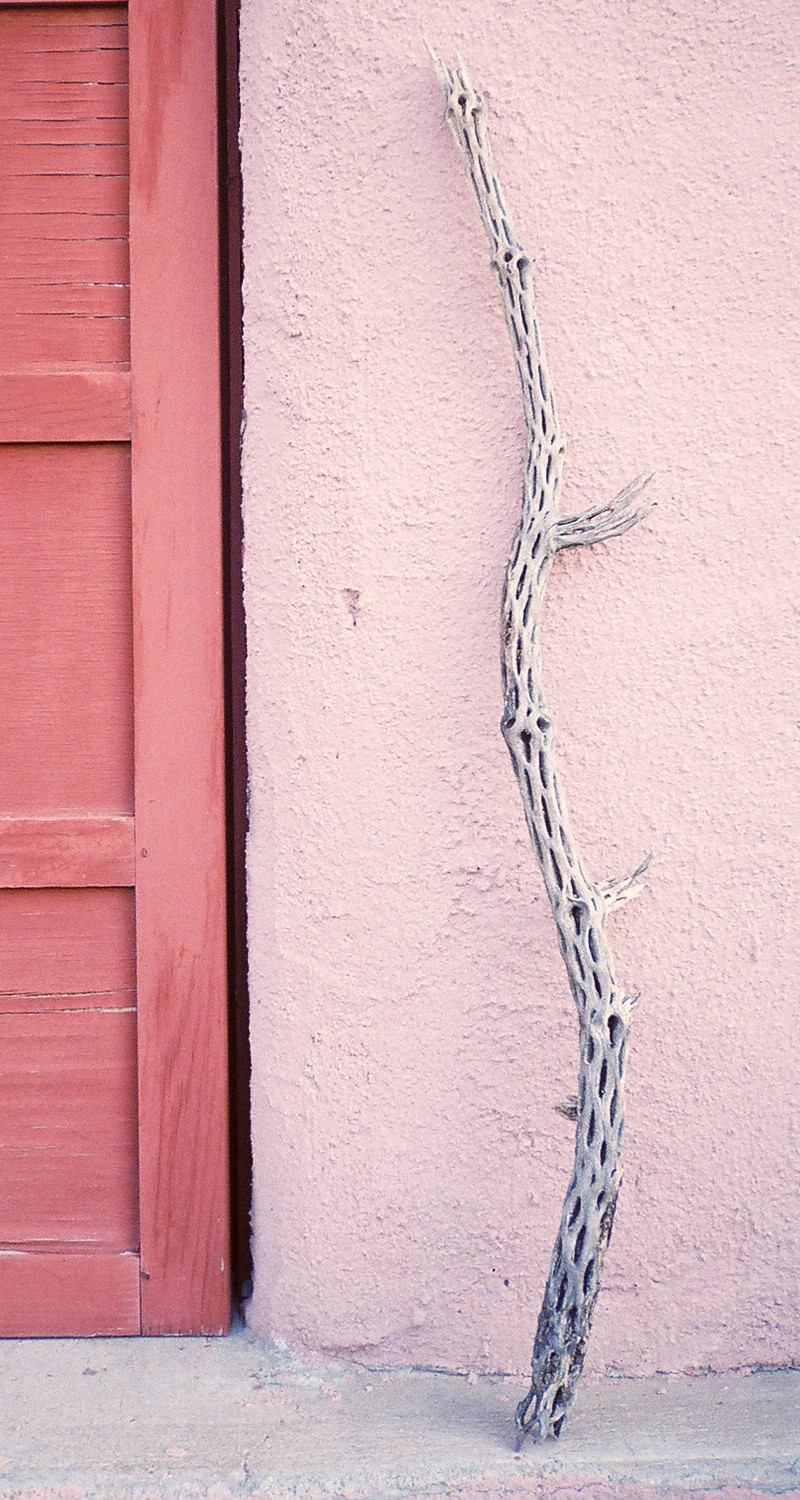
"Cane" (dried stem)

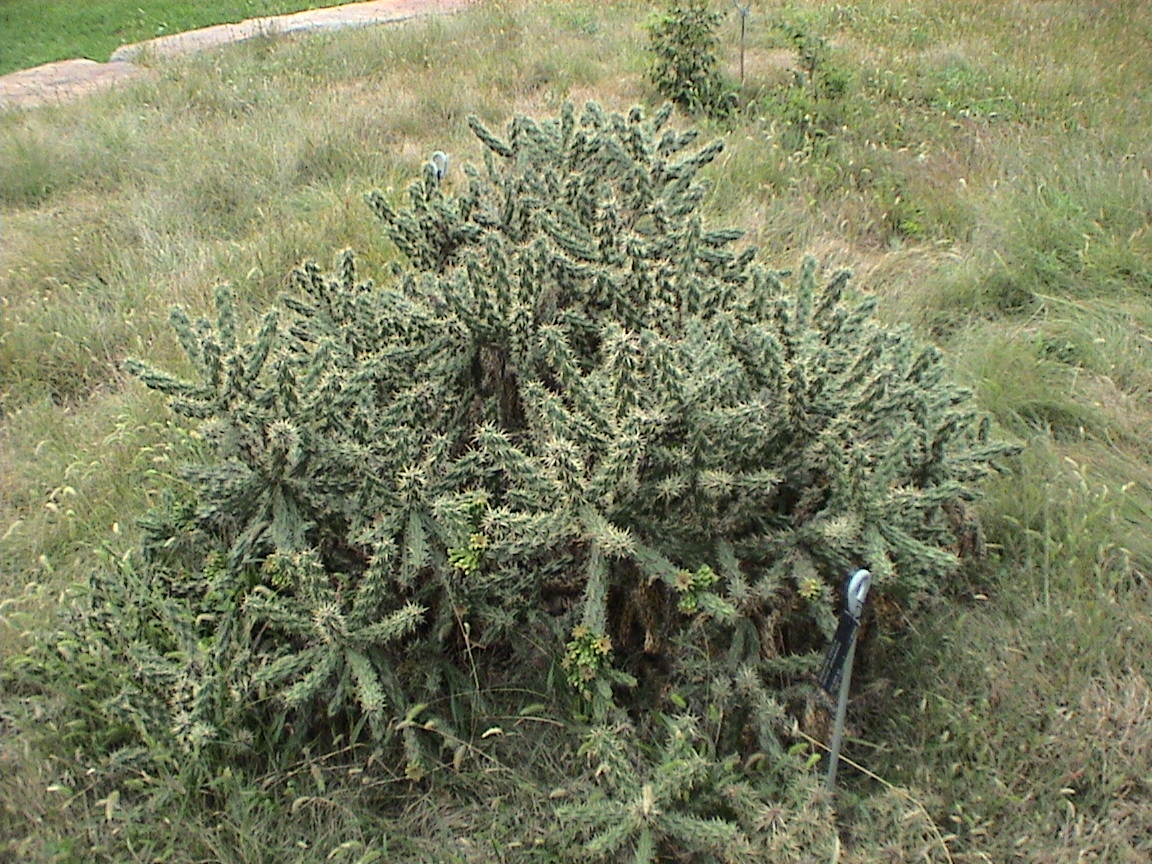
In Illinois

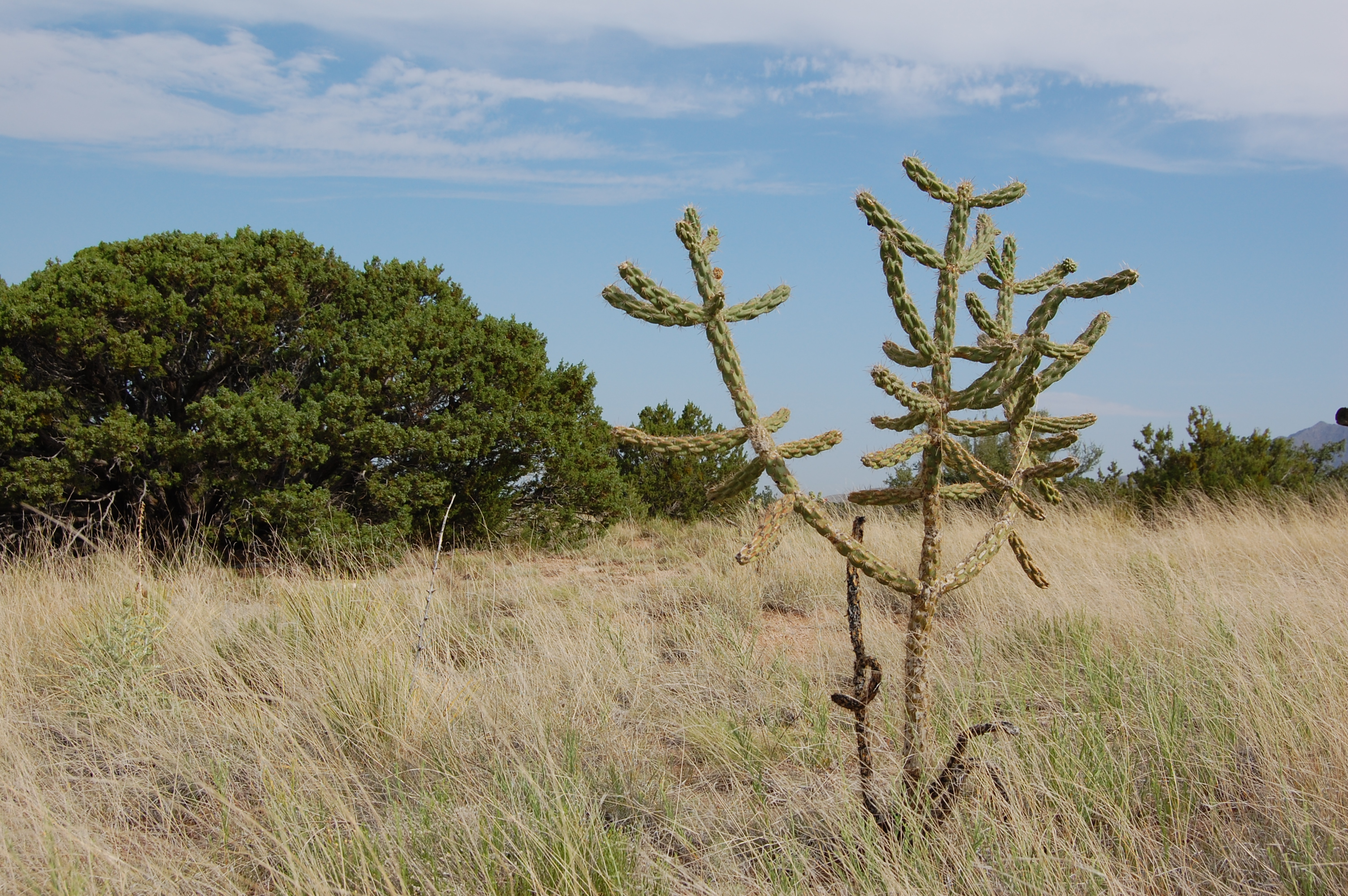
In Albuquerque, New Mexico
