= Rumatha bihinda =

Scientific classification
- Kingdom: Animalia
- Phylum: Arthropoda
- Class: Insecta
- Order: Lepidoptera
- Family: Pyralidae
- Genus: Rumatha
- Species: R. bihinda

Binomial name
- Rumatha bihinda (Dyar, 1922)

Synonyms
- Zophodia bihinda Dyar, 1922

Species of moth

Rumatha bihinda is a species of snout moth in the genus Rumatha. It was described by Harrison Gray Dyar Jr. in 1922. It is found in North America, including California, Texas, New Mexico, Arizona and Nevada.

The wingspan is 30–35 mm for males and 32–36 mm for females.

The larvae feed on Cylindropuntia species. They are solitary feeders within the stems of their host plant.
