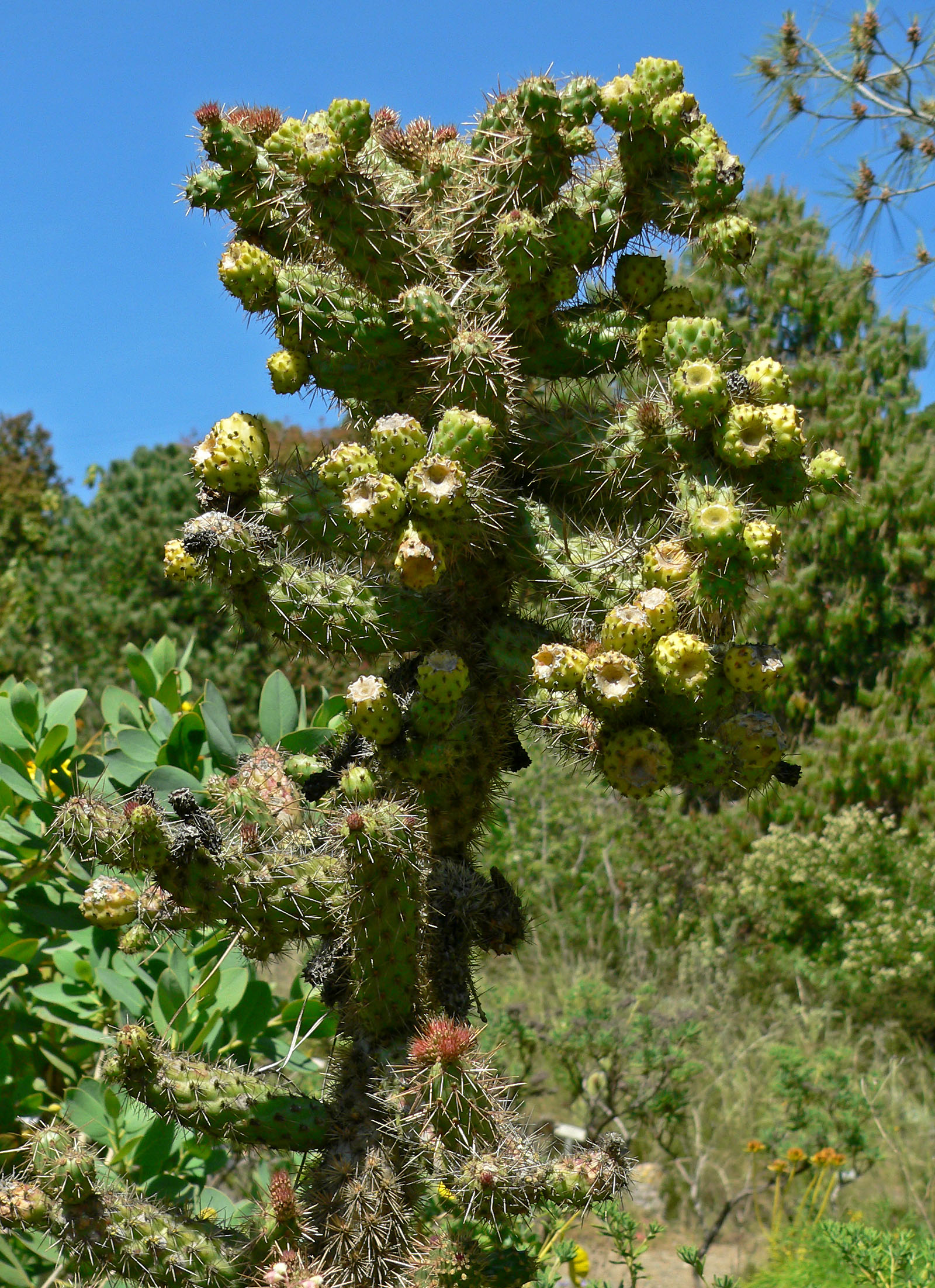

Scientific classification
- Kingdom: Plantae
- Clade: Embryophytes
- Clade: Tracheophytes
- Clade: Angiosperms
- Clade: Eudicots
- Order: Caryophyllales
- Family: Cactaceae
- Genus: Cylindropuntia
- Species: C. prolifera

Binomial name
- Cylindropuntia prolifera (Engelm.) F.M.Knuth

Synonyms
- Opuntia prolifera

= Cylindropuntia prolifera =

Species of cactus

Cylindropuntia prolifera, known by the common name Coastal cholla, is a species of cactus.

== Description ==
Cylindropuntia prolifera is a mostly erect, treelike cactus which can approach 3 meters in maximum height. The gray-green segments are narrow and cylindrical, surfaced in fleshy tubercles bearing many brown or reddish spines up to 2 centimeters long. The flowers are reddish purple and often borne on the fruits of previous seasons. Fruits grow in chains of up to 5 and are green in color.

== Distribution ==
Cylindropuntia prolifera is native to Southern California and Baja California, where it grows in coastal sage scrub, chaparral, and beach and bluff habitat. It occurs from Santa Barbara County south.

== See also ==
- California coastal sage and chaparral - (subecoregion)
