= C. ramosissima =

C. ramosissima may refer to:

- Coleogyne ramosissima, the blackbrush, a thorny aromatic shrub species native to the deserts of the southwestern United States
- Cylindropuntia ramosissima, the diamond cholla or branched pencil cholla, a cactus species native to the Mojave and Sonoran Deserts of the Southwestern United States, California, and Northwestern Mexico, and to Baja California and its Islas San Benito
