= O. fulgida =

O. fulgida may refer to:

- Opuntia fulgida, a cholla cactus
- Ovachlamys fulgida, a land snail
