= Snake cactus =

Snake cactus is a common name which may refer to the following species of cactus:

- Acanthocereus tetragonus
- Bergerocactus emoryi (the golden cereus)
- Cylindropuntia spinosior
- Echinocereus pensilis
- Nyctocereus serpentinus
- Species in the genus Selenicereus
