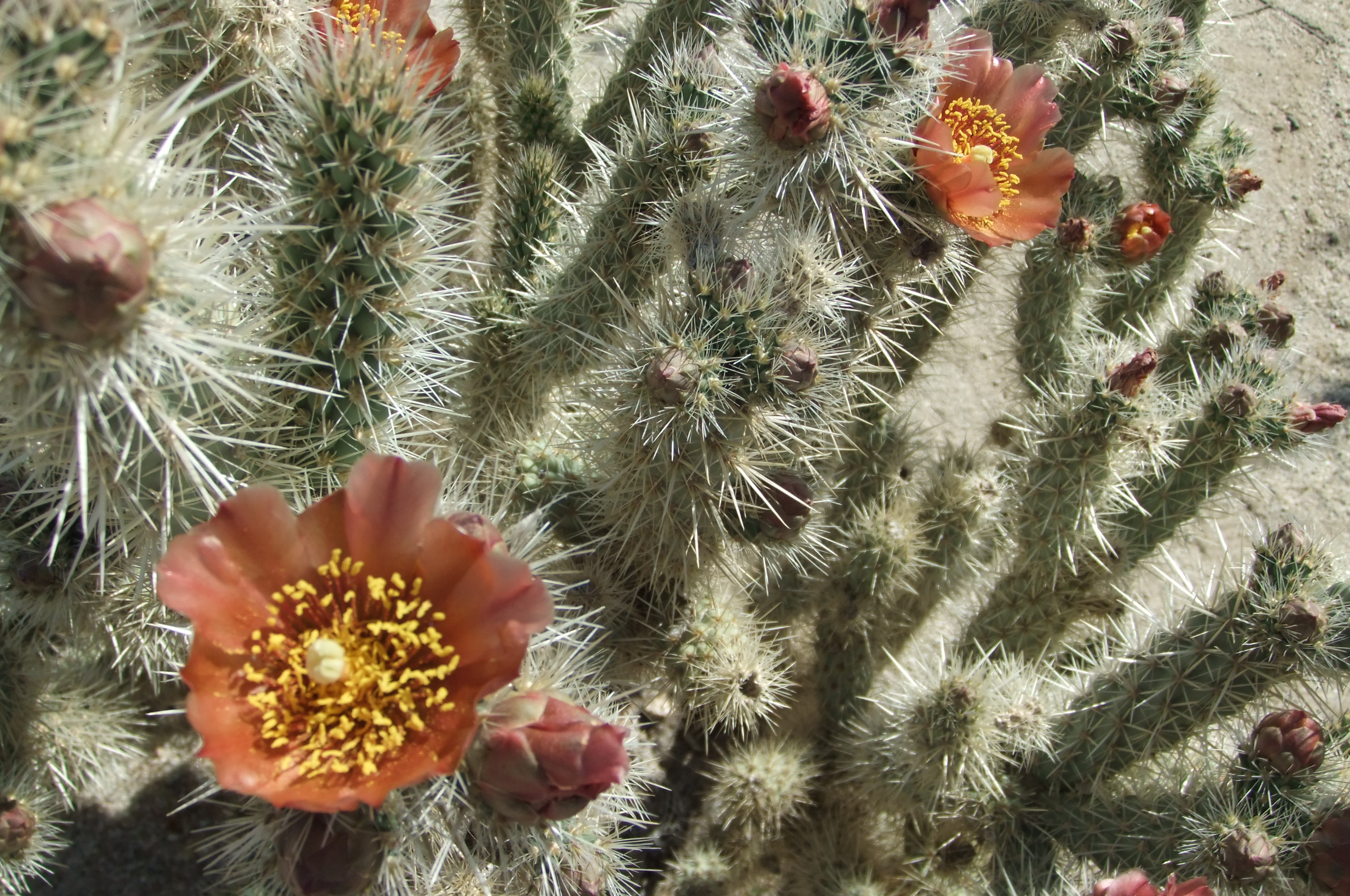

Scientific classification
- Kingdom: Plantae
- Clade: Tracheophytes
- Clade: Angiosperms
- Clade: Eudicots
- Order: Caryophyllales
- Family: Cactaceae
- Genus: Cylindropuntia
- Species: C. wolfii

Binomial name
- Cylindropuntia wolfii (L.D. Benson) J. Rebman

Synonyms
- Opuntia wolfii

= Cylindropuntia wolfii =

Species of cactus

Cylindropuntia wolfii is a species of cactus known by the common name Wolf's cholla.

== Distribution ==
Cylindropuntia wolfii is native to Sonoran Desert, in the Colorado Desert of Southern California, and in Baja California, Mexico. It grows in dry, rocky desert habitat.

== Description ==
Cylindropuntia wolfii is an erect cactus which can approach 2 meters in maximum height. It has many narrow branches made up of woolly, yellowish green, cylindrical segments, the surface divided into wide tubercles bearing many brownish spines up to 3 centimeters in length.

The flower is brownish purple outside to yellowish green in the center. The bumpy, spiny, dry fruit is up to 3 centimeters long.
