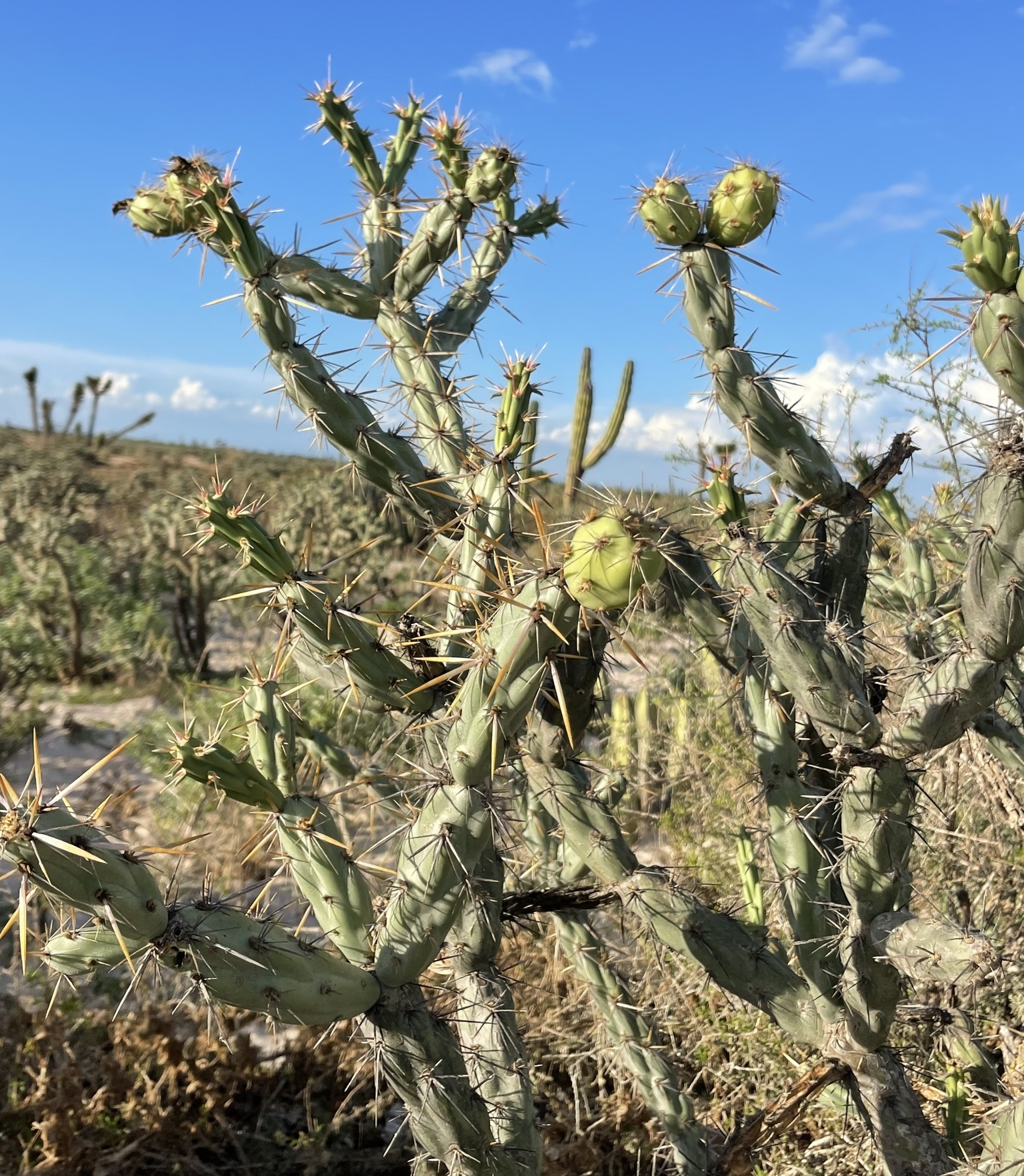

Scientific classification
- Kingdom: Plantae
- Clade: Tracheophytes
- Clade: Angiosperms
- Clade: Eudicots
- Order: Caryophyllales
- Family: Cactaceae
- Genus: Cylindropuntia
- Species: C. calmalliana

Binomial name
- Cylindropuntia calmalliana (J.M.Coult.) F.M.Knuth

Synonyms
- Opuntia calmalliana J.M.Coult.

= Cylindropuntia calmalliana =

Species of cactus

Cylindropuntia calmalliana is a species of flowering plant in the family Cactaceae, native to Mexico (Baja California). It was first described in 1896 by John Merle Coulter, as Opuntia calmalliana.
