= Rumatha =

Scientific classification
- Domain: Eukaryota
- Kingdom: Animalia
- Phylum: Arthropoda
- Class: Insecta
- Order: Lepidoptera
- Family: Pyralidae
- Subfamily: Phycitinae
- Genus: Rumatha; Heinrich, 1939

Genus of moths

Rumatha is a genus of snout moths. It was described by Carl Heinrich in 1939.

== Species ==
- Rumatha bihinda (Dyar, 1922)
- Rumatha glaucatella (Hulst, 1888)
- Rumatha jacumba Neunzig, 1997
- Rumatha polingella (Dyar, 1906)
