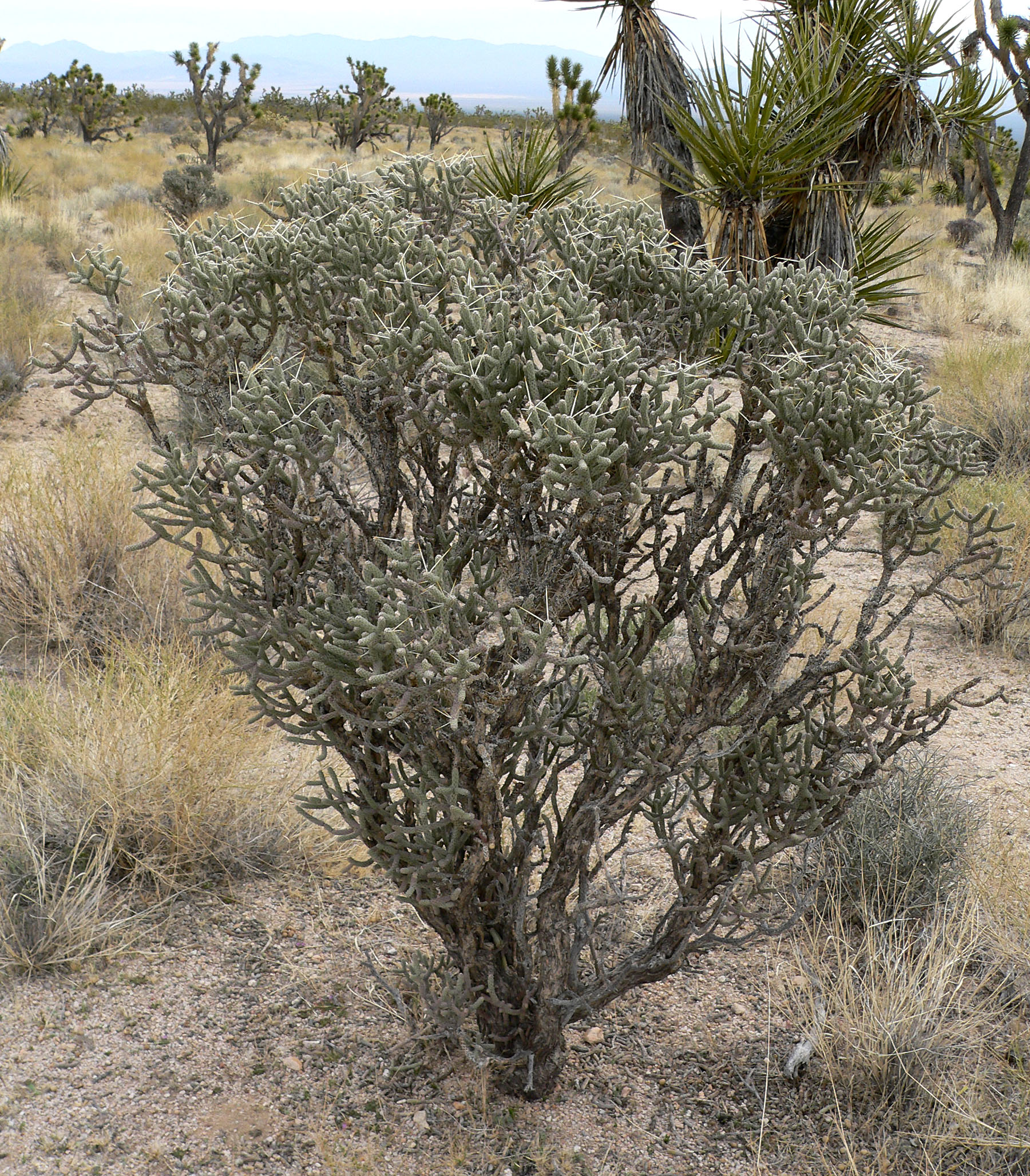

Scientific classification
- Kingdom: Plantae
- Clade: Tracheophytes
- Clade: Angiosperms
- Clade: Eudicots
- Order: Caryophyllales
- Family: Cactaceae
- Genus: Cylindropuntia
- Species: C. ramosissima

Binomial name
- Cylindropuntia ramosissima (Engelm.) F.M.Knuth

Synonyms
- Opuntia ramosissima

= Cylindropuntia ramosissima =

Species of cactus

Cylindropuntia ramosissima is a species of cactus known by the common names Diamond cholla and Branched pencil cholla.

== Distribution ==
Cylindropuntia ramosissima is native to the Mojave and Sonoran Deserts of the Southwestern United States, California, and Northwestern Mexico, and to Baja California and its Islas San Benito.

== Description ==
Cylindropuntia ramosissima is a decumbent or erect and treelike cactus which can approach 2 meters or 6 feet in maximum height. It has many narrow branches made up of cylindrical segments, green in color drying gray, the surface divided into squarish, flat tubercles with few or no spines, or often with a single long, straight spine.

The flower is small and orange, pink or brownish in color. The fruit is a small, dry, spiny body up to 2 centimeters long.

Cylindropuntia ramosissima is a host to several species of moths, most notably the Sphinx Moth
