= Rumatha jacumba =

Scientific classification
- Domain: Eukaryota
- Kingdom: Animalia
- Phylum: Arthropoda
- Class: Insecta
- Order: Lepidoptera
- Family: Pyralidae
- Genus: Rumatha
- Species: R. jacumba

Binomial name
- Rumatha jacumba Neunzig, 1997

Species of moth

Rumatha jacumba is a species of snout moth in the genus Rumatha. It was described by Herbert H. Neunzig in 1997. It is found in North America, including California and Nevada.
