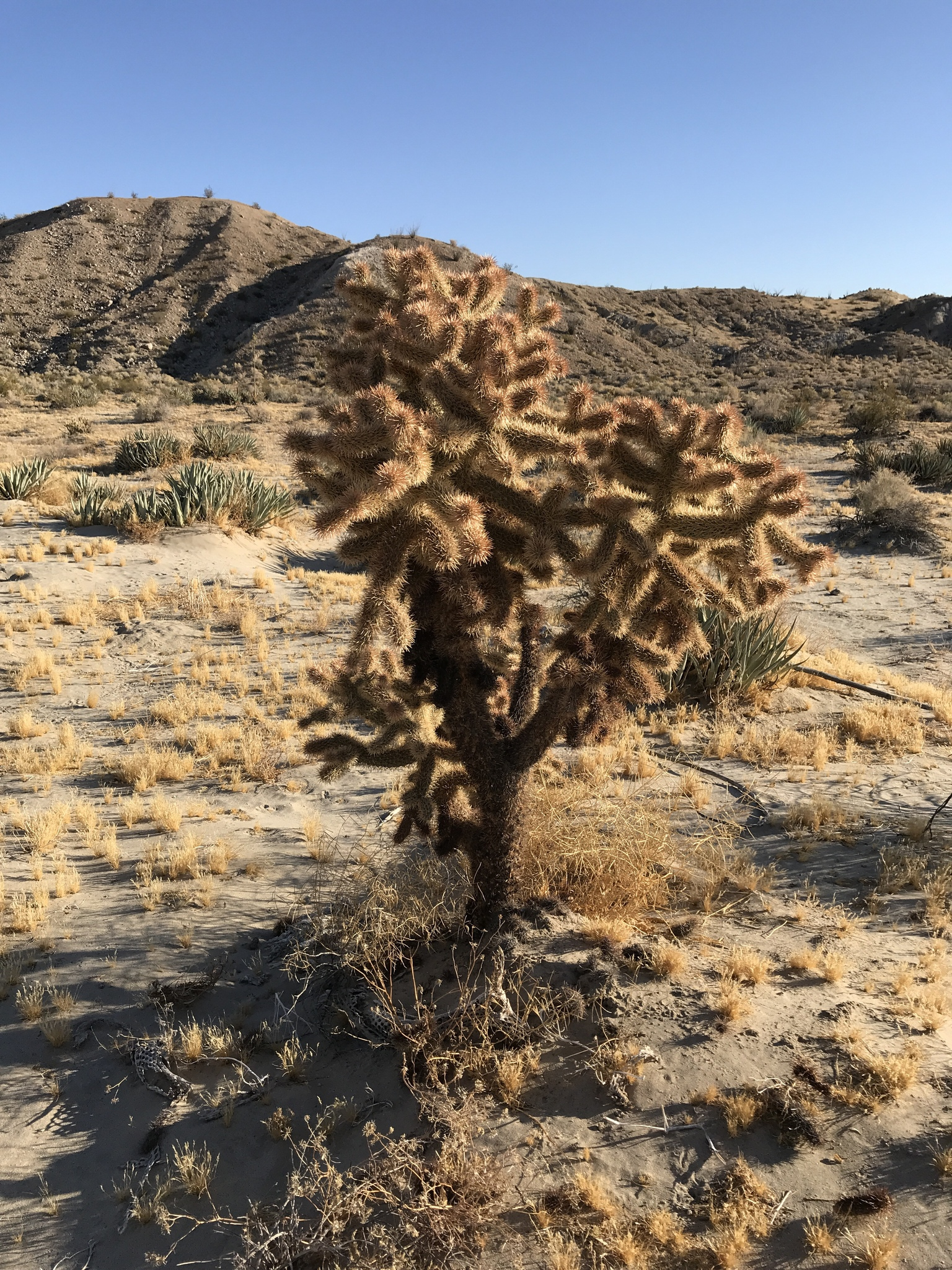

Conservation status
- Imperiled (NatureServe)

Scientific classification
- Kingdom: Plantae
- Clade: Tracheophytes
- Clade: Angiosperms
- Clade: Eudicots
- Order: Caryophyllales
- Family: Cactaceae
- Genus: Cylindropuntia
- Species: C. fosbergii

Binomial name
- Cylindropuntia fosbergii (C.B.Wolf) Rebman, M.A.Baker & Pinkava

Synonyms
- Opuntia fosbergii C.B.Wolf; Grusonia fosbergii (C.B.Wolf) G.D.Rowley; Opuntia bigelovii var. hoffmannii Fosberg

= Cylindropuntia fosbergii =

Species of plant

Cylindropuntia fosbergii is a species of cactus known by the common names Hoffmann's teddybear cholla, pink teddy-bear cholla, and Mason Valley cholla.

== Description ==
C. fosbergii is an herbaceous perennial stem with a blooming period between March and May. They are tree-like and can grow to 3 m tall. The stems are very easily detached. The joints are 4 to 18 cm long by 2 to 5.5 cm wide with dense pinkish spines. This, plus its overall resemblance to C. bigelovii gives it the common name "pink teddy bear cholla". However, the two are immediately distinguishable by the overall pinkish/orangish/reddish/brownish cast of C. fosbergii, compared to the whitish/silverish appearance of C. bigelovii. The flowers are pink to bronze with green filaments. The fruits are dry to leathery and generally sterile. C. fosbergii is triploid (3n = 33), hence its dependence on clonal reproduction. It is possible that, like C. bigelovii, it produces occasional diploid individuals, but this has not yet been shown. C. fosbergii has been described as a hybrid between C. bigelovii and C. echinocarpa, but neither morphological nor genetic studies support that hypothesis. Mayer et al. (2011) attempted to determine the parentage of C. fosbergii. None of the Cylindropuntia included in that study, other than C. bigelovii, appeared to be closely related to C. fosbergii. It is possible that C. fosbergii resulted from an ancient hybridization event with a now-extinct parent species or perhaps a Baja species such as C. alcahes that may have had a more widespread distribution in the past. Until further information is uncovered regarding C. fosbergii's possible hybrid origin, the Jepson Manual authors have decided to treat it as a good species in its own right.

== Distribution and habitat ==
It is endemic to south-eastern California where its range is restricted to the flats and hillsides of a very limited area in the region of Anza-Borrego Desert State Park in the western Sonoran Desert. This species typically grows at ranges of 85 to 850 meters.

== History ==
The origin of this species' epithet, then being classified under the genus Opuntia, was recorded by C.B. Wolf in 1938. "This plant described by Fosberg (Francis Raymond Fosberg) from Cane Brake Canyon, eastern San Diego County, California, is in our opinion a hybrid between O. Bigelovii and O. echinocarpa. However, the plant occupies an extensive area in the eastern San Diego County and certainly requires a name, but we feel that to continue to regard it as a variety of O. Bigelovii is not advisable, nor can it be raised to specific rank under the name of O. Hoffmannii, since that name has been used for a Mexican species. We, therefore, propose the name O. Fosbergii in honor of its discoverer."

== Conservation ==
Potentially threatened by development.
