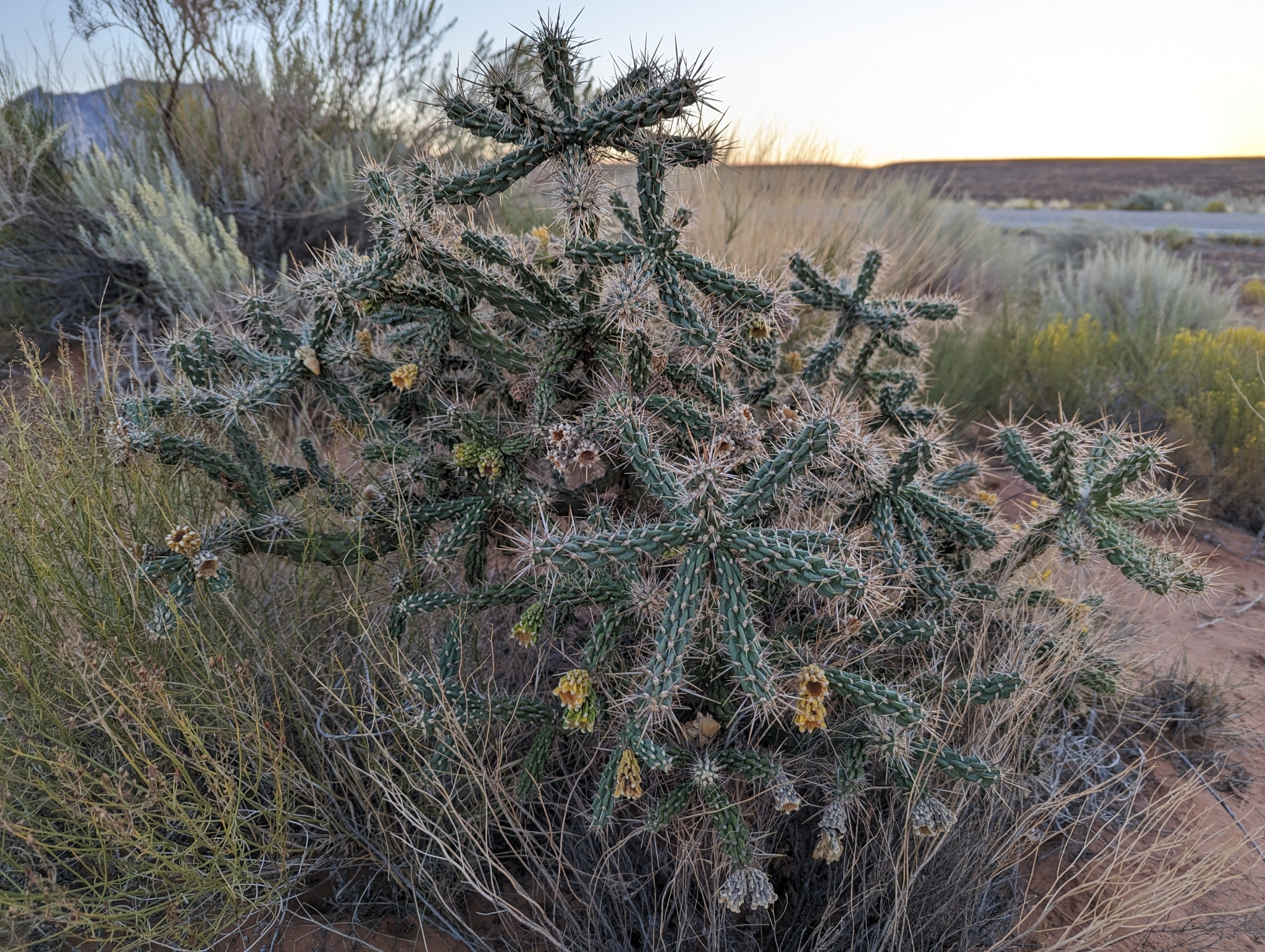

Conservation status
- Apparently Secure (NatureServe)

Scientific classification
- Kingdom: Plantae
- Clade: Tracheophytes
- Clade: Angiosperms
- Clade: Eudicots
- Order: Caryophyllales
- Family: Cactaceae
- Genus: Cylindropuntia
- Species: C. whipplei

Binomial name
- Cylindropuntia whipplei (Engelm. & J.M.Bigelow) F.M.Knuth

= Cylindropuntia whipplei =

Species of cactus

Cylindropuntia whipplei (formerly known as Opuntia whipplei, common name Whipple cholla) is a member of the cactus family, Cactaceae.

== Usage ==
The Zuni people rub the spines off the fruit and then dry them for winter use. The dried fruit is also ground into a flour, mixed with ground corn meal and made into a mush. Spineless fruits are eaten raw or stewed.
