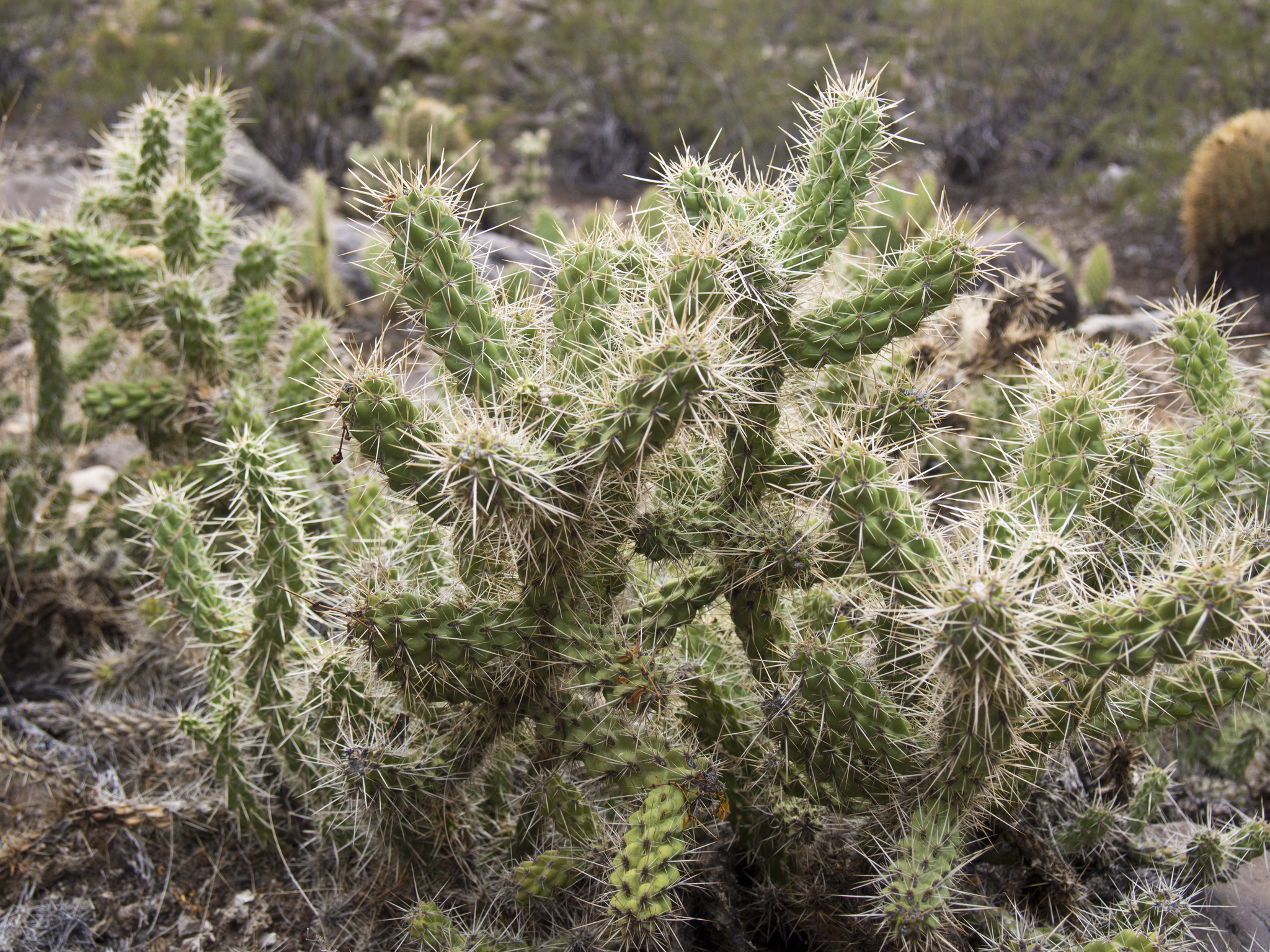

Scientific classification
- Kingdom: Plantae
- Clade: Tracheophytes
- Clade: Angiosperms
- Clade: Eudicots
- Order: Caryophyllales
- Family: Cactaceae
- Genus: Cylindropuntia
- Species: C. abyssi

Binomial name
- Cylindropuntia abyssi (Hester) Backeb.

Synonyms
- Grusonia abyssi (Hester) G.D.Rowley; Opuntia abyssi Hester

= Cylindropuntia abyssi =

Species of cactus

Cylindropuntia abyssi, common name Peach Springs cholla, is a species of cactus endemic to northwestern Arizona.

== Description ==
Cylindropuntia abyssi has branched stems up to 1 m (40 inches) tall. Stem segments are somewhat detachable, up to 14 cm (5.6 inches) long. Flowers are pale greenish-yellow. Fruits are dull yellow, dry, spineless or nearly so, with brown seeds.

== Distribution and habitat ==
It is known from only from the Grand Canyon and in Peach Springs Canyon, on the Hualapai Reservation in Mohave County. It grows in desert scrub on limestone ledges and hilltops. The natural range of the species is fairly small, but it is locally abundant and growing in an isolated area with few threats to the species survival.
