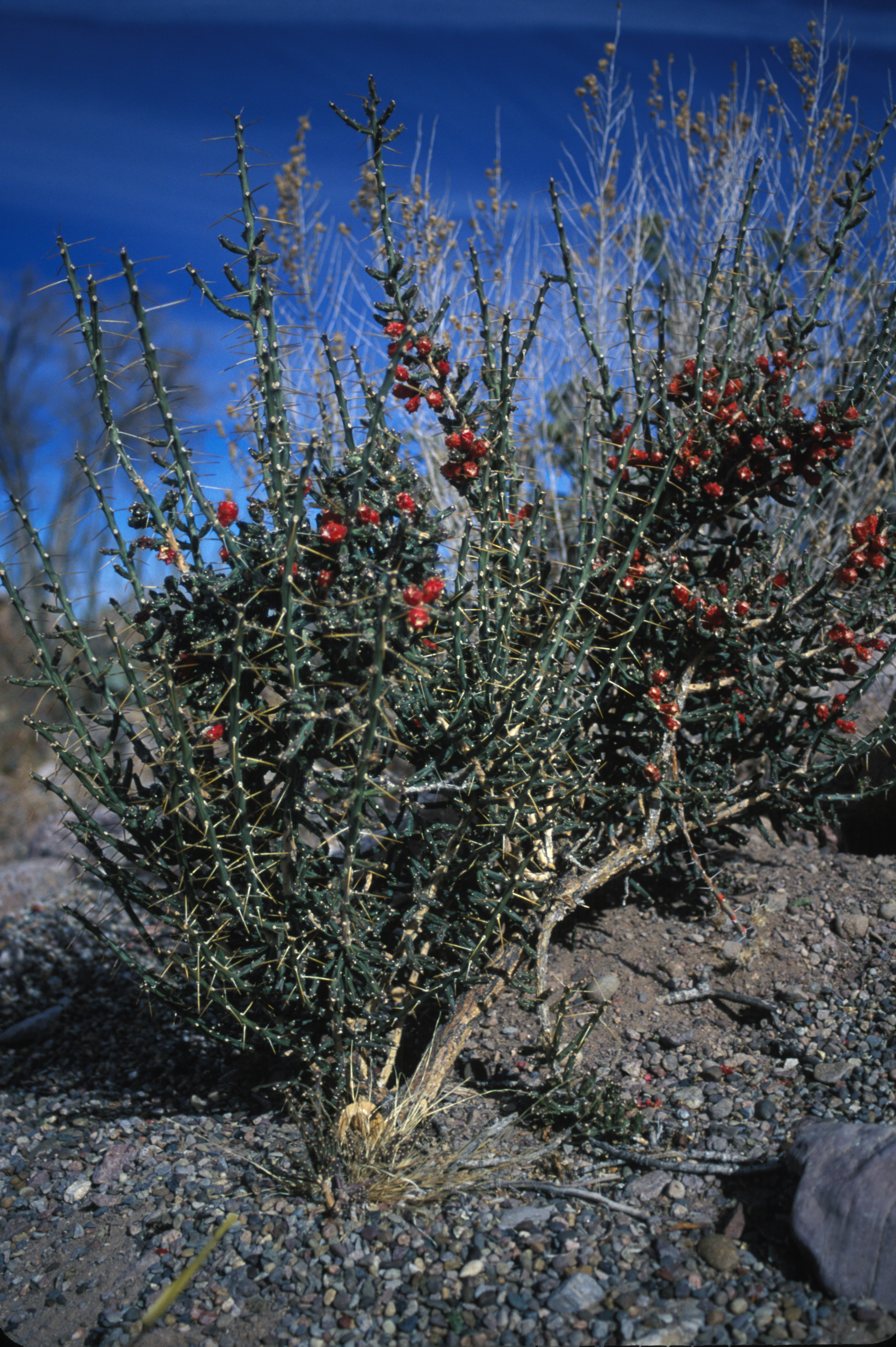

Scientific classification
- Kingdom: Plantae
- Clade: Embryophytes
- Clade: Tracheophytes
- Clade: Spermatophytes
- Clade: Angiosperms
- Clade: Eudicots
- Order: Caryophyllales
- Family: Cactaceae
- Genus: Cylindropuntia
- Species: C. leptocaulis

Binomial name
- Cylindropuntia leptocaulis F.M.Knuth

Synonyms
- Opuntia leptocaulis DC. Opuntia frutescens Engelm.

= Cylindropuntia leptocaulis =

Species of cactus

Cylindropuntia leptocaulis, the desert Christmas cactus, desert Christmas cholla, pencil cactus, or tasajillo, is a species of cholla cactus.

== Description ==
The shrubby Cylindropuntia leptocaulis plants reach 0.5 to 1.8 m (1.6 to 5.9 ft) tall, reaching the extreme height when supported within desert trees. Branches are narrow, 3–5 mm across. Spines 0-1 (occasionally as many as 3) at each areole. Flowers open in the late afternoon and are pale yellow or greenish yellow, with occasional red tips.

== Distribution and habitat ==
Cylindropuntia leptocaulis is widely distributed in deserts, grasslands, chaparral, and woodlands in the Southwestern United States (specifically, Arizona, New Mexico, Texas, and Oklahoma) and several states in Northern Mexico.

== Use ==
The fruits are crushed and mixed with a beverage by the Apache, Chiricahua, and Mescalero to produce narcotic effects.

== Gallery ==
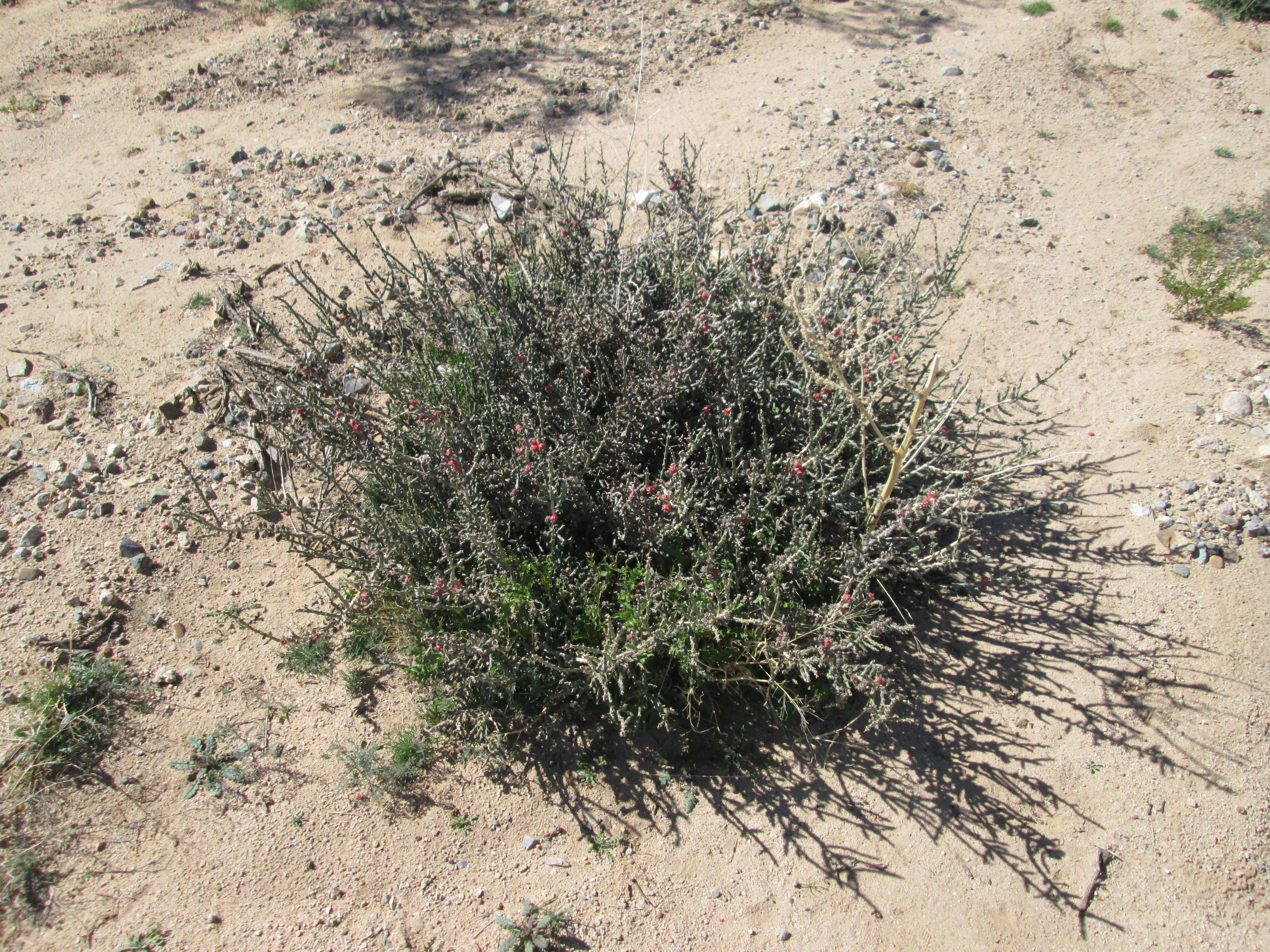
Desert Christmas Cactus in Sahuarita, Arizona.

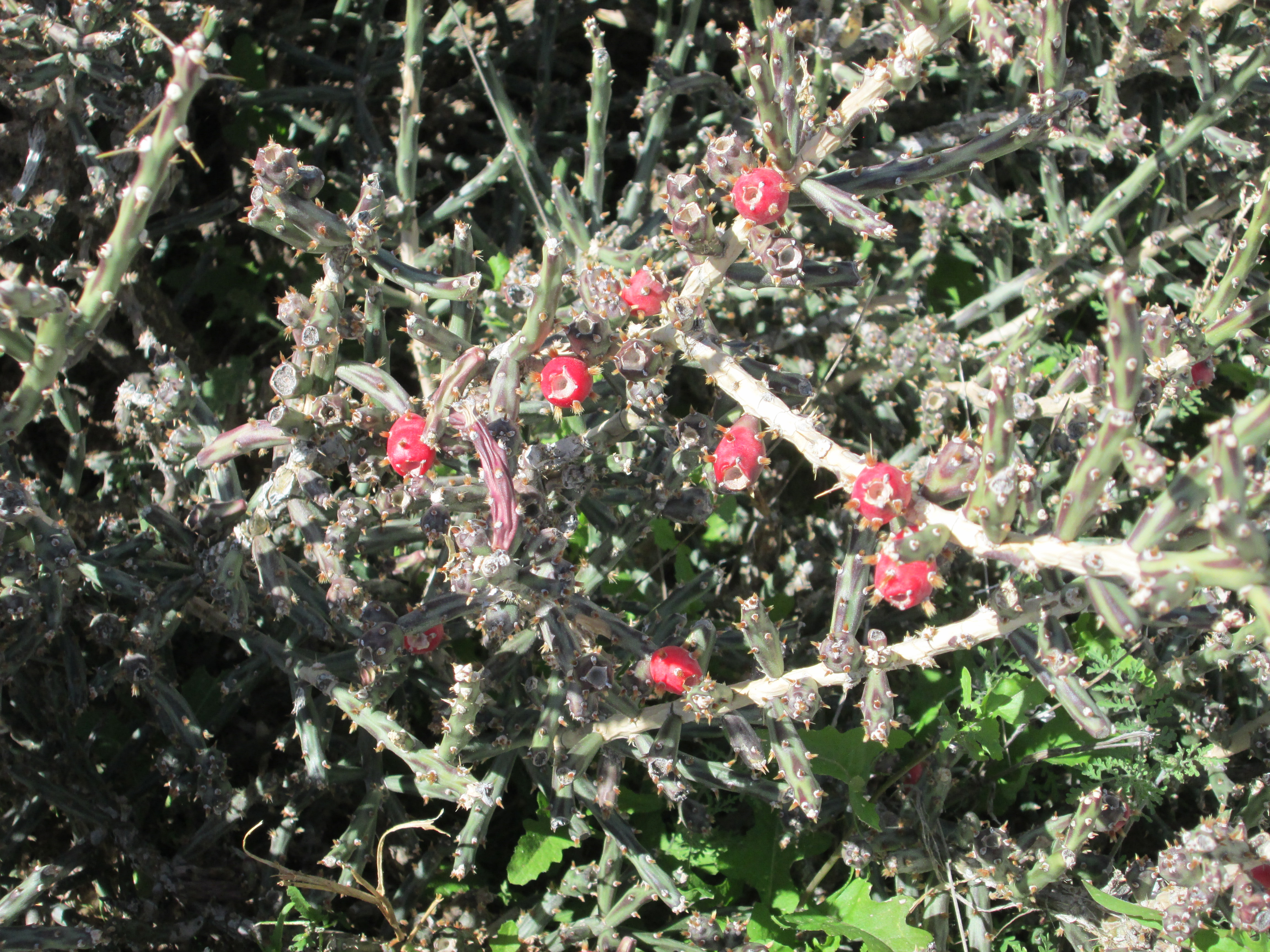
Desert Christmas Cactus fruit.
