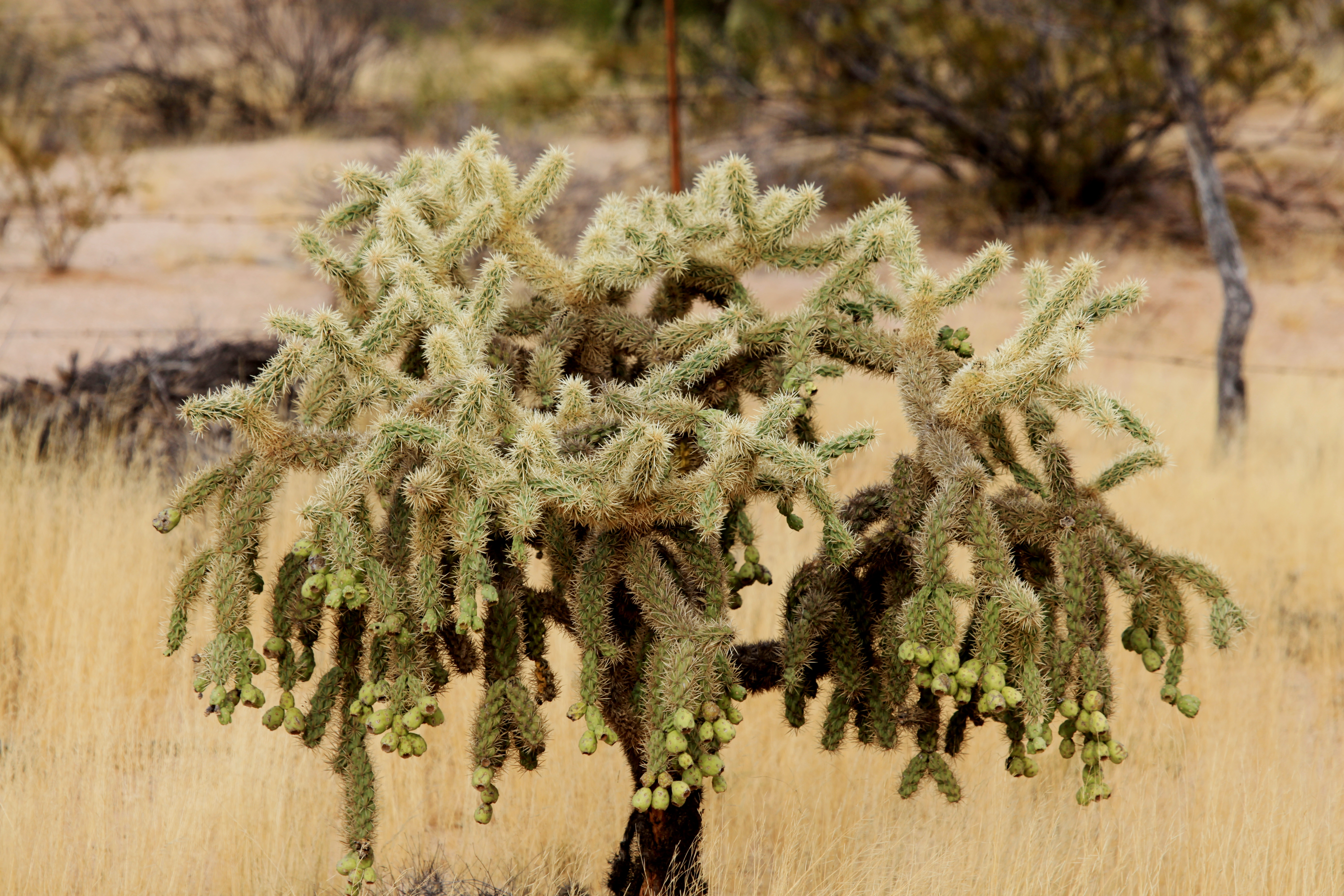

Scientific classification
- Kingdom: Plantae
- Clade: Tracheophytes
- Clade: Angiosperms
- Clade: Eudicots
- Order: Caryophyllales
- Family: Cactaceae
- Genus: Cylindropuntia
- Species: C. fulgida

Binomial name
- Cylindropuntia fulgida Engelm.
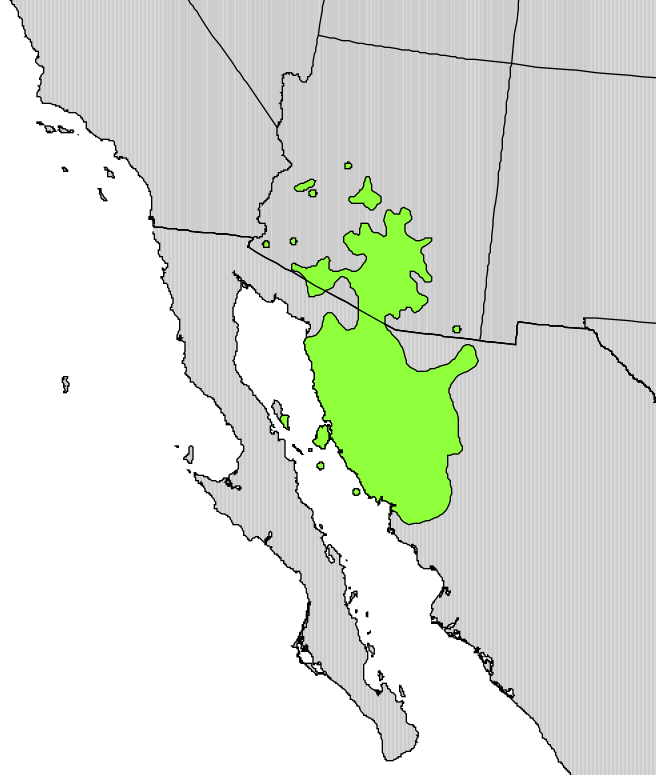
- Natural range

Synonyms
- Opuntia fulgida

= Cylindropuntia fulgida =

Species of cactus

Cylindropuntia fulgida, known as the jumping cholla or hanging chain cholla, is a cholla (Cylindropuntia) cactus native to Sinaloa and Sonora in Mexico, to as far as Arizona on the north in the Southwestern United States.

== Name ==
The species possesses many common names, though the most common one is "jumping cholla", which comes from the ease with which the stems detach from the main plant when brushed, "jumping" onto passing animals. While the name "jumping cholla" is applied especially to this species, it is also used as a general term for all chollas.

== Description ==
The jumping cholla is an arborescent (tree-like) plant with one low-branching trunk. It often grows to heights of 4 m (13 feet), with drooping branches of chained fruit. The stems are light green and are strongly tuberculate, with tubercles (small, wart-like projections on the stems) measuring 6 to 9 millimetres (1/4 to 1/3 in). Together, the plants form forests that may range over many hectares.

Flowers are white and pink, streaked with lavender, and are roughly 2.5 cm (1 inch) wide. The flowers are displayed at the joint tips (or old fruit tips), blooming in mid-summer. According to naturalists/writers Henry and Rebecca Northen, a curiosity of these flowers is that C. fulgida opens its flowers at exactly 3:00 p.m. solar time, and can be used to set one's watch.

Most of the fleshy, green fruits are sterile, pear-shaped to nearly round, wrinkled with a few spines. They are typically about 4 cm (1 1/2 inches) long, often producing flowers the following year which add new fruits to those of previous seasons. It is these hanging chains of fruit which give it the name "hanging chain cholla".

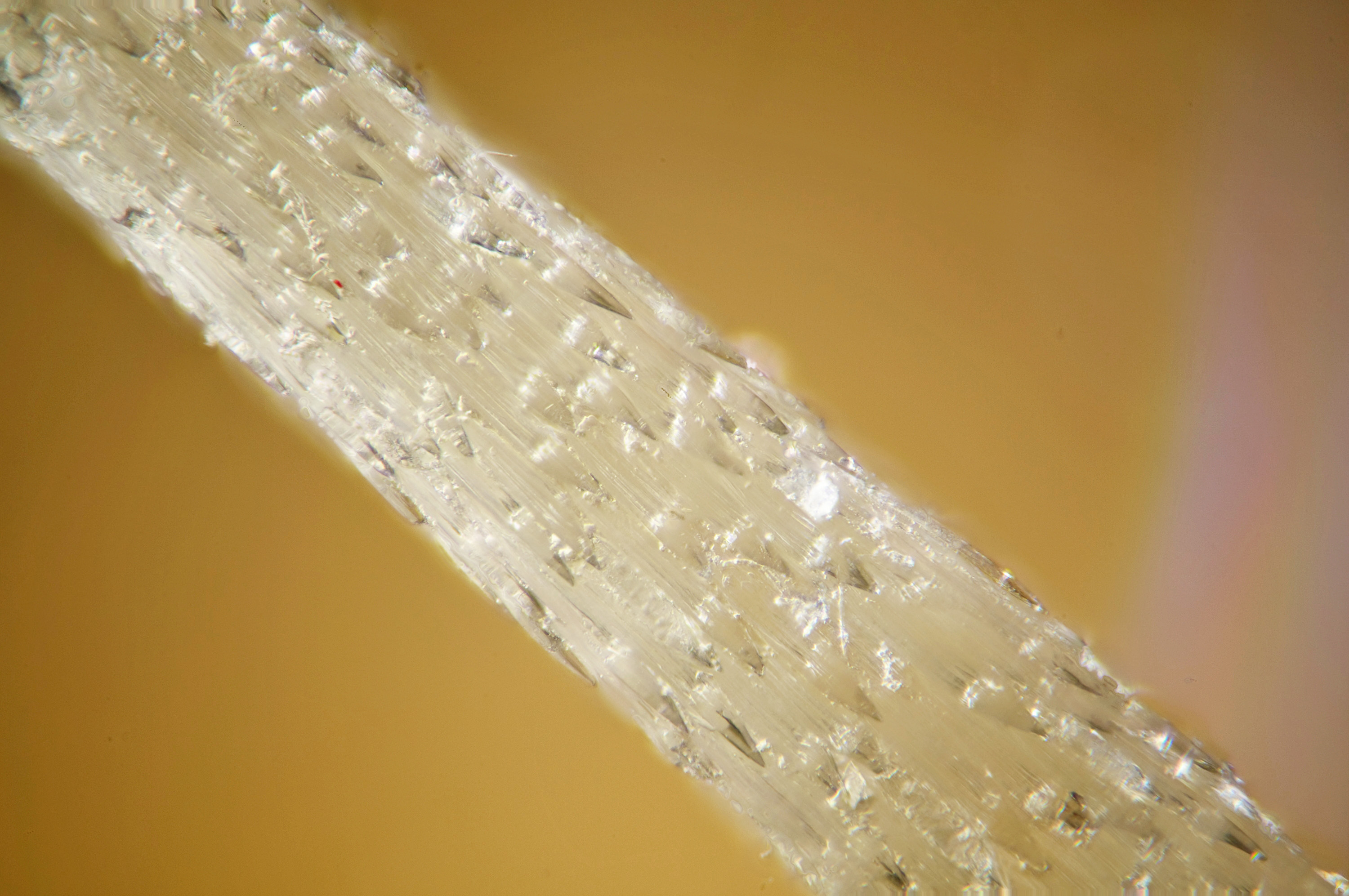
Closeup image of a cholla spine showing microscopic barbs which make removal extremely painful.

Like other cacti, the plant's leaves have been reduced to spines, 6 to 12 of which grow from each areole. Young branches are covered with 2 to 3 cm (3/4 to 1 1/6 inches) silvery-yellow spines, which darken to a gray color with age. These spines form a dense layer that obscures the stems. Slower growing or older branches have sparse and/or shorter spines. As the spines fall off of older parts, the brown-black bark is revealed. It becomes rough and scaly with age.

== Distribution and habitat ==
In the Southwestern United States, the range extends into the Colorado Desert of California, and in Arizona. There it occurs south and southwest of the Arizona transition zone of the Mogollon Rim; in the northwest-central Sonoran Desert of Arizona, it is in a few selected locales. It also reaches into the northeast section of the Mojave Desert in southern Nevada and Utah, and in the very southern section of the Great Basin Desert of southern Utah. It also occurs just south of the east-west section of the Bill Williams River, east of the Colorado River in the Yuma Desert, and in parts of the Eastern Plains of Colorado.

Cylindropuntia fulgida grows at elevations ranging from 300 to 1,000 m (980 to 3,280 feet).

== Ecology ==
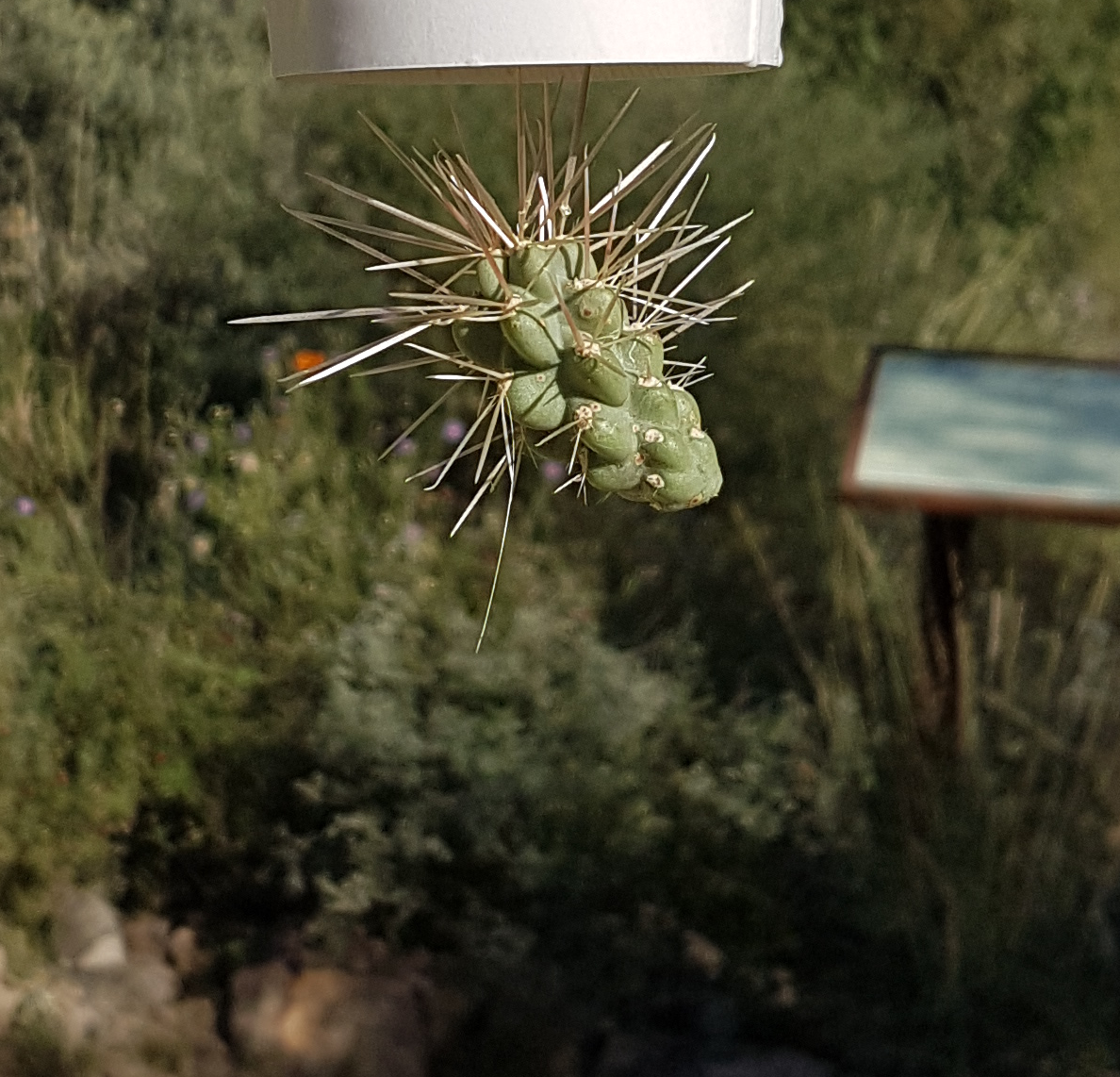
Jumping Cholla's stem detached and latched on the base of a paper cup.

The ground around a mature plant will often be covered with dead stems, and young plants are started from stems that have fallen from the adult, and the merest touch will often leave a person with bits of cactus hanging on their clothes to be discovered later when either sitting or leaning on them. Typically, they attach themselves to desert animals and are dispersed for short distances; extinct hairy megafauna that lived in the last ice age may have played a role in their historic, more widespread dispersal in this manner.

During droughts, animals like the bighorn sheep and some deer species like the desert mule deer, rely on the plant's fruit for food and water. Because they grow in inaccessible and hostile places of the desert, populations of this cactus are stable. Cactus wren are also known to nest in jumping cholla.
