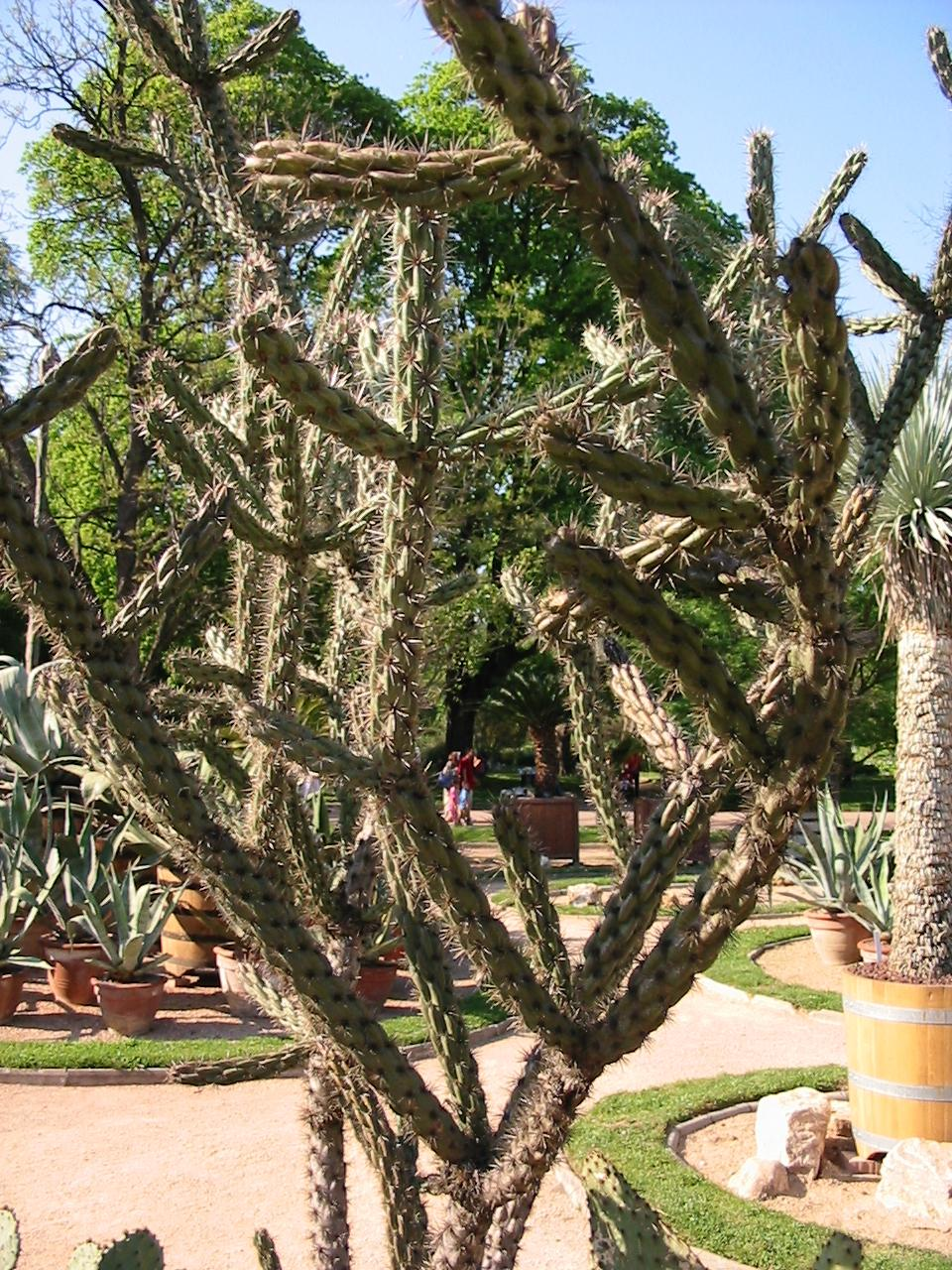
- Cylindropuntia kleiniae

Scientific classification
- Kingdom: Plantae
- Clade: Tracheophytes
- Clade: Angiosperms
- Clade: Eudicots
- Order: Caryophyllales
- Family: Cactaceae
- Subfamily: Opuntioideae
- Tribe: Cylindropuntieae
- Genus: Cylindropuntia (Engelm.) F.M.Knuth

Species
- See text

Synonyms
- Opuntia (Cylindropuntia) Engelm.; Grusonia (Cylindropuntia) (Engelm.) G.D.Rowley

= Cylindropuntia =

Cholla

Genus of cacti

Cylindropuntia is a genus of cacti (family Cactaceae), containing species commonly known as chollas (/ˈtʃɔɪəz/ CHOY-əz), native to northern Mexico and the Southwestern United States. They are known for their barbed spines that tenaciously attach to skin, fur, and clothing. Stands of cholla are called cholla gardens. Individuals within these colonies often exhibit the same DNA, as they were formerly tubercles of an original plant.

== Taxonomy ==
Cylindropuntia was formerly treated as a subgenus of Opuntia, but have now been separated based on their cylindrical stems (Opuntia species have flattened stems) and the presence of papery epidermal sheaths on the spines (Opuntia has no sheaths). A few species of mat- or clump-forming opuntioid cacti are currently placed in the genus Grusonia. Collectively, opuntias, chollas, and related plants are called opuntiads.

Roughly 35 species of Cylindropuntia are native to the southwestern and south-central United States, Mexico, and the West Indies. The Flora of North America recognizes 22 species. Some species have been introduced to South America (Chile, Ecuador, Peru) and South Africa.

=== Species ===
As of September 2026, Plants of the World Online accepts the following species:

Scientific name	Common name	Picture
Cylindropuntia abyssi (Hester) Backeb.	Peach Springs Cholla	
Cylindropuntia acanthocarpa Engelm. & J.M. Bigelow	Buckhorn Cholla	
Cylindropuntia alcahes (F.A.C. Weber) F.M. Knuth	Clavellina Cholla	
Cylindropuntia anteojoensis (Pinkava) E.F. Anderson		
Cylindropuntia arbuscula (Engelm.) F.M. Knuth	Arizona Pencil Cholla	
Cylindropuntia bernardina (Engelm. ex Parish) M.A.Baker, Cloud-H. & Rebman	Cane Cholla	
Cylindropuntia bigelovii (Engelm.) F.M.Knuth	Teddybear Cholla	
Cylindropuntia californica (Torr. & A.Gray) F.M.Knuth	California Cholla	
Cylindropuntia calmalliana (J.M.Coult.) F.M.Knuth		
Cylindropuntia caribaea (Britton & Rose) F.M. Knuth		
Cylindropuntia cedrosensis Rebman		
Cylindropuntia cholla (F.A.C. Weber) F.M. Knuth	Chainlink Cholla	
Cylindropuntia chuckwallensis M.A.Baker & Cloud-H.		
Cylindropuntia ciribe (Engelm. ex J.M.Coult.) F.M.Knuth		
Cylindropuntia davisii (Engelm. & J.M. Bigelow) F.M. Knuth		
Cylindropuntia densiaculeata Backeb.		
Cylindropuntia echinocarpa (Engelm. & Bigelow) F.M.Knuth	Silver Cholla	
Cylindropuntia fosbergii (C.B. Wolf) Rebman, M.A. Baker & Pinkava	Hoffmann's Teddybear Cholla	
Cylindropuntia fulgida Engelm.	Jumping Cholla	
Cylindropuntia ganderi (C.B. Wolf) Rebman & Pinkav	Gander Cholla	
Cylindropuntia hystrix (Griseb.) Areces		
Cylindropuntia imbricata Haw. (DC.)	Cane Cholla	
Cylindropuntia kleiniae (DC.) F.M. Knuth		
Cylindropuntia leptocaulis F.M.Knuth	Desert Christmas Cholla	
Cylindropuntia libertadensis Rebman		
Cylindropuntia lindsayi (Rebman) Rebman		
Cylindropuntia molesta (Brandegee) F.M.Knuth	Agujilla	
Cylindropuntia multigeniculata (Clokey) Backeb.		
Cylindropuntia munzii (C.B. Wolf) Backeb.		
Cylindropuntia pallida (Rose) F.M.Knuth		
Cylindropuntia perrita (Griffiths) Majure		
Cylindropuntia prolifera (Engelm.) F.M.Knuth	Coastal Cholla	
Cylindropuntia ramosissima (Engelm.) F.M.Knuth	Branched Pencil Cholla	
Cylindropuntia sanfelipensis (Rebman) Rebman		
Cylindropuntia santamaria (E.M. Baxter) Rebman		
Cylindropuntia tesajo (Engelm. ex J.M. Coult.) F.M. Knuth		
Cylindropuntia thurberi (Engelm.) F.M. Knuth		
Cylindropuntia tunicata (Lehm.) F.M.Knuth	Sheathed Cholla	
Cylindropuntia waltoniorum Rebman		
Cylindropuntia whipplei (Engelm. & J.M.Bigelow) F.M.Knuth	Rat-tail Cholla	
Cylindropuntia wolfii (L.D. Benson) J. Rebman – unplaced name	Wolf's Cholla	

=== Hybrids ===
Some hybrids are also known:

- Cylindropuntia × antoniae P.V.Heath
- Cylindropuntia × campii (M.A.Baker & Pinkava) M.A.Baker & Pinkava
- Cylindropuntia × cardenche (Griffiths) F.M.Knuth
- Cylindropuntia × congesta (Griffiths) F.M.Knuth
- Cylindropuntia × deserta (Griffiths) Pinkava
- Cylindropuntia × grantiorum P.V.Heath
- Cylindropuntia × kelvinensis (V.E.Grant & K.A.Grant) P.V.Heath
- Cylindropuntia × neoarbuscula (Griffiths) F.M.Knuth
- Cylindropuntia × pallida (Rose) F.M.Knuth
- Cylindropuntia × tetracantha (Toumey) F.M.Knuth
- Cylindropuntia × viridiflora (Britton & Rose) F.M.Knuth
- Cylindropuntia × vivipara (Rose) F.M.Knuth

== Cholla wood in pet trade ==
Dried, dead Cylindropuntia sections are called "cholla wood" and are popular in the pet trade. In aquariums they are immersed partly or entirely into the water for pets to swim through, and in terrariums and other terrestrial pet enclosures they are placed and propped up for climbing.
