= Frederik Marcus Knuth (taxonomist) =

Danish taxonomist (1904–1970)

Frederik Marcus Knuth, 9th Count of Knuthenborg (5 May 1904 – 14 June 1970) was a Danish taxonomist especially known for the collection and classification of cactuses. He collected and described many new species.

According to the Bovrup File Knuth was a member of DNSAP.
