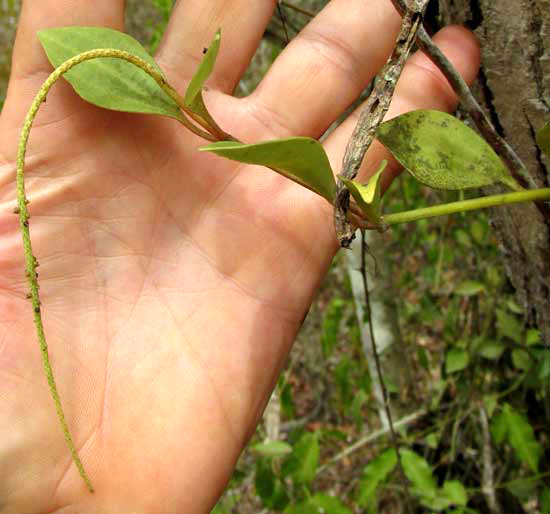
- Leafy stem with flowering spike

Scientific classification
- Kingdom: Plantae
- Clade: Tracheophytes
- Clade: Angiosperms
- Clade: Magnoliids
- Order: Piperales
- Family: Piperaceae
- Genus: Peperomia
- Species: P. angustata

Binomial name
- Peperomia angustata Kunth

Synonyms
- List: Piper angustatum (Kunth) Poir.; Peperomia angustata var. santamartae C.DC.; Peperomia crassiuscula Millsp.; Peperomia friabilis Trel.; Peperomia glutinosa Millsp.; Peperomia longespicata C.DC.; Peperomia lundellii Trel.; Peperomia quicheensis Trel.; Peperomia rhodophlebia Trel.; Peperomia sarcocarpa Trel.; Peperomia victoriana C.DC.; Peperomia victoriana var. margaritana C.DC.; Peperomia viridispica Trel.; Peperomia viridispica var. perejil Trel.; Peperomia wagneri Trel.

= Peperomia angustata =

Species of plant

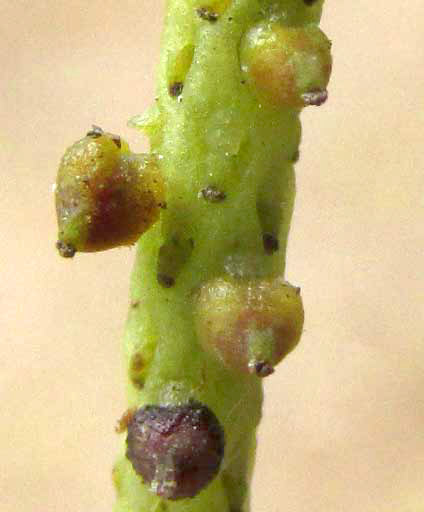
Close-up of maturing peppercorns

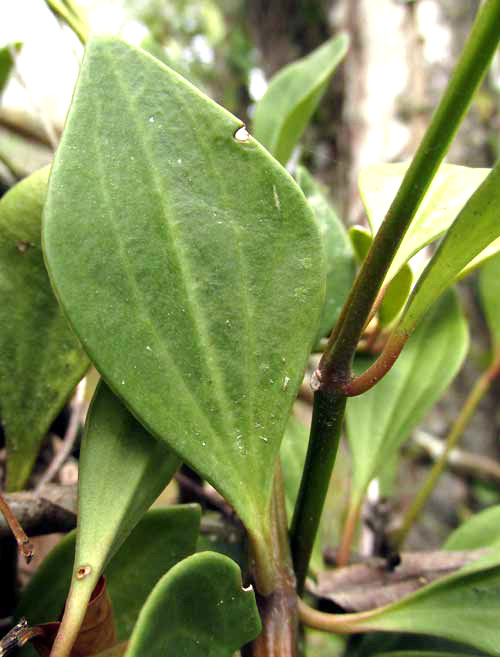
Leaf with 3 main veins

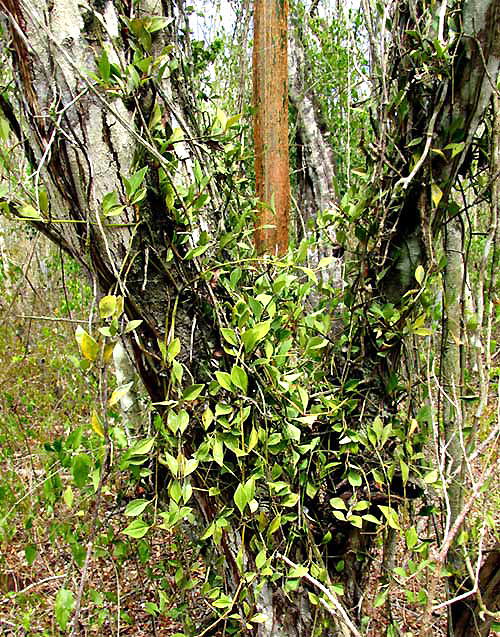
In habitat

Peperomia angustata, with no commonly used English name, is a species of epiphyte or lithophyte native to the Neotropical realm. It belongs to the family Piperaceae.

== Description ==
Peperomia angustata, common over much of its distribution area, is a perennial plant species which is herbaceous with succulent leaves, and which climbs in trees or trails on the ground. Here are other notable features:

- Branching stems reach about 30 cm (12 in) long and tend to be 6-angled. Leaves arise in groups of 3-6 with petioles up to 70 mm (3 in) long and blades generally rhombic in shape up to 5 cm (2 in) long and about half as wide. Blades have 3-5 nerves radiating from the base.
- Inflorescences are single spikes at branch tips, with peduncles up to 3 cm (1 in) long and the flowering part up to 30 cm (12 in) long, but only up to about 2 mm (1/8 in) wide. The flowering part is covered with tiny scale-like bracts, each associated with a flower.
- As in all species of the family, the flowers are very small and much simplified, with no sepals and no corolla, but with two stamens and an ovary.
- Egg-shaped, one-seeded, drupe-type fruits commonly known a peppercorns are up to 1.4 mm (1/16 in) high and a little less wide, thus too small to grind as a spice. When mature they are dark brown to black.

== Distribution ==
Peperomia angustata is native to Mexico, Central America and South America south to Peru and northern Brazil. Older records also may place it in Cuba.

== Habitat ==
In Mexico's Yucatan Peninsula Peperomia angustata occurs in dry forests with deciduous leaves. In Mexico's Eastern Sierra Madre foothills it also occurs in tropical semi-deciduous forests below 500 m (1,600 ft) in elevation. In Los Llanos Region, Venezuela, it inhabits tropical deciduous forests, forests along rivers and scrubland.

== In traditional medicine ==
In the Mexican state of Veracruz, Peperomia angustata is used to treat rheumatism and earache. Among the Mayan people of Mexico's Yucatan Peninsula, in the Otoch Ma´ax yetel Kooh preserved area, Peperomia angustata is employed to treat snakebite and bites and stings of other venomous animals, such as scorpions and spiders.

== Taxonomy ==
Peperomia angustata is one of many species first scientifically collected by Alexander von Humboldt and Aimé Bonpland during their American Expedition of 1799–1804, and who later, in 1816, with the help of Carl Sigismund Kunth, formally published the taxon name and description. The type specimen had been collected at the explorers' first base of operations, in the environs of Cumaná, Venezuela, which they visited in 1799 and 1800.

=== Etymology ===
The genus name Peperomia is New Latin from the Greek peperi meaning "pepper", and homoios meaning "like, similar." This alludes to species of Peperomia being similar to species of the pepper genus Piper.

The species name angustata is a conjugated form from the Latin angusto meaning "narrowed." When Kunth formally described the species in Latin, he remarked that the leaves had narrow bases, "... basi angustatis."
