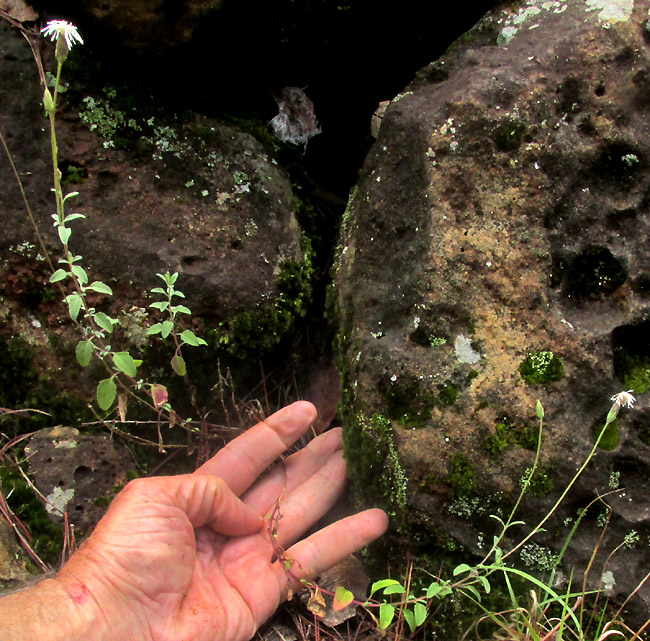
- Brickellia pedunculosa in habitat

Scientific classification
- Kingdom: Plantae
- Clade: Embryophytes
- Clade: Tracheophytes
- Clade: Spermatophytes
- Clade: Angiosperms
- Clade: Eudicots
- Clade: Asterids
- Order: Asterales
- Family: Asteraceae
- Genus: Brickellia
- Species: B. pedunculosa

Binomial name
- Brickellia pedunculosa (DC.) Harc. & Beaman

Synonyms
- Bulbostylis pedunculosa DC.; Eupatorium pedunculosum DC.) A.Gray; Phanerostylis pedunculosa (DC.) R.M.King & H.Rob.; Eupatorium longipes A.Gray

= Brickellia pedunculosa =

Species of plant

Brickellia pedunculosa, with no commonly used English name, is a species of herbaceous plant native only to Mexico. It belongs to the family Asteraceae.

== Discription ==
Here are distinctive field marks of Brickellia pedunculosa:

- Several slender, hairy stems arise from thickened, woody caudices which are up to 50 cm (20 in) long and tend to bend outward. Stems are little branched above their bases.
- Leaves with short, reddish petioles arise either singly or in pairs along stems. Thickish blades to about 1.5 cm (5/8 in) long and 7 mm (1/4 in) wide usually are broadest below their middles and have margins which may or may not develop one or two teeth on each side. The blades' upper and lower surfaces are a little hairy and bear abundant, very small resinous globules. Usually smaller secondary leaves arise at the bases of the main leaves.
- Floral heads about 1.5 cm (5/8 in) tall and up 1 cm (3/8 in) wide contain about 30-40 "disc florets" with white, cylindrical corollas approximately 9 mm (3/8 in) long. As images on this page show, two slender, somewhat flattened, white style branches may emerge from corollas attracting more attention than the corollas themselves. Below the florets, 5–7 series of involucral bracts of different heights are green with reddish hues and each bears 2-4 prominent nerves.
- One-seeded, cypsela-type fruits about 6 mm (1/4 in) long are topped with pappuses consisting of white bristles nearly as long as the corollas.

== Distribution ==
Brickellia pedunculosa is endemic to Mexico, from the northern states of Durango, Coahuila, Nuevo León and Tamaulipas south into the states of Michoacán, México and Veracruz.

== Habitat ==
In highland central Mexico Brickellia pedunculosa occurs in forests with oaks and pines at elevations of 2,600–2,900 m (8,500–9,500 ft).

== Taxonomy ==
In 1836 when Augustin Pyrame de Candolle formally described Brickellia pedunculosa using the basionym Bulbostylis pedunculosa, he remarked that his type specimen came from near "Villapando" in Mexico. De Candolle collaborated with Alexander von Humboldt, who with other scientists shared specimens collected on his exploratory American Expedition of 1799-1804. It is known that Humboldt collected plants "between Moran and Villalpando" (not de Candolle's "Villapando"), in the Mexican state of Guanajuato, at an elevation of 2,340–2,520 m (7,680–8,270 ft).

=== Phylogeny ===
On the basis of morphology and chromosome number (n=9), Brickellia pedunculosa appears to be a relatively primitive member of the genus. The species's chromosomes are the largest of the genus, in phylogenetics a trait regarded as primitive.

=== Etymology ===
The genus name Brickellia honors John Brickell (1748–1809), an Irish-born physician and naturalist who settled in the USA.

The species name pedunculosa derives from the Latin pedunculosus meaning "bearing a peduncle", of which Brickellia pedunculosa can produce some long ones.

== Gallery ==
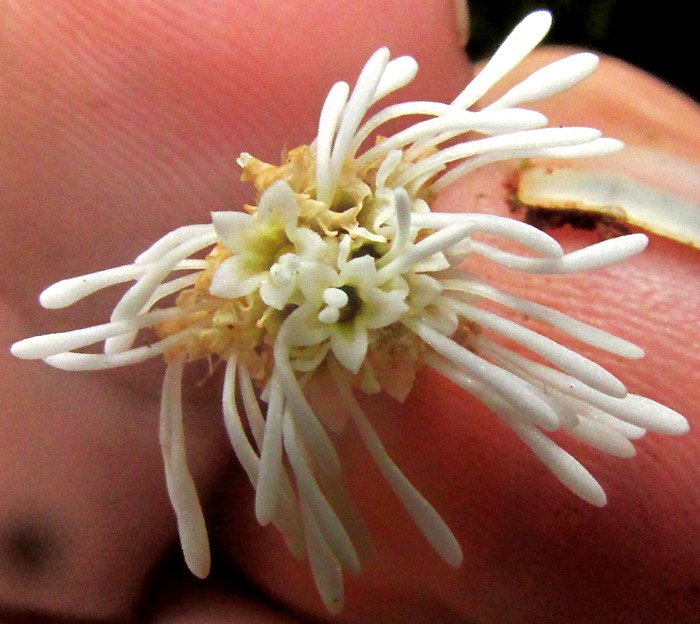
Conspicuous style branches emerging from florets

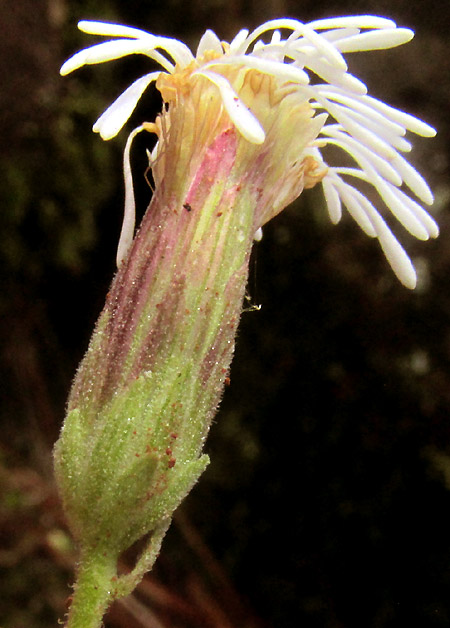
Involucral bracts

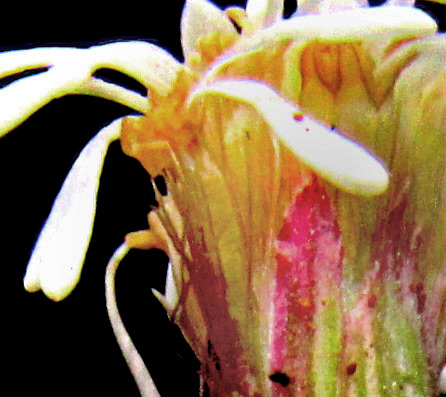
White bristles of pappuses seen between bracts

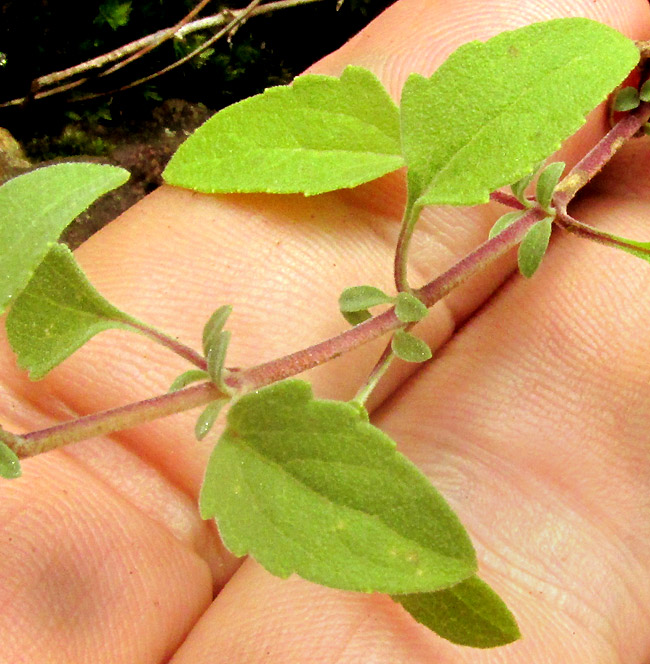
Pairs of leaves with secondary leaves

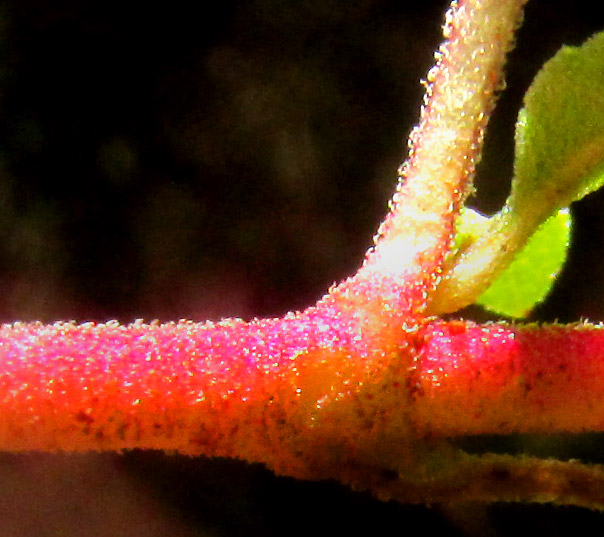
Hairy stem and petiole
