= American Expedition 1799–1804 =

The American Expedition (1799–1804) was a scientific exploration of Spanish America conducted by the Prussian naturalist Alexander von Humboldt and the French botanist Aimé Bonpland. Over the course of five years, the expedition traversed across present-day Venezuela, Colombia, Ecuador, Peru, Cuba, Mexico, and parts of the United States. Humboldt and Bonpland conducted pioneering research in fields including geography, biology, geology, meteorology, and ethnography.

They observed and described vast regions of South and Central America, mapping rivers like the Orinoco and investigating the Andes Mountains—including an attempt to climb Chimborazo, accompanied by local savants and informants. Their observations of plant and animal life, atmospheric phenomena, and indigenous cultures - influenced by the debates ongoing in Spanish American in those years - laid the foundations for modern biogeography and ecology.

== Background ==
By the mid-1790s, Humboldt had devoted himself wholly to scientific investigations. Despite being offered a promotion and an increase in pay, he resigned his position as a mining official in the Prussian civil service in order to embark on a journey that would “advance him scientifically.” To the Minister of Mines in Berlin Humboldt declared: "I am considering a complete change in my mode of life, and I intend to withdraw from any official position with the state." His health, he claimed, had suffered. All he had wanted was to prepare himself for a scientific expedition by a practical employment in the mines. "As I have a deep conviction that such an expedition is highly important for increasing our knowledge of geology and physical science, I am exceedingly eager to devote my energies immediately to this end.

After his mother's death in 1796, Humboldt inherited the financial means to pursue independent explorations. He decided to go to Italy, where he wanted to spend a year to a year and a half researching volcanoes. From there, he wanted to travel via Paris to England, where he would board a ship to the West Indies. However, the political instability caused by Napoleon's Italian campaign in 1797 forced Humboldt to cancel his plans. In May 1798, Humboldt traveled to Paris, where he met the botanist Aimé Bonpland. After their attempt to travel to Egypt had once again failed due to Napoleon and his campaign there, the two decided to go to Madrid in December 1798.

== Arrival in Spain ==
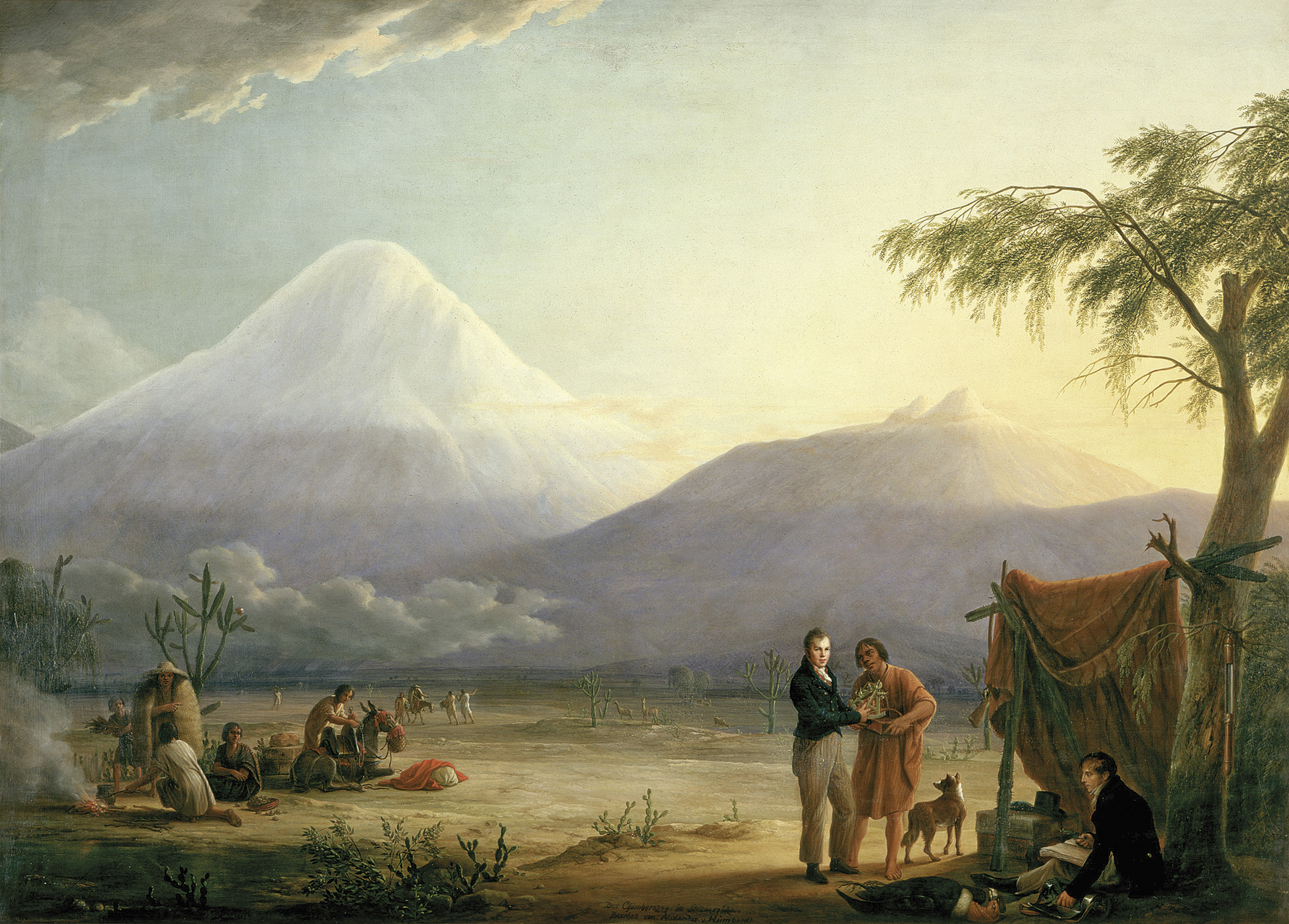
Humboldt and his fellow scientist Aimé Bonpland near the foot of the Chimborazo volcano, painting by Friedrich Georg Weitsch (1810)

In Madrid, Alexander von Humboldt pursued the idea of a scientific expedition to Spanish America, despite the usual restrictions on foreign travel in Spanish colonies. Through the assistance of Don Mariano Luis de Urquijo, Spain’s First Secretary of State, whom Humboldt had previously met in London, he was introduced to King Charles IV of Spain. The king granted Humboldt and his companion, Aimé Bonpland, official permission to travel throughout Spanish America for scientific purposes. The royal passports granted Humboldt and Bonpland extensive rights, including the use of scientific instruments, freedom of movement, and the authority to conduct research throughout Spanish territories.

Colonial officials were instructed to assist them as needed. Such privileges were exceptional, given that Spain had historically allowed very few foreign scientific missions in its colonies, due to longstanding policies of restricting access to outsiders for reasons of state security, economic monopoly, and religious protection. The level of trust and freedom granted to Humboldt was unprecedented for a non-Spaniard. Humboldt recognized that Spain’s primary interest in granting permission was related to his expertise in mineralogy and the potential for discovering new mineral resources, rather than purely scientific advancement.

== Preparations and Objectives of the Expedition ==
Expedition route

During the months of preparation, they stocked up on literature, reviewed all natural history collections, visited experts and purchased scientific instruments which consisted of sextants and quadrants, balances and compasses, telescopes and microscopes, hygrometers and barometers, cyanometers, eudiometers, thermometers, chronometers, magnetometers, a Leyden jar and a Lunette d’ épreuve (a “proof-glass”, a deep cylindrical glass for holding liquids while under test). Humboldt and Bonpland set off from Madrid in mid-May 1799 for La Coruña in northwestern Spain, where they were to embark on the Corvette Pizzaro. Along the route, they made astronomical position determinations and altimetric measurements as normal, which might be utilized to enhance the maps of Spain.

The objectives of his expedition to America were primarily scientific in nature. Humboldt sought to systematically investigate the physical and natural features of the American continent, including its geography, climate, flora, and fauna. He aimed to carry out precise measurements of altitude, temperature, and magnetic phenomena, and to collect data on the distribution of plants and animals in relation to environmental factors. He was interested in understanding the interconnections between the earth’s physical conditions and living organisms, an approach he later described as tracing the “unity of nature.”Since he had to pay for the expedition himself, he needed sufficient capital. With the help of Jewish friends of the Humboldts, the Mendelson and Friedländer bank agreed to transfer any desired sum to Madrid without collateral or guarantees.

== The Journey to South America ==
On 5 June 1799, the Pizarro departed from the port of La Coruña after a period of delay caused by unfavorable weather. The ship, commanded by Captain Cagigal, left in the early afternoon and encountered difficulties navigating the harbor due to contrary winds, nearly running aground before eventually clearing the port. The vessel passed Castle San Antonio and the Tower of Hercules by the evening, then altered its course to avoid a British naval squadron operating offshore, a precaution necessitated by ongoing hostilities and blockades associated with the European wars of the period. Spain, originally allied with Britain and other monarchies against revolutionary France, had made peace with France in 1795. If the Pizarro had been captured at sea, the ship would likely have been taken to Portugal, a British ally, resulting in the loss of passage for the expedition’s civilian passengers to the New World.

During the voyage, Humboldt and Bonpland initiated scientific work, including the use of a dip needle to measure the Earth’s magnetic inclination and water-temperature readings, confirming previous observations by Franklin and Williams regarding ocean temperatures. The Pizarro sailed past Cape Finisterre and, on 8 June 1799, encountered an English squadron along the coast, prompting a change in course. The ship continued past Cape St. Vincent, a historic site for European maritime exploration. On 11 June 1799, the ship observed a large school of jellyfish in the Atlantic. As the Pizarro approached the Canary Islands, it passed Lanzarote on 16 June 1799, where Humboldt and Bonpland observed volcanic landscapes, including the Timanfaya volcano, which had last erupted in the 1730s. Navigation among the islands was challenging due to fog and unpredictable winds. The crew mistook a rock formation on Graciosa for a coastal castle, and the ship narrowly avoided being driven onto rocks by strong currents during the night. On 19 June 1799, the Pizarro arrived near Grand Canary. Dense fog delayed progress, but as it cleared, the ship’s company saw Pico del Teide, the volcanic peak of Tenerife, which Humboldt and Bonpland intended to ascend. British warships were observed nearby, but the Pizarro was protected by the guns of a Spanish fort and continued safely.

=== Tenerife ===
Upon landing on Tenerife, Humboldt and Bonpland were received by local officials and noted the distinctive flora of the island, including bananas, papaws, and ornamental plants. On June 20, before dawn,Bonpland an Humboldt departed with guides and mules for La Orotava, near the Teide volcano. They passed through San Cristébal, built on a basalt ridge around the Peak of Tenerife, and paused to inspect rocks, eventually arriving at La Laguna, the capital of Tenerife. After the climbing Humboldt and his party left La Laguna, traversing a landscape rich in plant diversity, including palms, orange trees, vines, and cacti. The region’s natural beauty was contrasted by socio-economic inequality, with land concentrated among a few wealthy planters and the indigenous population living in poverty. The group passed through Juan de la Rambla, Victoria, and Matanza, sites of both agricultural abundance and historical conflict with Spanish conquest in the fifteenth century.

In La Orotava, they visited the botanical garden and met Monsieur LeGros, the French vice-consul, who had lived on Tenerife since being shipwrecked and agreed to guide their ascent of Pico del Teide. On 21 June 1799, the climbing party, which included LeGros, other local guides, and consular staff, departed for the volcano. The route passed solidly built but somber towns, lush gardens, and a renowned dragon tree, a species present in the Canaries but native to the West Indies, illustrating the complexities of plant distribution. The ascent led through forests of chestnut, laurels, and heaths, and onto higher, barren volcanic plains such as Llano del Retama, where vegetation diminished and only shrubs and wildlife remained. At Estancia de los Ingleses, a traditional rest point at about 8,000 feet (2,400 m), the group endured a cold, windy night before continuing the climb at 3 a.m. on 22 June 1799. They crossed the Malpays, an area of broken lava and little vegetation, and reached the summit at 8 a.m.

At the peak, the party observed the structure of the volcano, measured ground temperatures, and collected air samples. The elliptical crater showed no recent eruptions inside, but the volcano remained active, with recent lava flows and geothermal activity. The summit provided panoramic views of the surrounding islands and the diverse ecological zones descending from the peak, which Humboldt recorded in a sketch. He noted five distinct vegetation zones, from grasses at the summit to cultivated tropical and temperate plants near the coast. The descent took the party back through the varying ecological regions. Humboldt made broader geological observations, considering questions about the structure and origins of volcanoes and the laws governing geological phenomena. The round trip from La Orotava to the summit and back lasted twenty-one hours. The Pizarro’s departure was delayed until 24 or 25 June 1799 due to the presence of an English squadron, allowing Humboldt and Bonpland additional time to explore the island’s surroundings. During this period, Humboldt investigated the fate of the Guanches, the indigenous people of the Canaries, concluding that they had been destroyed by European conquest and slavery, with survivors assimilated into the Spanish population.

The Pizarro crossed the Tropic of Cancer on June 27, sailing through the Atlantic and carefully avoiding the area labeled “Bank of Maal-strom,” whose dangers Humboldt doubted existed in the calm tropics. The ship passed west of the Cape Verde Islands, once claimed for Portugal by Alvise da Mosto, and entered the Sargasso Sea, a vast region of floating seaweed previously described by Columbus. Here, the crew encountered a partially submerged, abandoned ship covered in seaweed, which Humboldt surmised had drifted from the rough North Atlantic rather than sinking locally. Throughout the voyage, Humboldt and Bonpland conducted systematic scientific observations, measuring a wide array of atmospheric and oceanic variables and recording them meticulously. The two naturalists spent their evenings observing unfamiliar southern constellations, including the Southern Cross, which stirred Humboldt’s sense of distance from Europe.

The ship enjoyed a relatively smooth journey across the Atlantic, following established routes aided by predictable trade winds. The calm seas known as el Golfo de las Damas made for easy sailing, and the crew rarely needed to adjust the sails. Approaching the West Indies, the weather changed, with frequent tropical squalls and the distinctive "dark winds," phenomena new to Humboldt but familiar in the region. He noted the remarkable stability of temperatures and the mildness of the equatorial climate at sea. The tranquil progress was disrupted when a typhus epidemic broke out on board, a common danger in the cramped and unsanitary conditions of ships at the time. Typhus, spread by lice, quickly incapacitated several passengers and crew members. Captain Cagigal remained indifferent to the outbreak, refusing preventative measures, while the ship’s surgeon relied on ineffective treatments based on erroneous theories of disease.

Fear spread among the passengers, including Humboldt, who regretted not having quinine bark among his supplies. On July 8, a sailor gravely ill with the disease was brought on deck for last rites but began to recover, reinforcing the surgeon’s misguided confidence in his methods. Another passenger, a young Asturian man pressured into emigrating to Cuba, succumbed to the disease despite his friend’s devoted care, leaving the latter bereft and anxious about his prospects. The young man’s death was marked by a somber shipboard burial, deepening Humboldt’s melancholy as the ship neared the Caribbean islands. Spurred by the worsening epidemic, the captain decided to bypass Havana and proceed directly to Cumana in Venezuela, forcing all passengers to remain aboard. Nearing Cumana on July 15, the Pizarro encountered local Guayqueria, who approached after initial hesitation.

The Natives, tall and strong, offered the crew gifts and information about the local geography. Their leader, Carlos del Pino, agreed to pilot the ship through safe channels. The Pizarro passed the deserted island of Cubagua, once prosperous due to its pearl fisheries, and neared the mountainous coast of Margarita. Humboldt spent his last night at sea conversing with del Pino about the region’s exotic wildlife and plants, forming a valuable friendship. At dawn on July 16, Humboldt and Bonpland saw the lush South American mainland for the first time. The Pizarro anchored at Cumana after a voyage of forty-one days from La Coruña, marking the end of their Atlantic crossing and the beginning of their explorations in the New World.

== Route and Major Stages ==
=== Venezuela ===
==== Cumaná ====
On the morning of July 16, 1799, the Pizarro anchored at Cumana, and even those weakened by typhus managed to witness their arrival. Humboldt, eager to immerse himself in the new environment, immediately visited the home of their native guide, disregarding the captain's reminder about the need to present credentials to the Governor first. In the shade of a mimosa tree, surrounded by unfamiliar tropical fragrances and the daily life of their host’s family, Humboldt found the experience more rewarding than any official audience could provide. The town of Cumana, or what remained of it after a devastating earthquake, presented a scene of partial ruin. Governor Don Vicente Emparán, a progressive and scientifically minded official, welcomed the explorers warmly. As head of New Andalusia, then part of the Spanish colony of New Granada, Emparán took pride in introducing Humboldt and Bonpland to local crafts, especially textiles and furniture made from native materials. His appreciation for science ensured that Humboldt and Bonpland received favorable treatment during their South American travels. The natural scenery, with its mist-shrouded mountains, vibrant birds, and luxuriant plant life, left Humboldt and Bonpland exhilarated and overwhelmed by the proliferation of unfamiliar sights, sounds, and smells.

The explorers quickly secured a spacious house constructed of local woods, cooled by the breeze through open windows. The household was managed by a former naval quartermaster with the help of Black servants, and provisions were generally abundant except for flour. The initial weeks were spent testing scientific instruments and botanizing in the surrounding plains, astonished by the rapid growth and size of local vegetation. Humboldt noted the presence of plant species newly described by science, indicating the region’s botanical richness and the likelihood that many smaller plants remained undocumented. The scientific curiosity of the local population matched that of the visitors. The house became a destination for townspeople eager to observe scientific demonstrations, especially with the microscope, which fascinated Cumana's women. Humboldt reciprocated by attending local dances, learning both traditional and modern forms. Despite social distractions, Humboldt’s chief focus was meteorological observation, taking advantage of the region’s stable climate to collect data on atmospheric conditions.

Humboldt’s house, situated on the main square, also exposed him to the realities of the local slave market. He was deeply disturbed by the sight of enslaved Africans being prepared for sale, their bodies oiled and inspected by buyers. While generally tolerant and patient in his dealings with others, Humboldt’s abhorrence of slavery was absolute. He could not accept rationalizations for the system, regardless of claims that Spanish slaves fared better than those elsewhere. Venturing beyond Cumana, Humboldt and Bonpland received hospitality from local mulatto peasants, who were unfamiliar with their European origins but generous nonetheless. During one such excursion, they learned of a local laborer named Francisco Loyano, who had reportedly nursed a child with his own milk due to unusual lactation, a fact confirmed by local witnesses and Bonpland’s examination. By early September, acclimatized and prepared, Humboldt and Bonpland embarked on their first significant inland journey to the Cumanagoto tribe missions in the mountains south of Cumana.

The challenging route led them through dense rainforest, across mountain streams, and along precipitous paths, where they marveled at the forest’s grandeur and the diversity of wildlife. The mission headquarters at Caripe, a cool, spring-fed location surrounded by mountains, became their base. Humboldt was surprised to find the Capuchin monks welcoming and tolerant, despite religious differences, and noted the presence of contemporary scientific texts among them. Daily life at Caripe was a blend of scientific work and cultural observation. Humboldt and Bonpland collected plants, studied the Cumanagoto language, and documented local customs, including the children’s consumption of large millipedes. Meals at the monastery reflected the monks’ sacrifices, as they often gave up their own rations for the guests. The soundscape was dominated by howler monkeys, especially during rain, and opportunities for astronomical observation were rare due to persistent mist.

==== Guacharo Cave and reflections on mission life ====
One major scientific highlight was the exploration of the famed Guacharo Cave, known locally as ‘the mine of fat’. The cave’s entrance, surrounded by luxuriant vegetation and orchids, led to vast chambers inhabited by large colonies of oil-birds, previously unknown to science. The birds’ fat was harvested annually by locals for cooking oil. The cave expedition revealed bizarre subterranean plants, pale and etiolated, growing in the darkness from seeds dropped by the birds. The indigenous guides, convinced of spirits beyond the cave’s first chamber, refused to proceed further, and the explorers were forced to turn back. Observing mission life, Humboldt saw both advantages and shortcomings. While the mission system protected the Chayma from violence and provided stability, it also imposed a stifling routine and eroded traditional culture, leaving the Natives apathetic and disengaged. Humboldt recognized the superficiality of Christian conversion among them and noted their regret at the loss of traditional freedoms.

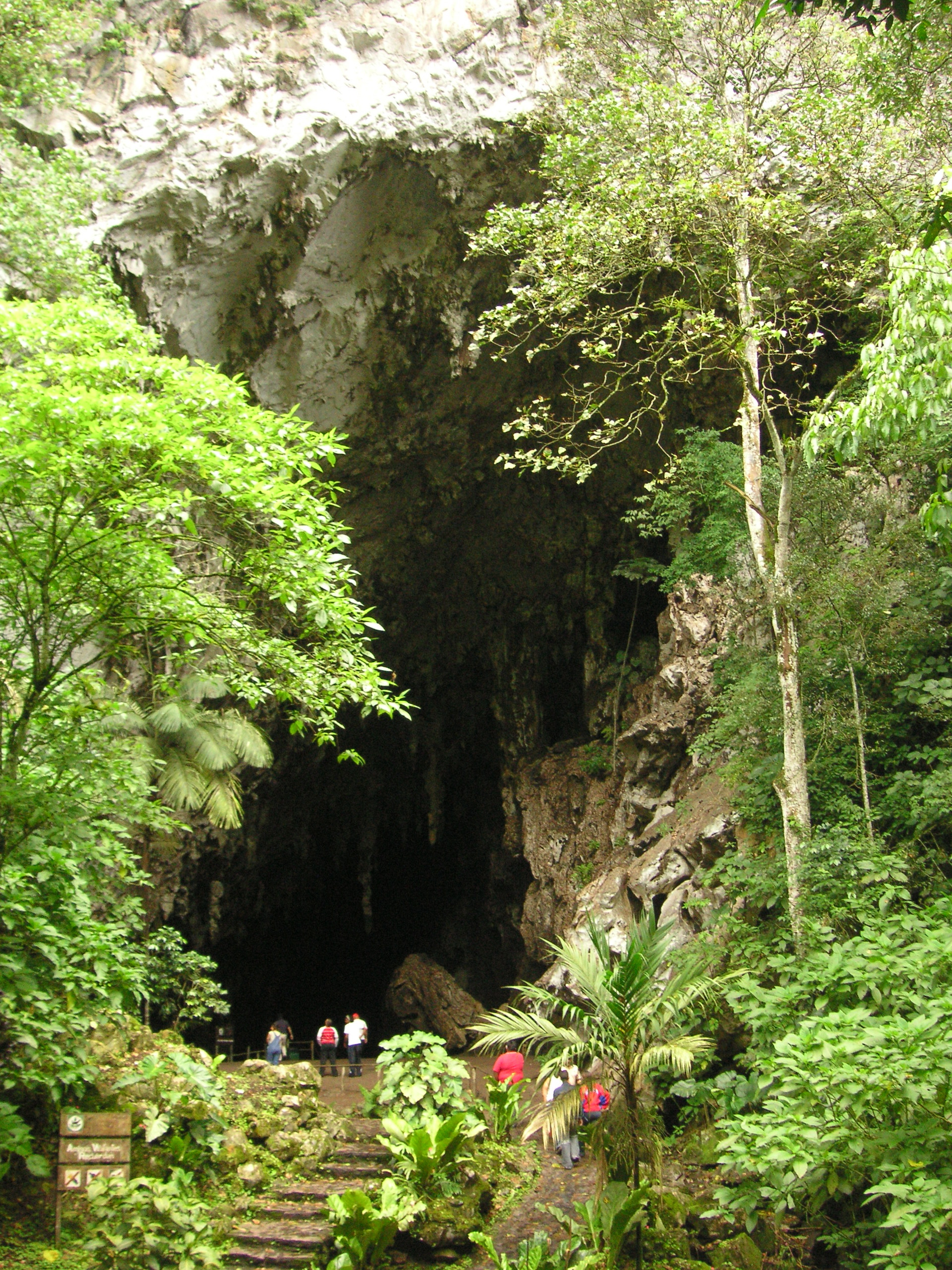
Entrance to the Cueva del Guacharo (Guacharo Cave)

Upon returning to Cumana, Humboldt and Bonpland abandoned plans to proceed to Havana, instead deciding to explore the Orinoco. Their time in Cumana was punctuated by dramatic events. Bonpland was attacked by a deranged local, suffering a head injury that left him dazed for months. Shortly after, Humboldt experienced his first earthquake, noting the vertical jolts and the reduction in magnetic dip, even as the local population panicked. A week later, an extraordinary meteor shower dazzled the town, with thousands of fireballs illuminating the sky. Humboldt’s precise observations of the event contributed to subsequent scientific study of meteorites. The local population, already unnerved by recent earthquakes, interpreted the meteor shower as another ominous sign. On November 16, Humboldt and Bonpland departed Cumana by sea, bound for Caracas.

==== Llanos and tropical ecology ====
In February 1800, Humboldt and Bonpland departed the Caribbean coast, setting their sights on the Orinoco River. This important northern neighbor of the Amazon promised a gateway into the equatorial jungles, famed for their extraordinary biodiversity and dense tropical vegetation. For Humboldt, the journey offered a long-awaited opportunity to conduct magnetic measurements at latitudes where Earth’s magnetism would differ significantly from what he had found in Europe. The expedition also carried the excitement of possibly confirming the rumored connection between the Orinoco and Amazon or Rio Negro river systems—a geographical mystery that had fascinated explorers for years.

The most direct route from Caracas to the Orinoco would have been to cross the southern mountain chain between Baruta and Salamanca, traverse the savannahs of Ocumare, and embark at Cabruta near the Rio Guarico’s mouth. However, this shortcut would have denied the travelers the chance to survey the most fertile and cultivated regions of the province—the valleys of Aragua—along with valuable opportunities to measure the elevation of the coastal mountain chain by barometer and to descend the Rio Apure to its meeting point with the Orinoco. From Puerto Cabello, Humboldt and Bonpland made their way across the coastal ranges and llanos towards Lake Valencia. The heat was so intense that they often rode at night to avoid the sun’s punishing rays. Along their route, they visited cocoa and sugar cane plantations—operations that, much to Humboldt’s dismay, were still worked by enslaved laborers.

In these cultivated areas, Humboldt studied water management issues. He observed that deforestation had interrupted the natural water cycle: the loss of forests as reservoirs led to severe soil desiccation under the relentless sun. At Lake Valencia, he recognized that the lake’s water level had once been higher and warned that continued settlement and irrigation would cause further decline—a prediction since borne out, as the lake has lost a third of its volume. He also took a keen interest in the municipal systems of the settlements, criticizing the Spanish colonial policy that stifled local self-government and, in his view, suppressed economic development. Despite these structural problems, the travelers, armed with letters of recommendation, received warm welcomes in each village and town.

One of Humboldt’s most memorable encounters in the Aragua valleys was with the remarkable palo de vaca or cow tree (also called “arbol de leche,” the milk tree), a species previously unknown to European science. Although the tree resembled the unremarkable star apple, it possessed an extraordinary quality: when its trunk was cut, it oozed a thick, fragrant, drinkable sap—essentially, plant milk. Humboldt and Bonpland sampled this sap without ill effect and watched as the indigenous people tapped the trees at sunrise, collecting the milk in bowls to drink or carry home. Only experienced gatherers knew which trees would produce the best milk. Humboldt reflected on the significance of milk and grain in human culture: while grains’ starch came solely from plants and milk traditionally from animals, here was a tree that united both sources in a single organism.

By March, the explorers reached the Llanos, a vast plain that, at the end of the dry season, appeared desolate and lifeless. With the arrival of the rains in May, the landscape underwent a dramatic transformation: new grasses sprouted, mimosas and aquatic plants flowered, and wildlife emerged from a kind of “summer hibernation.” As the rain persisted, the Llanos flooded, creating an immense inland sea navigable by large vessels. Native animals—jaguars, agoutis, deer, antelope, armadillos, hares, capybaras, and more—along with domesticated horses, cattle, oxen, and mules, were forced to swim between islands of higher ground, constantly threatened by crocodiles and electric eels. During a brief stop at Calabozo, Humboldt investigated the electric eel, a species that fascinated him for its unique ability to generate electricity. By March 27, 1800, the travelers reached the Apure River. There, they continued their journey in a pirogue, a large indigenous canoe, following the river’s course to its confluence with the Orinoco, eager to explore the mysteries and marvels of the South American interior.

==== Orinoco River exploration ====
Humboldt’s expedition to the Upper Orinoco and the Casiquiare canal began at 4 a.m. on March 30, 1800, departing from San Fernando de Apure. The transition from the dry Llanos to the river marked a significant environmental change. The team, which included Don Nicolas Sotto, four Native rowers, and a pilot, traveled in a large sailing canoe outfitted with a cabin made of leaves and ox-hide benches. The river’s dense forests replaced the open horizons of the plains, and travel became more constrained. Wildlife was abundant, with numerous birds, capybaras, river dolphins, tapirs, peccaries, and alligators observed along the riverbanks, as well as piranhas and stingrays in the water. Humboldt noted the intensity of insect life, particularly at midday.

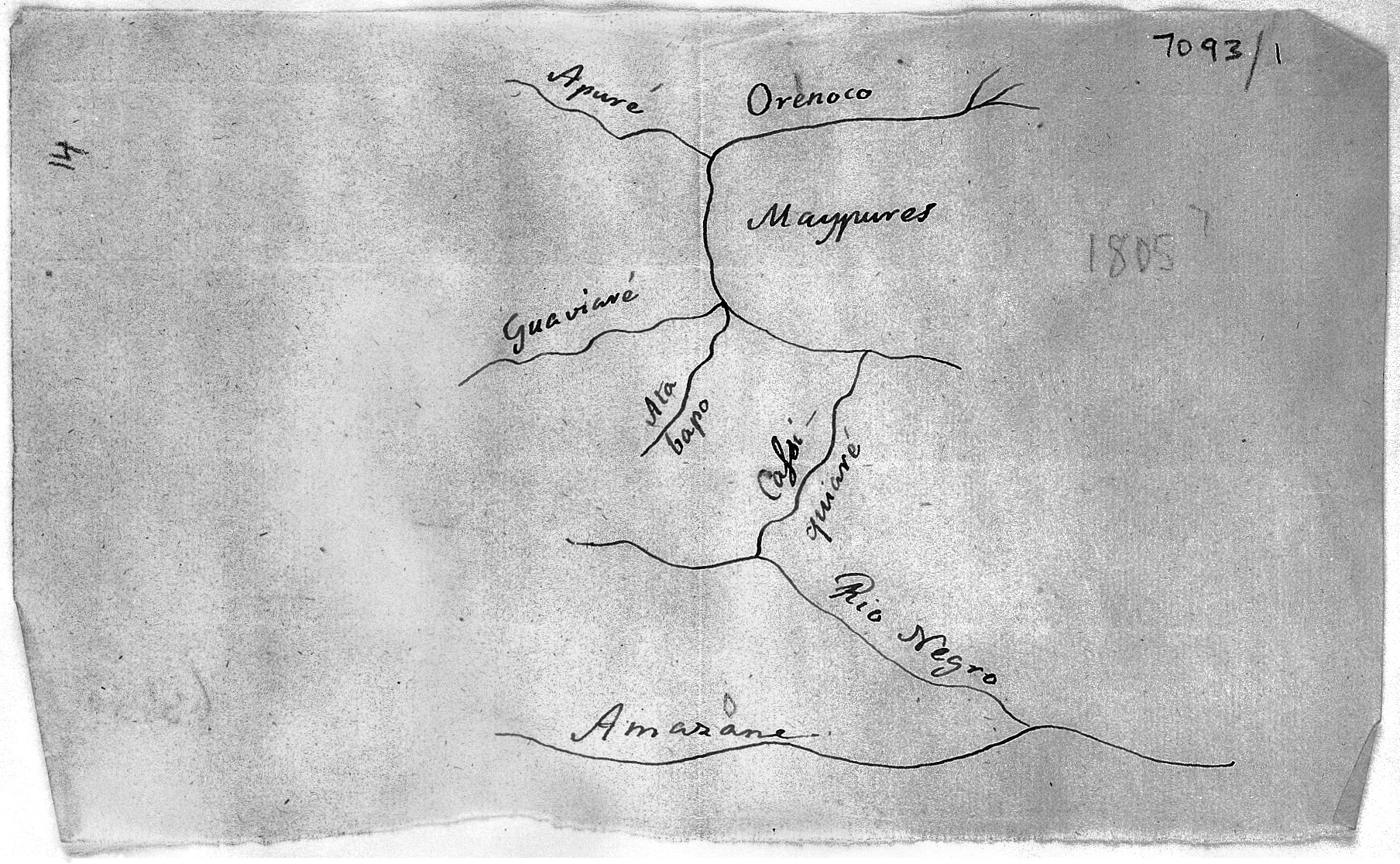
Sketch of the Orinoco Casiquire Amazon River-System, drawn by Alexander von Humboldt 1799.

Nights were spent camping on riverbanks, where hammocks were usually slung between trees or, when trees were absent, from canoe paddles or on ox-hides. This exposed the expedition to risks from snakes, alligators, and jaguars, which were especially prevalent and feared by local Natives. Nighttime was often unsettled due to animal activity, including monkeys, peccaries, sloths, and birds.Shortly after departure, a sudden squall nearly overturned the canoe, (Note: Humboldt could not swim) but a shift in wind stabilized the vessel. The following morning, the expedition encountered a Carib family traveling from the mouth of the Orinoco to collect turtle eggs, an event that attracted hundreds of Natives from various tribes and a few white traders. The eggs were rendered for oil, used for cooking and lighting, though overharvesting threatened the turtle population.

At the Island of the Tortoises, Native tribes gathered annually to harvest turtle eggs, each tribe distinguished by unique body paint. Humboldt observed the process and noted that the previous Jesuit supervisors had ensured some eggs were left to hatch, but that their successors, the Franciscans, did not exercise such care, causing a decline in the turtle population. The Native crew from San Fernando departed at the turtle islands, as they lacked experience with the rapids ahead. The expedition switched to a smaller, less comfortable canoe, fashioned from a single tree trunk, which further limited space and increased exposure to environmental discomforts. Insect infestations, food shortages, and the destruction of provisions by rain and humidity presented ongoing challenges. Despite these hardships, Humboldt remained healthy and productive, documenting his scientific observations.

Progressing up the Orinoco, the expedition reached Pararuma, where they met missionaries and Father Bernardo Zea, missionary of Atures and Maipures, who agreed to guide them further. Due to the rapids, a smaller canoe was acquired. The new canoe, hollowed from a single tree, was forty feet long and less than three feet wide. The arrangement left little space, resulting in cramped conditions for the passengers, supplies, and animal specimens. Native canoemen occupied the bow, and a mulatto servant from Cumana managed provisions and cooking. Insects continued to be a significant nuisance, and local methods of mitigation included sleeping in smoke-filled ovens, burying oneself in sand, or using mud and turtle oil as repellents. Humboldt also observed the use of rubber stoppers provided by local Natives.

As the river narrowed, navigation through the Great Cataracts of Atures and Maipures required both paddling and hauling the canoe overland. Humboldt and Bonpland stayed at Father Zea’s mission during this process, where they observed a declining Native population, poor living conditions, and ongoing disease. Insect bites became a dominant hardship. Beyond the cataracts, the expedition entered little-documented territory. Communication was hampered by the diversity of indigenous languages, and the travelers relied on sign language and the limited information provided by missionaries. At the Mission of Javita, they organized an overland portage of their canoe to the Pimichin, which connected them to the Rio Negro. This portage required several days and the labor of over twenty Natives. Upon reaching the Pimichin and then the Rio Negro, the expedition entered a new phase of their journey. They encountered clear “black-water” rivers, a contrast to the muddy white waters of the Orinoco, and observed changes in vegetation and animal life. Food supplies remained scarce, and insects continued to be a challenge.

The expedition reached San Carlos, a military post on the Brazil-Venezuela border, on 7 May. Humboldt considered continuing to the Atlantic via the Amazon but abandoned this idea. Portuguese authorities in Brazil had issued a warrant for his arrest, suspecting him of espionage and subversion. After three days, the expedition departed San Carlos, beginning the return to Venezuela via the Casiquiare canal. On 10 May, the party entered the Casiquiare, a waterway many European geographers still doubted existed. Insects swarmed, especially the tiny jejen. Humboldt paused at San Francisco Solano mission to take astronomical readings and acquire two birds from local Natives, expanding his collection of animals. Their boat became increasingly crowded with both people and creatures.Humboldt observed the behavior and intelligence of his animals, especially the titi monkeys, which displayed childlike expressions and intelligence. Despite the inconvenience, the animals provided diversion from constant insect attacks.

The next day, the group stopped at Culimacari rock, where Humboldt made precise astronomical observations. This confirmed the Casiquiare’s position and its function as the world’s only natural canal linking two major river systems, the Orinoco and the Amazon. The Casiquiare’s existence had long been denied in Europe, though local knowledge and previous Spanish exploration had already established its reality. Departing Culimacari early on 12 May, the expedition faced a strong current and slow progress. At the mission of Mandavaca, Humboldt found a missionary who spoke of his isolation and the small, scattered Native population. He also described acts of violence and cannibalism among the local peoples, which Humboldt later confirmed through conversation with a Native assistant. The journey along the Casiquiare became increasingly difficult. Food was scarce, and the group survived on ants and dry cacao mixed with river water. Spirits remained intact as the expedition neared the Orinoco. On 20 May, a jaguar carried off their dog during the night, causing distress. On 21 May the party rejoined the Orinoco, now able to travel downstream toward Angostura.

Humboldt predicted commercial importance for the Casiquiare, but this vision was never realized. The canal remained a remote and sparsely populated wilderness, unchanged over centuries. The Upper Orinoco, at its junction with the Casiquiare, was over a thousand miles from the sea and still more than a quarter mile wide. The expedition proceeded to Esmeralda, a remote mission at the foot of the Sierra Duida. The settlement was isolated and regarded as a place of hardship, plagued by insects and food shortages. Esmeralda was famous for the production of curare, a potent poison prepared by local Natives. Humboldt and Bonpland observed its preparation and collected samples, narrowly avoiding accidental poisoning. Hostile indigenous groups upriver from Esmeralda forced the party to abandon plans to explore the Orinoco’s source.

Weakened by insects, poor food, and cramped conditions, the expedition left Esmeralda on 23 May. They traveled rapidly downstream, reaching the Atures rapids by the end of May. Humboldt visited the cavern of Ataruipe, discovering hundreds of well-preserved Native skeletons. He collected several for scientific study, which later caused difficulties with locals who recognized the resin used in their preparation. The expedition passed through the rapids for the last time. Father Zea left to rejoin his mission. Many of the local Natives suffered from illness. Bonpland soon fell sick but continued to collect plants despite worsening health. In early June, the group reached Uruana and encountered the Ottomac people. Humboldt described them as unruly, hard to govern, and addicted to a hallucinogenic drug. He noted their unusual physiological characteristics.

On 7 June, Humboldt, Bonpland, and Sotto began the final 300 miles of their journey. As the river widened, the population grew more diverse. They reached Angostura, now Ciudad Bolivar, on 13 June, completing a pioneering exploration of 1,500 miles between the Orinoco and Amazon basins. The expedition measured positions of more than 50 locations, collected magnetic data, and amassed 12,000 plant specimens, many new to science. Humboldt credited Bonpland’s energy and courage. The climate damaged a significant portion of their botanical collection. Shortly after arrival in Angostura, Humboldt, Bonpland, and a servant became seriously ill, likely with typhoid. Humboldt recovered quickly, but Bonpland’s illness was severe and slow to resolve. After a month, Bonpland was fit enough for the journey across the Llanos to the coast. Their return was delayed by a privateer, but British naval intervention rescued them. By late August 1800, they reached Cumana, concluding the first phase of their South American expedition after nearly a year away.

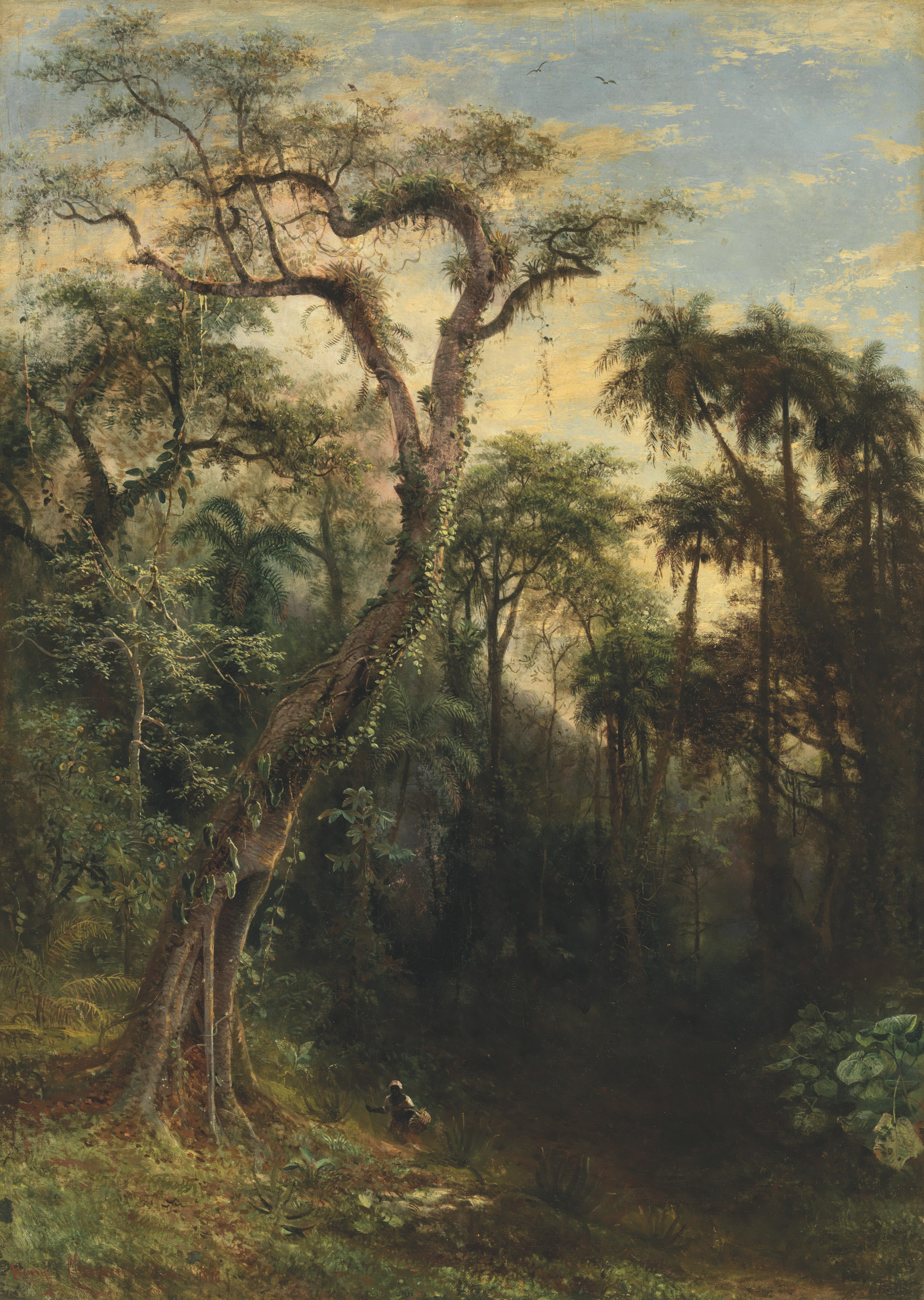
Cuban rainforest oil painting by Henry Cleenewerck

=== Cuba (1800–1801) ===
On November 24, 1800, Humboldt and Bonpland departed the Venezuelan coast for Havana in a small vessel, enduring a perilous, storm-ridden journey of twenty-five days. Upon arrival, Havana presented a crowded and unsanitary environment, with a population of 44,000, half of whom were people of African descent. The city, nearly as large as New York due to its suburbs, was afflicted by yellow fever. The travelers were welcomed with receptions and enjoyed the hospitality of the local elite. Humboldt undertook a survey of the harbor, the principal commercial and naval base of Spanish colonial power in the Caribbean, correcting its geographic position. Humboldt and Bonpland then traveled into the Cuban interior, visiting sugar plantations, factories, and fields of indigo, tobacco, and cotton. They observed the harsh conditions under which enslaved people labored. Humboldt aimed to make an objective comparison between Cuba and South American societies.

His observations culminated in the Political Essay on the Island of Cuba, a comprehensive geographic study examining the island’s physical and economic conditions, as well as the social realities of slavery. Published in 1828, the work was notable for its data and its condemnation of slavery, resonating during the Latin American independence movements.

If the legislation of the Antilles and the condition of the colored population does not experience some salutary change, and if discussion without action is continued, the political power may well pass into the hands of that class which holds the might of labor, the will to throw off the yoke

— Alexander von Humboldt

Humboldt also analyzed demographic data. In Cumana, he had recorded 6,000 people of color among 110,000 white and Creole residents. In Havana, government archives revealed that more than 2,130,000 Africans had been forcibly transported to British Caribbean territories over the previous century. In 1806, the slave trade involved 53,000 sales in British dominions and 15,000 in the United States. Humboldt estimated that from 1670 to 1825, nearly five million Africans were brought to the West Indies, not counting deaths during the Middle Passage. He was deeply affected by the realities of slavery, expressing indignation and advocating for strict enforcement of anti-slavery laws. He hoped that anti-slavery principles would spread southward in the Americas.

The journey through Cuba was shortened when Humboldt received news of Captain Baudin’s French scientific expedition, expected on the Peruvian coast within a year. Eager to join this enterprise, Humboldt postponed plans to visit North America, instead preparing to travel from Cuba to South America, crossing the Isthmus of Panama and the Andes to Lima. He wrote to Baudin, proposing to join the expedition and offering to continue his journey independently if necessary. Humboldt’s decision to return to South America was influenced by scientific opportunities, such as the chance to study the Andes’ environmental effects on plant life and to meet the botanist José Celestino Mutis in Bogotá. This return also allowed for consolidation of previous research findings. During his time in Havana, Humboldt encountered the Scottish botanist John Fraser and his son, who had survived a shipwreck. Humboldt assisted them and arranged for Fraser’s son to join him in Mexico, though the latter chose to return to London. Fraser agreed to take two cases of Humboldt’s botanical specimens to England for safekeeping until they could be sent to Berlin. From Havana, Humboldt and Bonpland prepared to sail to Cartagena or Portobello, depending on conditions, intent on continuing their scientific exploration of South America.

=== New Granada (Colombia) ===
Sailing southeast, the sloop entered the Gulf of Batabano, passing Isla de Pinos and navigating the challenging Jardines y Jardinillos archipelago, a region earlier named by Columbus. Humboldt measured latitudes and studied water characteristics, noting the solitude of the area, which was once frequented by fishermen. The journey was slow, with stops for geological and botanical observations. The crew’s cruelty toward wildlife disturbed Humboldt. After several days, the ship entered open water and was driven off course by winds toward the Cayman Islands before resuming its route to the Colombian coast.

On March 24, the ship arrived in the Gulf of Santa Marta, enduring rough weather before seeking shelter near the Rio Sint. The travelers landed in a remote area, where locals regarded them with suspicion. Humboldt met a fellow German among palm wine workers, who offered insights about the climate but little else. After collecting botanical specimens, the travelers faced further storms at sea, nearly capsizing before finally finding shelter. Humboldt attempted to make astronomical observations to determine longitude but was prevented by the captain due to difficult terrain. An encounter with escaped enslaved people left Humboldt reflecting on the region’s hardships and the blunted sympathy caused by slavery.

Arriving in Cartagena, Humboldt and Bonpland spent six days confirming geographical data and exploring the area. Cartagena, a key Spanish colonial port, faced challenges in defending its harbor. The city was surrounded by marshes and hills, and Humboldt recorded local stories, including a violent episode involving an acacia tree. Originally planning to cross Panama and sail south, Humboldt learned this route was impractical and instead decided to travel overland through the Andes, which promised rich opportunities for scientific study. This change, like earlier unplanned shifts in his journey, led Humboldt to groundbreaking discoveries in several scientific fields and contributed significantly to his later fame.

The journey inland to the eastern Cordilleras began with a nearly 500-mile trip south up the Rio Magdalena, through dense forests to Honda. Humboldt and Bonpland spent over six weeks in a native canoe, hindered by insects, rain, and slow progress against the current. Crew members including Bonpland suffered exhaustion and disease, only Humboldt remained healthy and continued their scientific work. Upon reaching Honda in mid-June, they faced a difficult ascent of 9,000 feet to the plateau of Santa Fé de Bogotá. The road was in poor condition, narrow, and often little more than rock-hewn steps. As they approached Bogotá, their arrival was celebrated with a public procession led by local dignitaries and citizens. Humboldt was honored as a distinguished guest, while the novelty of foreigners attracted public attention. Bonpland’s illness kept them in Bogotá for two months, during which Humboldt received news from Europe, lunched with the Viceroy, studied fossils and minerals, visited Lake Guatavita, and measured mountain heights.

=== Ecuador ===
Once Bonpland recovered, the expedition departed for Quito via the difficult Quindiu Pass, navigating steep terrain, dense forests, and swamps. They refused to use local indigenous porters, the silleros carrying their own provisions for the journey. From Cartago, the route continued south to Popayán, where they conducted scientific excursions, including a visit to the volcano of Puracé. Next, they crossed the harsh Paramos of Pasto, a cold, desolate plateau marked by volcanic activity and frequent mists. The road was dangerous and strewn with animal bones. The travelers endured harsh conditions, sheltering under makeshift tents, and spent Christmas in Pasto before finally reaching Quito in early January. In Quito, Humboldt described the city as attractive but cold and prone to earthquakes, noting the effects of the 1797 disaster. Despite frequent tremors, the residents were lively and pleasure-seeking.

Humboldt spent six months in Quito, socializing with prominent families, especially the Marqués de Selvalegre’s. He formed a close bond with Carlos Montúfar, who joined his later travels. Humboldt dedicated much of his time to studying the region’s volcanoes, including Pichincha, Cotopaxi, Antisana, Tungurahua, Iliniza, and Chimborazo. Mountaineering was rare, and Humboldt developed his techniques through experience and acclimatization. His first attempt to climb Pichincha ended in physical distress, but he persevered, eventually reaching significant heights and conducting scientific observations. His explorations on Pichincha included documenting frequent earthquakes, which led to local rumors attributing the tremors to his presence. Humboldt’s work during this period advanced scientific understanding of high-altitude geology and volcanology.

==== Climbing Chimborazo ====
Humboldt and Bonpland began their ascent of Chimborazo from the plain of Tapia, situated at 3,163 yards (2,892 m) above sea level. The route led through a high plateau between the eastern and western chains of the Andes, passing sparse vegetation such as cacti and Schinus molle, as well as herds of llamas. The altitude caused agricultural difficulties, since nocturnal cooling often resulted in frozen crops. Before reaching Calpi, they visited Lican, once an important settlement before the Spanish conquest, but now reduced to a small village. Indigenous people believed that wild llamas on Chimborazo descended from domesticated herds scattered after the destruction of Lican.

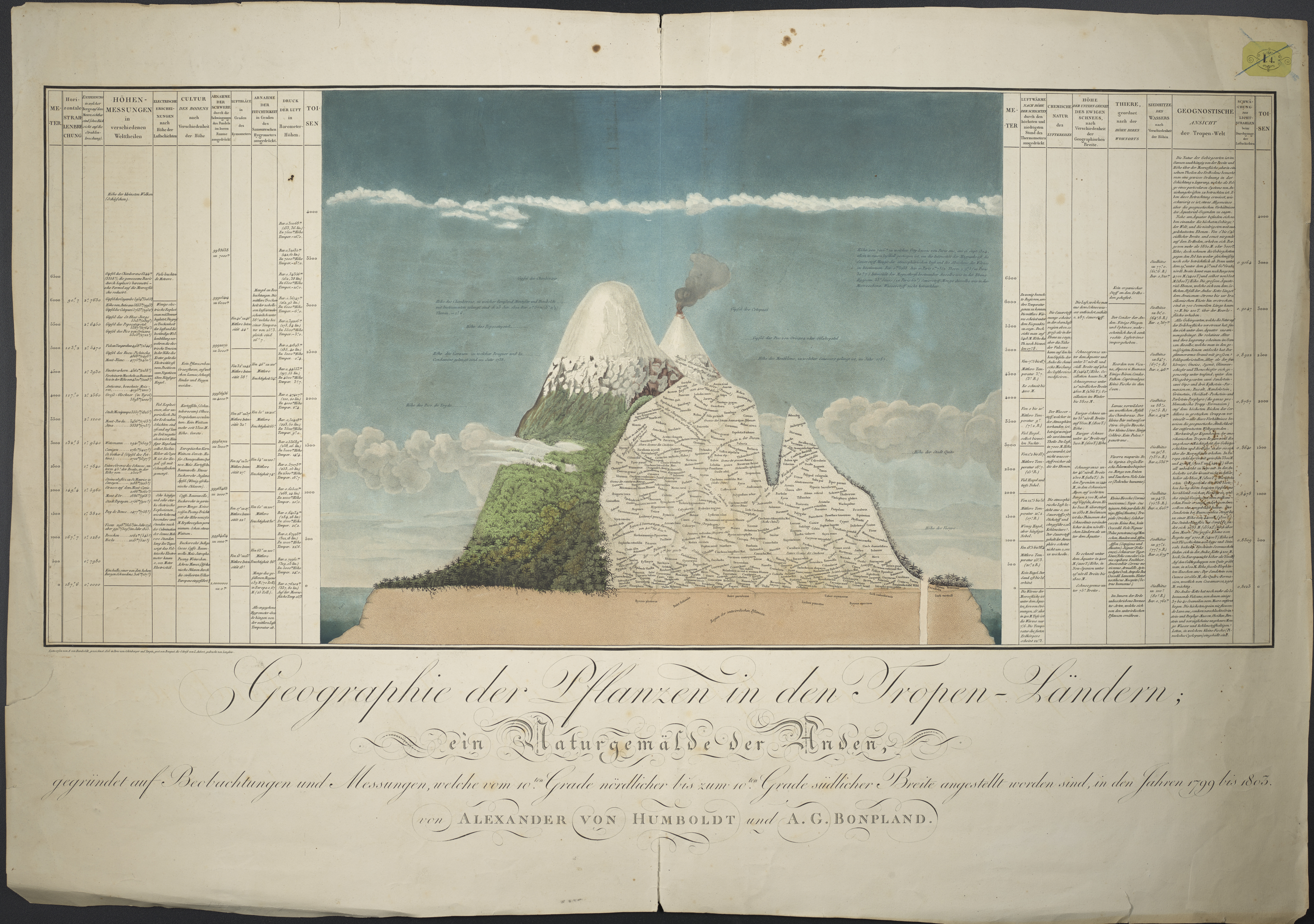
Colored drawing of the Naturgemälde by Alexander von Humboldt with altitude measurements, soil conditions, vegetation, etc. in tables on the left and right side.

The travelers spent the night in Calpi, which Humboldt measured at 3,452 yards (3,157 m) meters above sea level. On June 23, they began the main phase of their Chimborazo expedition, choosing a south-southeast route favored by their Indigenous guides, though only a few guides had reached the limits of the perpetual snow. Humboldt observed that Chimborazo was surrounded by step-like, grass-covered plateaus, which he compared to former lake beds and similar terrace formations in the Alps. The flora of these grasslands was dominated by grass species common in northern Europe, with few dicotyledonous herbs and limited floral diversity compared to other Andean peaks. Temperatures in the region varied strongly between day and night, and the mean annual temperature at this elevation was approximately nine degrees Celsius.

Humboldt intended to perform trigonometric measurements on the plateau of Sisgun, but fog obscured the summit, preventing accurate results. The ascent began from the house of the mayor of Calpi, with Humboldt, Bonpland, and Montúfar proceeding on foot after the terrain became too difficult for mules. The group advanced slowly along a narrow ridge, exposed to steep drops and sharp rocks, without specialized climbing equipment. Increasing altitude brought symptoms of altitude sickness such as nausea, dizziness, and nosebleeds, while the temperature dropped and their clothing provided little protection. Despite these challenges, the party continued to conduct scientific observations. At the snow line, all but one of their Indigenous porters turned back.

When the mist cleared, the summit appeared close, encouraging the climbers onward. Their progress was halted by a deep, wide crevasse filled with soft snow, which could not be crossed. Weak from the ascent and the cold, they were forced to stop. Humboldt measured their altitude at 6,428.707 yards (5,878.410 m) about 432 yards (395 m) below the summit. The group experienced a sense of isolation above the clouds, recognizing the significance of their achievement. During the descent, they encountered hail and a snowstorm that temporarily concealed the trail. As the weather improved, they observed lichen, a fly, and a butterfly above the snow line, marking the first recorded sightings of insects at such heights. The party returned to their mules shortly after two in the afternoon, concluding their attempt on Chimborazo.

=== Peru ===
The travelers gradually descended into the cinchona forests and former Inca territories. In Riobamba, they stayed with Montufar’s brother, where Humboldt accessed rare sixteenth-century manuscripts written in an extinct dialect and later translated into Spanish. These documents described pre-conquest events and the major eruption of Nevado de Altar volcano, which affected nearby towns with ash for seven years. Traveling from Riobamba to Cuenca across the Paramo of Azuay, Humboldt studied the remains of the Inca road, notable for its precise porphyry paving and straightness, comparable to Roman roads, leading to Cuzco. He also visited the ruins of Inca Tapayupangi’s palace and its summer house carved from rock, which offered impressive views and prompted Humboldt to admire Inca public works.

Southward, the group had to ford the Rio Guancabamba, a tributary of the Amazon, twenty-seven times. Although not wide, the river’s strong current endangered their mules, which carried important collections. Humboldt described the anxiety of watching their passage. Further along, he observed the local postal system known as “el correo que nada,” where a messenger swam downstream with mail secured in a cotton handkerchief, sometimes using a balsa log to rest and stopping at huts for food and shelter. Humboldt confirmed the reliability of this system, having received mail sent this way in Paris, and noted that groups of people also traveled the river in this manner. After Cuenca, where they attended bullfights, the travelers proceeded to Loja to study the cinchona tree, the source of quinine. They spent nearly three weeks exploring the Amazon headwaters near Jaen, Peru, then crossed the Andes again near Cajamarca, where he spent five days visiting relics linked to the Inca ruler’s capture and execution by the Spanish, including the supposed execution stone and the room where Atahualpa offered gold for his freedom.. At this point, Humboldt’s measurement of Earth’s magnetic intensity provided a benchmark for future geomagnetic studies, as they crossed the magnetic equator. By October 1802, after extensive travel in the Andes, the expedition reached sea level at Trujillo and arrived in Lima on 23 October 1802.

Humboldt’s impressions of Lima were largely unfavorable. In a letter dated January 18, 1803, addressed to the Governor of Jaén, he described Lima as having declined significantly compared to other South American cities such as Buenos Aires, Santiago de Chile, and Arequipa. He observed an absence of well-furnished homes and well-dressed women, attributing the city’s poverty to economic conditions and widespread gambling. Public amusements were limited to a theater and an attractive bullring. Humboldt noted that nighttime travel by carriage was hindered by stray dogs and donkey carcasses obstructing the streets. He criticized the prevalence of gambling and family separation, which he believed disrupted social cohesion, and remarked on the lack of large social gatherings. According to Humboldt, the atmosphere in Lima was marked by a cold egotism and general indifference to the suffering of others. He also commented on Lima’s relative isolation, stating it felt more remote from the rest of Peru than London was. During his two-month stay in Lima, Humboldt focused on preparing his scientific collections for shipment by sea. He also observed the transit of Mercury, and became interested in guano. The guano, which came from the excrement of seabirds, was collected by the natives on the islands off the coast. He recognized its significance as a fertilizer, noting that its value had been understood by ancient Peruvians for centuries.

During Humboldt’s stay in Peru, he distinguished himself from previous travelers and colonial figures by recognizing and appreciating the achievements of the region’s ancient civilizations. The Spanish conquest under Francisco Pizarro had resulted in the destruction of the Inca Empire after 1532, with significant cultural assets being looted or destroyed. The Spanish and missionaries viewed the heritage of earlier civilizations with little respect, dismissing their artifacts and monuments as pagan relics and prioritizing the spread of Christianity. Despite these losses, many remnants of the Inca civilization persisted. Humboldt noted the survival of the Inca language, which he had studied in Quito and found to be widespread and expressive, especially among lovers. Physical traces of the Inca presence were visible in the extensive road network, which Humboldt encountered near Cuenca and other locations.

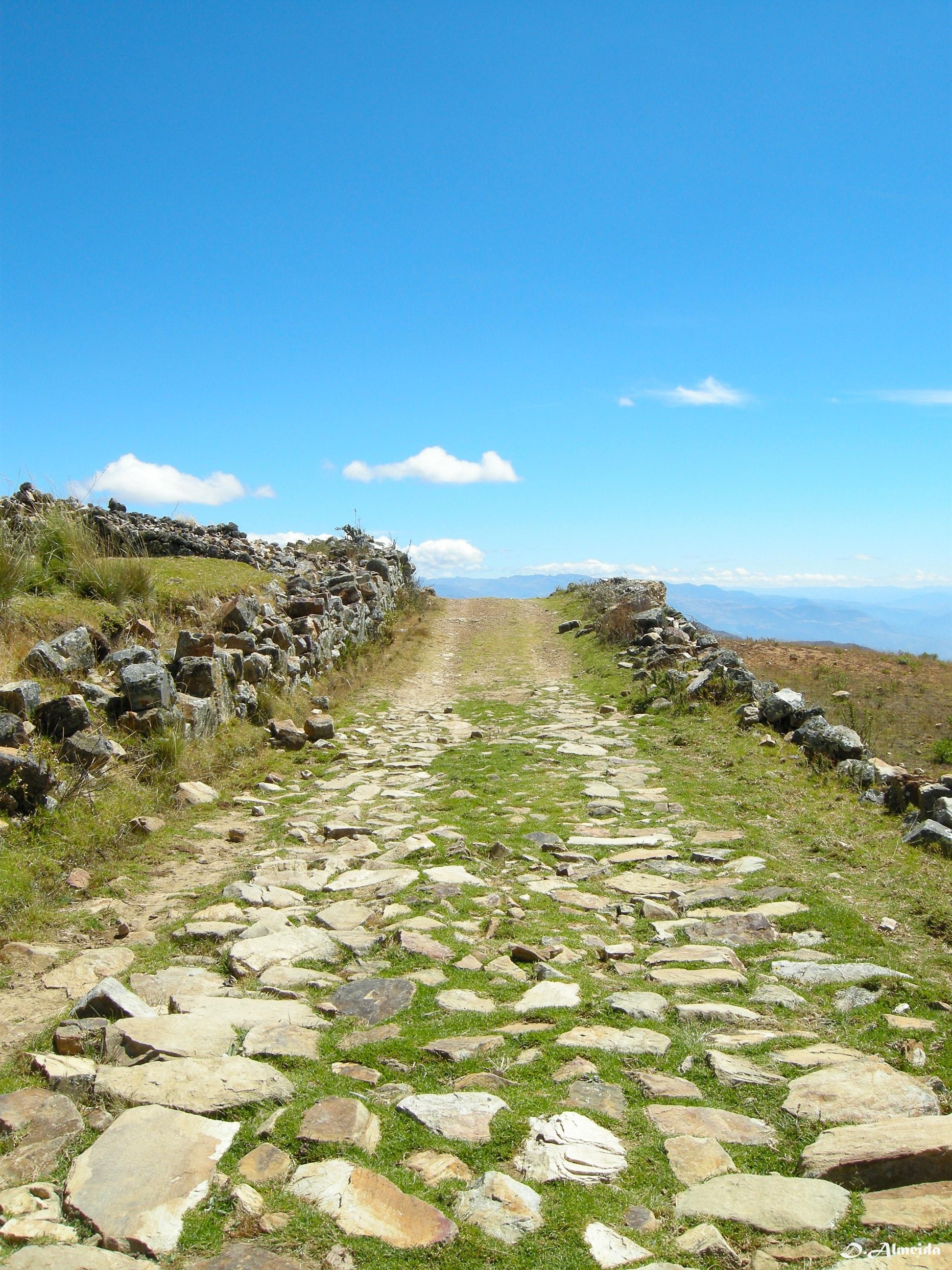
Remnants of a former inca road near Lima

The Inca roads traversed difficult terrain, rising to great heights and incorporating stairways to overcome steep inclines. As the Incas lacked wheels and horses, travel was on foot or with llamas, and rest stops provided food and shelter along the routes. The Spanish, finding these roads unsuitable for their horses, often dismantled them for building materials. However, in remote areas, sections of the original roads survived. At 4,374 yards (4,000 m) in Assuay (now Páramo de Azuay), Humboldt examined the ruins of the palace of Inca Tupac Yupanqui, including a site he believed to be an observatory. Humboldt also encountered descendants of the Inca nobility, including a young man who maintained a belief in the restoration of the Inca Empire and recounted legends of a hidden golden garden beneath the ruins. The descendant expressed reluctance to seek the treasure, citing a resigned awareness that any gold discovered would be seized by outsiders. Through these observations and encounters, Humboldt documented the enduring presence of Inca culture and the legacy of pre-Columbian civilizations in Peru.

=== Mexico (New Spain) (1803–1804) ===
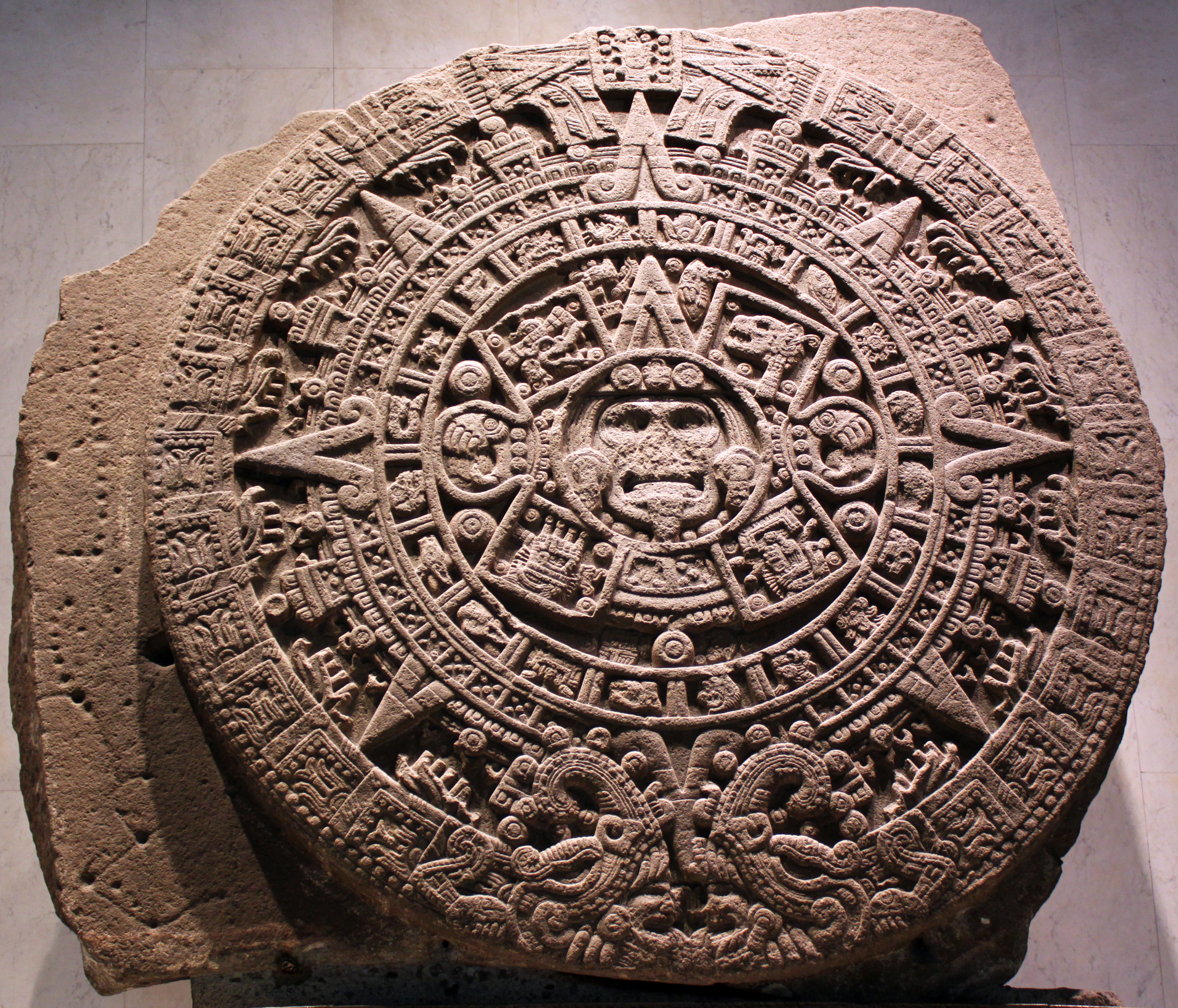
Stone of the Fifth Sun, known as the Aztec calendar, Ollin Tonatiuh anagoria

On Christmas Eve, Humboldt and his party departed from Callao for Guayaquil, traveling slowly along the coast. During the voyage, Humboldt took regular oceanographic measurements of the cold current along the Peruvian coast. Although local fishermen had known of this current for centuries, Humboldt was the first to systematically study its properties. Over time, despite his protests, this current came to be widely known as the Humboldt Current, and it remains a principal geographical feature associated with his name. On February 15, 1803, Humboldt sailed from Guayaquil to Mexico. Even two hundred miles offshore, he heard the eruption of Cotopaxi. After thirty-three days at sea, the ship approached Acapulco. Humboldt discovered that standard charts had mislocated the port, a significant error given Acapulco’s importance as a hub for Spanish Pacific trade. On March 22, 1803, the ship anchored, and Humboldt began immediate astronomical observations to determine the port’s precise location. He confirmed that Acapulco was situated up to five miles west of its position on existing maps, prompting necessary revisions to the cartography of New Spain.

Acapulco, with its natural harbor, had been settled by indigenous peoples for thousands of years and later established as a port by Hernán Cortés in 1523. By Humboldt’s visit, the city had diminished in significance, with a small population and little commercial activity. Upon arrival, Humboldt used his instruments to correct geographic errors caused by local currents and earthquakes, further improving navigation and mapping accuracy. Humboldt’s primary reason for coming to New Spain was to secure passage to the Philippines, but he viewed Mexico as a vital subject for study. At the start of the nineteenth century, New Spain was a populous and prosperous colony, contributing significantly to Spain’s economy through silver, gold, and agricultural production. Humboldt, holding a royal passport, enjoyed unprecedented access to official records and facilities, enabling him to study the country’s economic and political structures thoroughly.

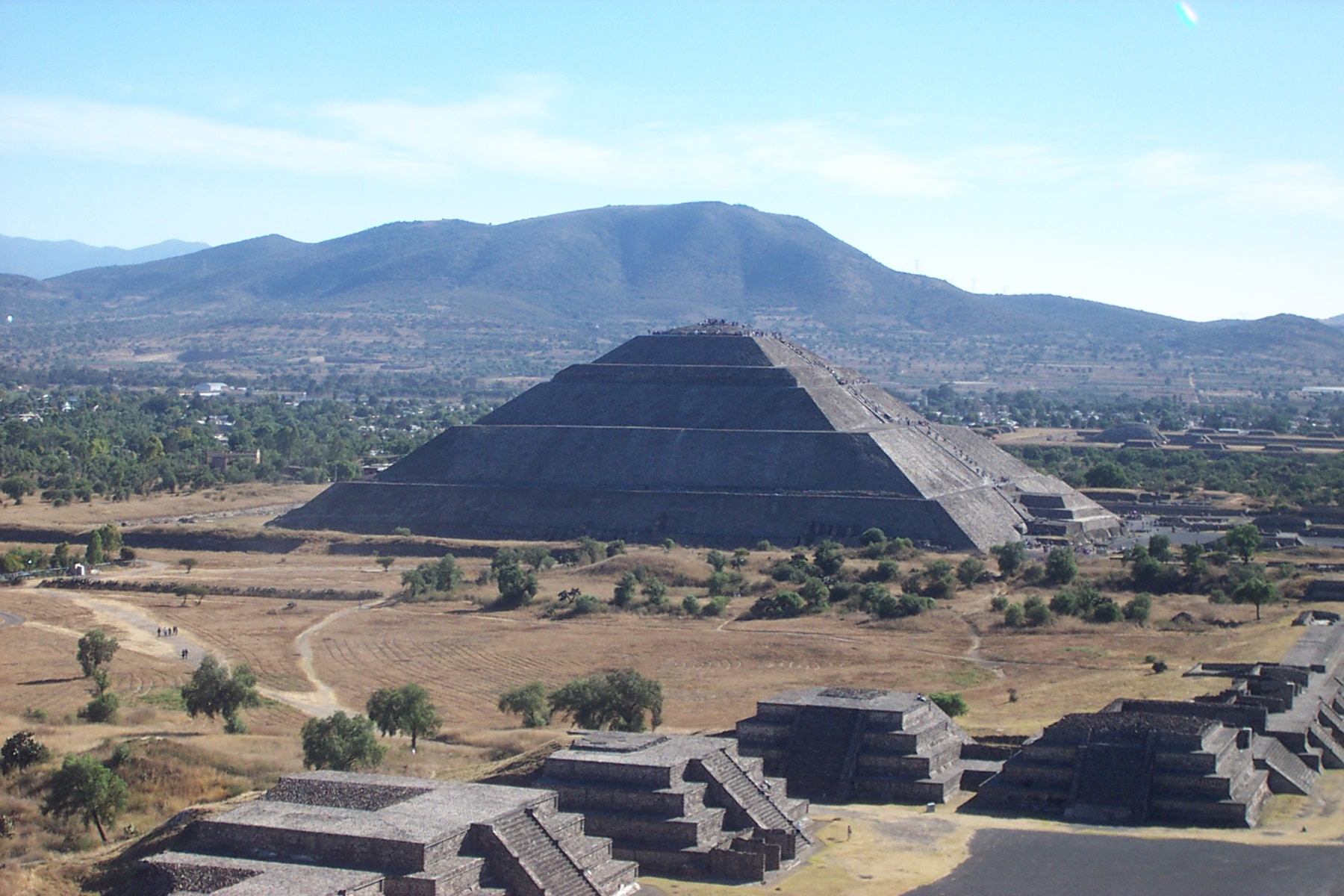
Pyramid of the Sun

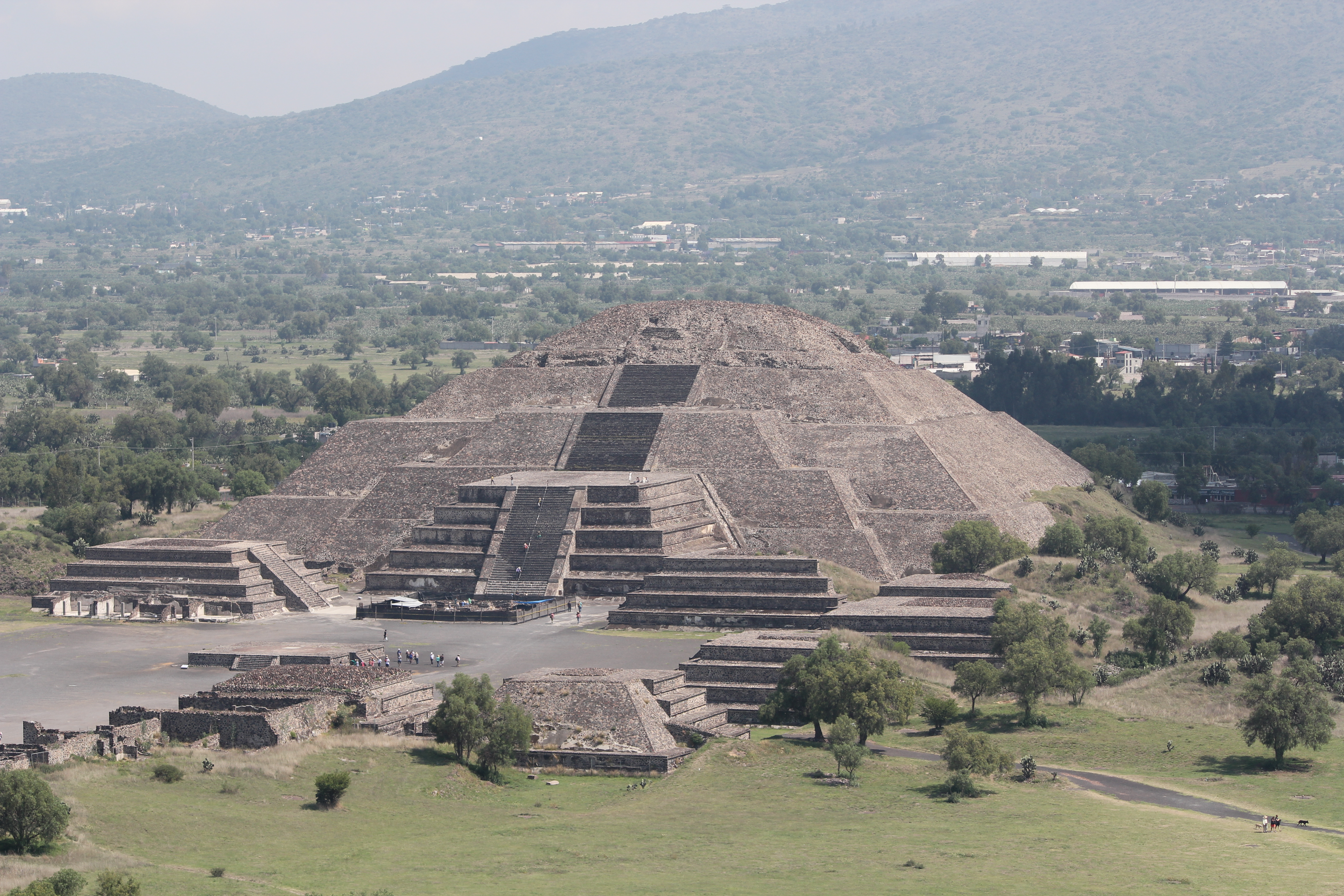
Pyramid of the Moon

In early April, Humboldt and his companions prepared for their journey to Mexico City, enduring harsh conditions as they crossed the Sierra Madre del Sur, where temperatures reached 104 degrees Fahrenheit and the path was dusty and rocky. At Chilpancingo, they experienced a cooler climate and the scent of pine. Throughout the journey, Humboldt meticulously charted their route, using instruments to record geologic and geographic data. His systematic surveying produced the first geological cross-section based on precise instrument readings, a significant innovation in geological science. The group next visited Taxco, a renowned mining town famous for its silver mines. Humboldt observed the extensive mining operations and learned about the legendary fortunes and losses of miners like Jose de Laborde. He studied local mining techniques and later published critical observations in his "Political Essay on the Kingdom of New Spain," condemning the harsh treatment of indigenous laborers and outdated, dangerous mining practices. Humboldt was struck by the poor conditions underground, where men and children worked in hazardous environments.

Taxco’s mining traditions persisted into Humboldt's time, but he noted improvements in workers' well-being compared to earlier periods. The town preserved memories of Humboldt’s visit, including the house where he stayed and the garden where he spent evenings. From Taxco, the party traveled through mountainous terrain to Cuernavaca and then to a vantage point above the Valley of Mexico, where Humboldt admired the lakes, ancient ruins, and the city of Mexico itself. He regarded Mexico City as a magnificent metropolis, rich in history and architecture, and was warmly received by local society. Humboldt and his party were provided with comfortable lodgings and given official support by the Viceroy, Don Jose de Iturrigaray, who granted them access to archives, mines, plantations, and antiquities. Humboldt found the city’s educational institutions, particularly the School of Mines, to be outstanding in Latin America. He contributed to a geology textbook, which became the first of its kind in the Americas to bear his name as co-author.

At the central square of Mexico City, the Zócalo, Humboldt was introduced to ongoing excavations near the imposing Cathedral. He was particularly inspired by the discovery of Aztec sculptures, most notably the famous Aztec calendar stone. Encountering these artifacts firsthand, Humboldt felt a sense of awe at the evidence of sophisticated ancient civilizations. He saw the Aztec calendar as proof of universal human ingenuity, comparing it to the astronomical achievements of Egypt and China. Humboldt meticulously sketched these sculptures, recognizing their value for understanding pre-Columbian history and science. Humboldt, accompanied by Bonpland and the nobleman Carlos de Montúfar, also traveled to the pyramids of Teotihuacan, located northeast of the capital. There, he marveled at the geometric order and vast scale of the Pyramids of the Sun and the Moon, which he believed were constructed in accordance with astronomical observations. Humboldt measured the heights of these pyramids and studied their orientation, considering how the structures would have appeared a thousand years earlier, adorned with gilded images of gods. He was intrigued by the rubble of sun-baked bricks and pottery found within the pyramids, pondering their original purpose and construction techniques.

Throughout his travels, Humboldt was deeply interested in the daily lives and cultural practices of Mexico’s indigenous peoples. He frequently inquired about local customs, tools, village names, and natural resources, filling his notebooks with details that even his native guide considered too elementary for a scholar. (Note: Humboldt’s relentless questioning—about everything from the use of the metate (a traditional milling stone) to the names of streams and villages—was sometimes misinterpreted as absentmindedness or a lack of expertise. In reality, he was systematically gathering ethnographic and linguistic data, treating everyday knowledge with the same seriousness as scientific observations.) Receiving news from Berlin, Humboldt decided to postpone his plans for a global voyage due to damaged instruments, logistical difficulties, and the urgent pace of scientific progress in Europe. He resolved to remain in Mexico until spring 1804, making the most of his time by conducting local excursions and research. Humboldt’s scientific rigor was evident in his accurate astronomical and barometric measurements, which closely matched later calculations. In August 1803, he departed on an extensive tour, inspecting the Nochistongo canal, an engineering feat designed to protect Mexico City from floods, and collecting fossil remains for European scientists.

At Guanajuato, Humboldt studied the silver mines and geological formations, requiring a special mule train to transport his mineral specimens. He continued to Morelia, noting its less favorable location compared to the ancient Tarascan center at Lake Patzcuaro, and praised the Tarascan people’s craftsmanship. At the crater of Jorullo, a volcano formed in 1759, Humboldt measured volcanic temperatures and studied the rapid development of unique plant life on the lava. Locals attributed the eruption to the actions of missionaries. The journey included an ascent of Nevado de Toluca, where Humboldt studied vegetation zones and compared them to those he had observed in South America, reinforcing his interest in plant geography. The party returned to Mexico City to prepare their specimens for shipment to Europe.

Humboldt’s remaining months were filled with research, teaching, and the completion of detailed maps. He delivered lectures proposing a new system for correlating rock formations, making important contributions to the field of stratigraphy. His focus on mineralogical rather than paleontological criteria distinguished his work from that of English geologist William Smith. Humboldt also advanced the understanding of volcanic activity in Mexico, observing the alignment of volcanoes as evidence of structural weaknesses in the earth’s crust. His observations supported the theory that volcanic belts were related to tectonic fissures. The Humboldt party departed Mexico City on January 20, 1804, heading for Puebla and Veracruz, taking with them a wealth of scientific material and observations.

On March 7, 1804, Humboldt departed from Veracruz, sailing to Havana to recover the scientific collections he had stored there more than three years earlier for safekeeping. Previously, when Humboldt attempted to join Baudin in Lima, it appeared he had abandoned any intention of traveling to the northern regions of the American continent. In late November 1802, he wrote to the Institut National in Paris, stating his hope to return to Europe through Mexico and Cuba by the following autumn. In his letter, Humboldt emphasized his focus on preserving and publishing his manuscripts and expressed a strong desire to be in Paris. However, his decision to delay his return and visit the United States emerged at the last moment. This change was likely inspired by his deep admiration for the American President, Thomas Jefferson, (Note: Like Humboldt, Jefferson was interested in all sciences — including horticulture, mathematics, meteorology and geography.) whom Humboldt felt compelled to meet before leaving the New World. His interest was further heightened by curiosity about Jefferson’s initiatives for exploring the American West.

=== United States (1804) ===
On 29 April 1804, Alexander von Humboldt, accompanied by Bonpland and Monttfar, embarked from Havana on the Spanish frigate Concepcion en route to Philadelphia. They endured a week-long storm in the Bahama Straits, raising concerns for the safety of their scientific collections. After 24 days, they reached the calm waters of Delaware, where they had their first views of the United States. The landscape featured low, forest-covered shores punctuated with marshland, and as they neared Philadelphia, attractive farmhouses came into sight amidst the forest clearings. However, upon closer approach, the waterfront revealed an unsightly scene of wooden warehouses and refuse. Behind this façade lay a well-organized city of 75,000 residents, reminiscent of European towns. Its cobblestone streets lined with poplar trees, elegant three-storey red-brick houses, and well-furnished interiors stood in stark contrast to the initial impression.

The main public building, aside from the State House, was Philosophic Hall, home to the American Philosophical Society, which played a crucial role in arranging for Humboldt's visit. Despite Philadelphia losing its capital status to Washington, it remained the cultural and scientific heart of the burgeoning republic. Humboldt and his companions were accommodated in an inn near the harbor on Market Street, and their arrival was promptly covered in the local newspapers. Relf's Philadelphia Gazette and Daily Advertiser reported that "Baron de Homboldt arrived in this city on Wednesday night." Meanwhile, Humboldt himself wasted no time in getting in touch with the President. He wrote the following in French on May 24:

Arrived from Mexico on the blessed ground of this republic, whose executive powers were placed in your hands, I feel it my pleasant duty to present my respects and express my high admiration for your writings, your actions, and the liberalism of your ideas, which have inspired me from my earliest youth. I flatter myself in the expectation of expressing my sentiments orally to you, remitting at the same time the attached parcel, which my friend the Consul of the United States in Havana asked me to send to you[...] For moral reasons I could not resist seeing the United States and enjoying the consoling aspects of a people who under stand the precious gift of Liberty. I hope to be able to present my personal respects and admiration to one who contemplates philosophically the troubles of two continents. [...] I am quite unaware whether you know of me already through my work on galvanism and my publications in the memoirs of the Institut National in Paris. As a friend of science, you will excuse the indulgence of my admiration. I would love to talk to you about a subject that you have treated so ingeniously in your work on Virginia, the teeth of mammoth which we too dis covered in the Andes[...]

— Alexander von Humboldt

During his wait for a response from President Jefferson, Humboldt was honored by the American Philosophical Society, of which Jefferson was the President. This society, founded in 1743 by Benjamin Franklin, was a center for scientific inquiry in the Republic. Humboldt mingled with members such as Dr. Caspar Wistar, known for advocating compulsory vaccination; Benjamin Smith Barton, a botany and Native American culture expert; and Dr. Benjamin Rush, a Declaration signatory interested in the medicinal properties of cinchona bark. Humboldt's companion, Charles Willson Peale, a painter and lay scientist, introduced him to his unique museum, dubbed the "School of Wisdom." The museum held an eclectic array of specimens, including stuffed animals, bizarre artifacts, and a collection of paintings for sale. Peale also showcased a device called the physiognotrace, which allowed individuals to trace silhouettes, and Humboldt participated in creating a series of his own profiles.

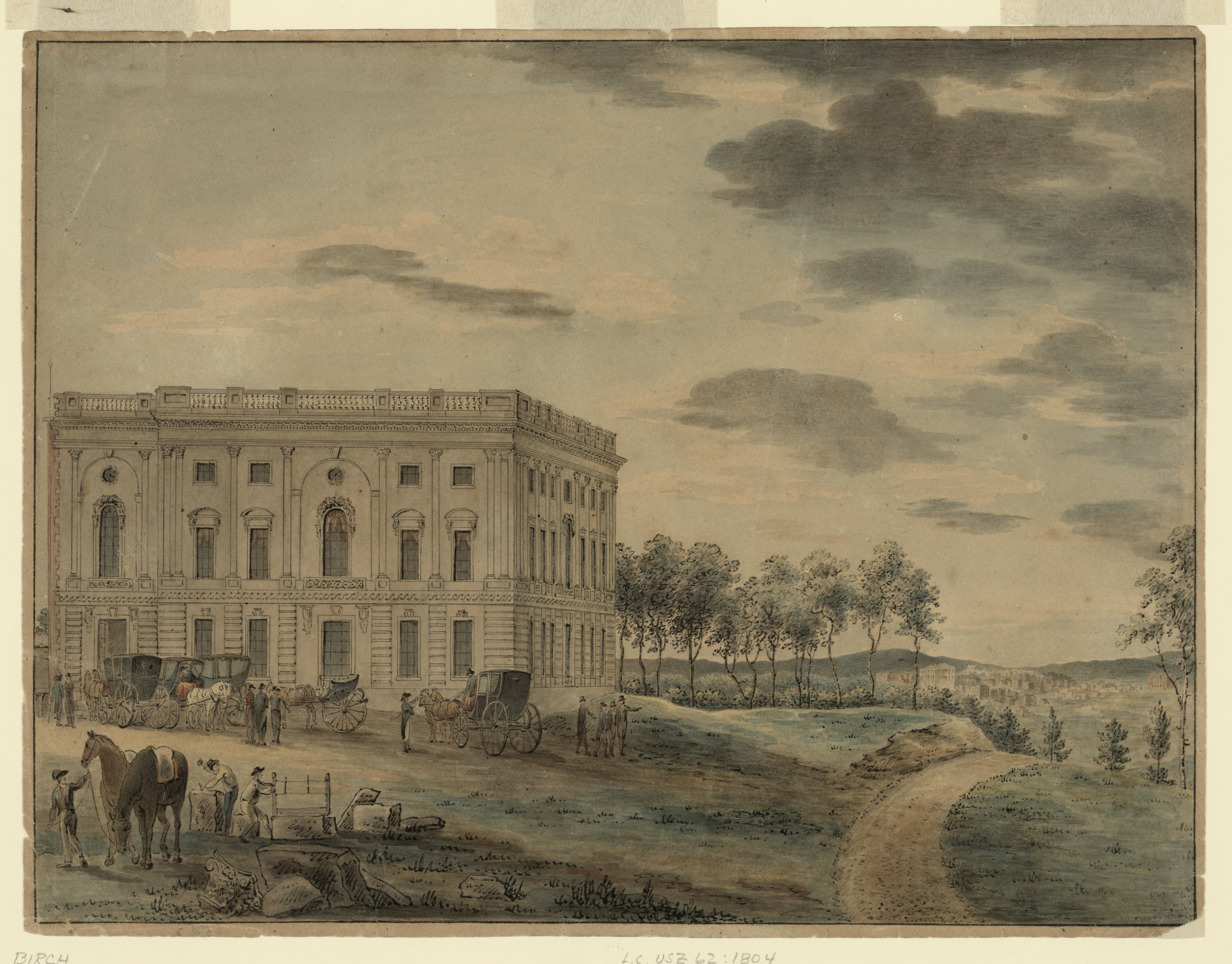
A view of the Capitol of Washington before it was burnt down by the British painting by William Russell Birch c. 1800

On 1 June, Humboldt and his party arrived in Washington, which had become the United States capital in 1800. The city was still under construction, with fewer than 5,000 inhabitants and about 800 houses clustered around the Capitol, the President’s residence, and the Navy Yard along the Potomac River. The Executive Mansion, where Humboldt was invited to lunch with President Thomas Jefferson, was also incomplete and surrounded by unfinished grounds. Jefferson’s study, serving as his Cabinet room, was filled with a variety of personal and official items, including his books, maps, gardening tools, and a cage for his favorite mockingbird. It was in this space that Jefferson and Humboldt engaged in detailed discussions.

Jefferson, at sixty-one, was known for his unpretentious lifestyle and devotion to family. The luncheon, attended by figures such as Charles Willson Peale, was informal, focusing on topics like natural history and international customs rather than politics. Jefferson and Humboldt quickly developed mutual respect, sharing scientific interests and political ideals. Jefferson was knowledgeable in various scientific fields, having conducted meteorological studies, experimented with agricultural techniques, and designed a plow. He was well-acquainted with the works of leading European scientists and demonstrated expertise in astronomy and paleontology. He offered Humboldt access to his Washington residence and invited him to visit Monticello in Virginia.

During his visit, Humboldt observed Jefferson in private moments, including scenes of the President playing with his grandchildren. Jefferson sought detailed information from Humboldt about the newly acquired frontier with Mexico, following the Louisiana Purchase, which had doubled the size of the United States. With little American knowledge about the new territories, Jefferson valued Humboldt’s maps and statistical data, which were particularly relevant to the government’s ambitions for westward expansion and exploration, such as the Lewis and Clark expedition.

Humboldt was widely entertained in Washington, visiting various sites and meeting prominent Americans, including James Madison, Albert Gallatin, Gilbert Stuart, and William Thornton. He impressed those he met with his intelligence and breadth of knowledge. After returning to Philadelphia on 18 July, Humboldt prepared for his return to Europe. He secured necessary travel documents from the British Consul and Secretary of State James Madison, reclaimed his maps, and settled his accounts. Humboldt expressed admiration for the United States in his correspondence, praising its liberty and potential while also criticizing the persistence of slavery, which he regarded as incompatible with true justice and lasting prosperity. He expressed hope for the eventual abolition of slavery and a desire to return to America. On 30 June 1804, Humboldt, Bonpland, and Montufar departed with their scientific specimens aboard the French frigate La Favorite, sailing from the Delaware River and reaching the open sea by 9 July 1804, thus concluding Humboldt’s American expedition.

== Aftermath ==
After returning to France in August 1804, Alexander von Humboldt and Aimé Bonpland arrived in Bordeaux after a swift Atlantic crossing. Their return after six years abroad was marked by the need to adjust to changed circumstances and reintegrate into European life. During quarantine, Humboldt wrote to the Institut National in Paris, informing them of his safe arrival. This news caused surprise, as rumors of his death had circulated in Europe. Humboldt reached Paris in late August, looking healthy and energetic. He was warmly welcomed by friends and family, with accounts noting he appeared unchanged by his long absence. Parisian society celebrated Humboldt as a hero. He was honored at scientific meetings and social gatherings, gaining widespread public attention for his South American explorations.

His collections and drawings, exhibited at the Jardin des Plantes, attracted large crowds. Within six weeks, the Institut National held a special meeting where Humboldt presented his scientific results, receiving enthusiastic applause. In mid-October, Humboldt presented the first reports of his journey at a meeting of the Institut National des Sciences et Arts, a French government organisation created in 1795 to promote science, the beaux arts, and literature. The meeting was crowded and highly anticipated. In October of that year, the inaugural exhibition of Humboldt's botanical collection was inaugurated at the Jardin des Plantes, where it met with considerable acclaim. Concurrently, the Bureau of Longitude Studies and the Observatory were undertaking a comprehensive review of his extensive barometric and astronomical measurements. Furthermore, artists had been commissioned to commence the replication of his botanical sketches and illustrations of ancient Indian monuments.

At this time, Napoleon Bonaparte was the only person in Europe with greater fame than Humboldt. Their sole meeting was unsuccessful, with Napoleon responding coldly, possibly viewing Humboldt as a politically suspect foreigner. Despite this, Napoleon granted a pension to Bonpland but later attempted to expel Humboldt from Paris on suspicion of espionage. Paris, despite political changes since Humboldt’s departure, was now the leading center of science, offering exceptional resources and collaborators. Humboldt chose to remain, preferring Paris’s intellectual and social environment over Berlin, which he considered unappealing. He immersed himself in work, organizing his extensive collections and distributing specimens to various institutions. Bonpland kept the most complete set of plant specimens, with other collections sent to major European botanical gardens. Humboldt’s dedication to processing and publishing his scientific findings required several years of intense effort.

During their American expedition, Alexander von Humboldt and Aimé Bonpland encountered numerous challenges and hardships, many of which were described in Humboldt’s Voyage aux régions équinoxiales du Nouveau Continent and related works. Travel conditions were often extremely difficult due to the geography, climate, and lack of infrastructure across Spanish America in the early nineteenth century. The expedition frequently navigated dangerous and remote terrain. In the Orinoco basin, they traveled by canoe for weeks through dense rainforest and flooded savannahs, contending with swarms of mosquitoes and biting insects. Humboldt described suffering from fevers, likely caused by malaria or other tropical diseases, which affected both himself and Bonpland. They endured intense heat and humidity, particularly during their exploration of the Llanos and Amazonian lowlands.

Food supplies were often insufficient or spoiled. Humboldt recounted periods of near-starvation, notably during their journey up the Cassiquiare Canal, when the group survived on minimal rations and local wild foods. Water was sometimes scarce or unsafe, and they risked illness from contaminated sources. The explorers faced physical dangers from local wildlife, including venomous snakes, jaguars, and crocodiles. Humboldt detailed an encounter with electric eels near Calabozo, where they observed the animals’ ability to stun horses during local fishing practices. Mountain ascents posed their own hazards. While climbing Chimborazo, Humboldt and Bonpland experienced altitude sickness, extreme cold, and exhaustion. Humboldt recorded severe headaches, nosebleeds, and difficulty breathing at high elevations.

== Contributions to Science ==
Alexander von Humboldt’s scientific achievements are notable for their scope, empirical rigor, and transformative impact across the natural sciences. His American expedition (1799–1804) produced a vast array of new data and observations, which he synthesized in a remarkable body of published work. Humboldt’s enduring reputation is grounded in his relentless fieldwork, his innovative methods of data visualization, and above all in his vision of nature as a unified and dynamic system.

His contributions to plant geography are evident in his Essai sur la géographie des plantes (1805), which introduced the idea that plant distributions are determined by environmental factors such as climate, elevation, and soil. (Note: The plant material resulting from the expedition comprised approximately 60,000 specimens, representing approximately 6,000 species. Of these, more than 3,000 to 3,500 were previously unknown to science.) This groundbreaking work was based on his ascent of equatorial mountains like Chimborazo and Pichincha, where he meticulously recorded changes in vegetation corresponding to altitude and temperature. Humboldt’s iconic “Chimborazo profile” visually mapped plant zones along the mountain’s slopes, integrating botanical, meteorological, and physical data. By demonstrating that the same climatic zones could produce similar vegetation types on different continents, Humboldt laid the foundations for modern biogeography and ecology, moving beyond Linnaean taxonomy to a dynamic understanding of the relationship between organisms and their environment. The methods and concepts presented in the Essai were further developed in later works, including Plantes équinoxiales which catalogued the thousands of plant specimens collected during his travels, many of them previously unknown to science.

In the field of geology and climatology, Humboldt’s Recueil d’observations de zoologie et d’anatomie comparée and his monograph on the geology and climatology of South America offered comprehensive new perspectives. He was the first to produce geological cross-sections based on quantitative measurements, using barometric readings and the compass to map the structure and composition of mountain ranges and volcanic regions. His investigations of the Andes and Mexican volcanoes, including detailed studies of eruptions such as that of Jorullo, fostered a new understanding of vulcanism. Humboldt’s observations showed that volcanoes are often aligned along fissures in the earth’s crust, helping to shift geological thought away from Werner’s “neptunist” model toward a synthesis that recognized the role of internal heat and tectonic forces. His rigorous meteorological observations, employing thermometers, barometers, hygrometers, and magnetic instruments, produced the first reliable data on temperature, pressure, humidity, and magnetic phenomena across the Americas. Humboldt introduced the concept of isothermal lines—lines connecting points of equal mean temperature—making possible global comparisons of climate and advancing the study of climatology and physical geography. He also coined technical terms such as “isodynamics,” “isoclines,” and “magnetic storm,” and was the first to describe the magnetic equator.

Humboldt’s mapping and cartographic achievements set new standards for accuracy and integration. In Recueil d’observations astronomiques, d’opérations trigonométriques et de mesures barométriques, he presented maps that combined astronomical observations for latitude and longitude, triangulation, and barometric measurements of elevation. His maps of the Orinoco River, the Andes, the Valley of Mexico, and other regions provided unprecedented detail and clarity. In Mexico, he oversaw the production of a comprehensive map that synthesized political, economic, ethnographic, and physical information, setting a new standard for thematic maps.

Humboldt’s Essai politique sur le royaume de la Nouvelle-Espagne (Political Essay on the Kingdom of New Spain) and Essai politique sur l’île de Cuba (Political Essay on the Island of Cuba) exemplify his approach to regional geography. These works combined exhaustive statistical data with economic, social, and physical analysis, offering the first modern regional studies of Mexico and Cuba. In Mexico, Humboldt’s assessments of mining resources, particularly silver, drew international attention and had significant economic repercussions. His Cuban essay was notable for its forceful condemnation of slavery. In both cases, Humboldt’s integration of field observations, statistical analysis, and critical commentary created a template for future regional and economic geography.

== Bibliography ==
- Hein, Wolfgang-Hagen; et al. (Alexander von Humboldt: Leben und Werk) (1985). Humboldt und Frankreich. Frankfurt am Main: Weisbecker. ISBN 3921037557.
- Beck, Hanno; et al. (Alexander von Humboldt: Leben und Werk) (1985). Die Geographie Alexander von Humboldts. Frankfurt am Main: Weisbecker. ISBN 3921037557.
- Rawding, Charles (2017). "Nature and the legacy of Alexander von Humboldt". Geography. 102 (2). JSTOR 45154592.
- Schrodt, Franziska; Santos, Maria; Bailey, Joseph; Field, Richard (2019). "Challenges and opportunities for biogeography—What can we still learn from von Humboldt?". Journal of Biogeography. 46 (8). JSTOR 26786762.
- von Humboldt, Alexander (2004). Oliver Lubrich, Ottmar Ette (ed.). Vues des Cordillères et Monumens des Peuples Indigènes de l´Amérique [Ansichten der Kordilleren und Monumente der eingeborenen Völker Amerikas] (in German). Translated by Kalscheuer, Claudia. Frankfurt am Main: Eichborn. ISBN 3821845384.
- von Humboldt, Alexander (1814a). Reise in die Aequinoctial-Gegenden des neuen Continents in den Jahren 1799, 1800, 1801, 1802, 1803 und 1804 [Personal narrative of travels to the equinoctial regions of the New Continent during the years 1799-1804]. Vol. I. Translated by Williams, Helen Maria. London: Longman.
- von Humboldt, Alexander (1814b). Reise in die Aequinoctial-Gegenden des neuen Continents in den Jahren 1799, 1800, 1801, 1802, 1803 und 1804 [Personal narrative of travels to the equinoctial regions of the New Continent during the years 1799-1804]. Vol. II. Translated by Williams, Helen Maria. London: Longman.
- von Humboldt, Alexander (1818). Reise in die Aequinoctial-Gegenden des neuen Continents in den Jahren 1799, 1800, 1801, 1802, 1803 und 1804 [Personal narrative of travels to the equinoctial regions of the New Continent during the years 1799-1804]. Vol. III. Translated by Williams, Helen Maria. London: Longman.
- von Humboldt, Alexander (1819). Reise in die Aequinoctial-Gegenden des neuen Continents in den Jahren 1799, 1800, 1801, 1802, 1803 und 1804 [Personal narrative of travels to the equinoctial regions of the New Continent during the years 1799-1804]. Vol. IV. Translated by Williams, Helen Maria. London: Longman.
- von Humboldt, Alexander (1821). Reise in die Aequinoctial-Gegenden des neuen Continents in den Jahren 1799, 1800, 1801, 1802, 1803 und 1804. Vol. V. Translated by Williams, Helen Maria. London: Longman.
- von Humboldt, Alexander (1826). Reise in die Aequinoctial-Gegenden des neuen Continents in den Jahren 1799, 1800, 1801, 1802, 1803 und 1804 [Personal narrative of travels to the equinoctial regions of the New Continent during the years 1799-1804]. Vol. VI. Translated by Williams, Helen Maria. London: Longman.
- von Humboldt, Alexander (1829). Reise in die Aequinoctial-Gegenden des neuen Continents in den Jahren 1799, 1800, 1801, 1802, 1803 und 1804. Vol. VII. Translated by Williams, Helen Maria. London: Longman.
- Botting, Douglas (1973). Humboldt and the Cosmos. London: Sphere. OCLC 1310730851.
- Helferich, Gerard (2004). Humboldt's Cosmos : Alexander von Humboldt and the Latin American journey that changed the way we see the world. New York: Gotham Books. ISBN 1592400523.
- Barth, Reinhard (2009). Alexander von Humboldt: Abenteurer, Forscher, Universalgenie. Berlin: Berliner Taschenbuch Verlag. ISBN 9783833350283.
- Kellner, L. (1963). Alexander von Humboldt. London: Oxford University Press.
- von Humboldt, Alexander (1964). Adolf Meyer-Abich (ed.). Vom Orinoko zum Amazonas: Reise in die Äquinoktial-Gegenden des neuen Kontinents. Wiesbaden: Brockhaus.
- De Terra, Helmut (1955). Humboldt the Life and Times of Alexander von Humboldt 1769-1859. New York: Alfred A. Knopf.
- von Humboldt, Alexander (1969) [1856]. The island of Cuba. New York: Greenwood.
- Wulf, Andrea (2015). The Invention of Nature: Alexander von Humboldt's New World. New York: Alfred A. Knopf. ISBN 038535066X.
- Lack, Walter (2009). Alexander von Humboldt and the botanical exploration of the Americas. New York: Prestel. ISBN 3791341421.
