= Hippeastrum angustifolium =

Scientific classification
- Kingdom: Plantae
- Clade: Tracheophytes
- Clade: Angiosperms
- Clade: Monocots
- Order: Asparagales
- Family: Amaryllidaceae
- Subfamily: Amaryllidoideae
- Genus: Hippeastrum
- Species: H. angustifolium

Binomial name
- Hippeastrum angustifolium Pax

Synonyms
- Amaryllis angustifolia (Pax) Traub & Uphof; Sprekelia spectabilis Hoehne

Species of flowering plant

Hippeastrum angustifolium is a bulbous perennial in the family Amaryllidaceae, native to an area from SE Brazil to Paraguay and NE Argentina. It can grow to 60 cm tall.

== Taxonomy ==
Described by Ferdinand Albin Pax in 1890.

== Bibliography ==
- Pax, Ferdinand Albin. "Beiträge zur Kenntnis der Amaryllidaceae". In Engler (1890), pp. 318–337.
- Engler, Adolf, ed. (1890). Botanische Jahrbücher für Systematik, Pflanzengeschichte und Pflanzengeographie. Vol. 11. Leipzig: Engelmann.
- The International Plant Names Index H. angustifolium.
- GBIF: Hippeastrum angustifolium
