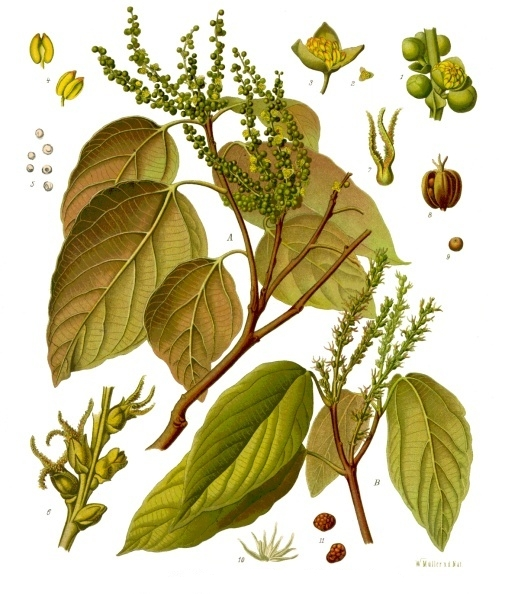
- Kamala tree (M. philippensis)
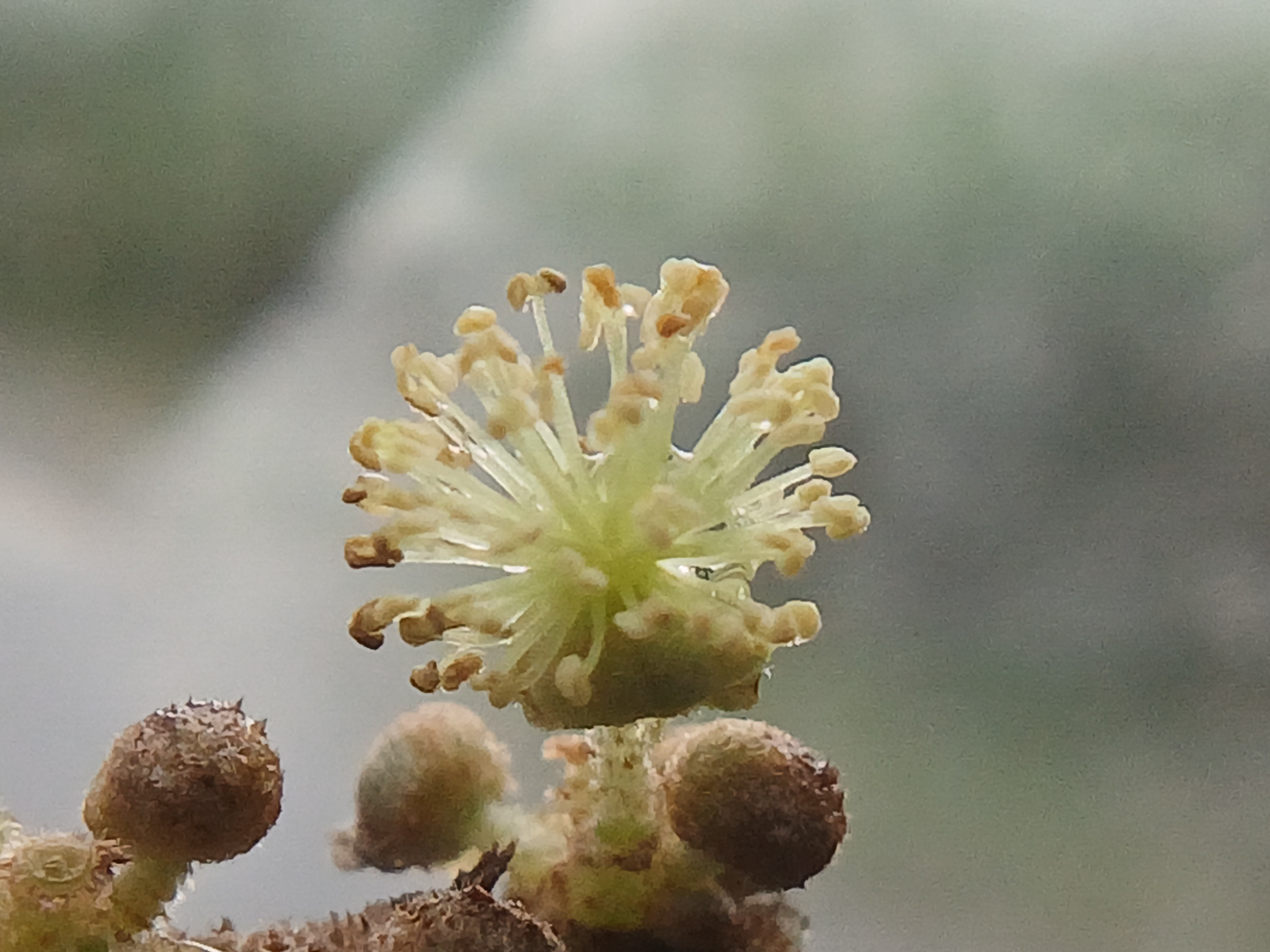
- flower of Mallotus sp.

Scientific classification
- Kingdom: Plantae
- Clade: Embryophytes
- Clade: Tracheophytes
- Clade: Angiosperms
- Clade: Eudicots
- Clade: Rosids
- Order: Malpighiales
- Family: Euphorbiaceae
- Subfamily: Acalyphoideae
- Tribe: Acalypheae
- Subtribe: Rottlerinae
- Genus: Mallotus; Lour.

Synonyms
- Aconceveibum Miq.; Adisa Steud.; Adisca Blume; Axenfeldia Baill.; Boutonia Bojer; Boutonia Bojer ex Baill.; Canschi Adans.; Coccoceras Miq.; Coelodiscus Baill.; Echinocroton F.Muell.; Echinus Lour.; Lasipana Raf.; Neotrewia Pax & K.Hoffm.; Octospermum Airy Shaw; Plagianthera Rchb.f. & Zoll.; Rottlera Willd.; Rottlera Roxb.; Stylanthus Rchb.f. & Zoll.; Trewia L. (Note: One anagram of this genus name yields Wetriaria, another genus of Euphorbiaceae.)

= Mallotus (plant) =

Genus of flowering plants in the spurge family

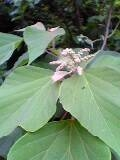
Mallotus japonicus

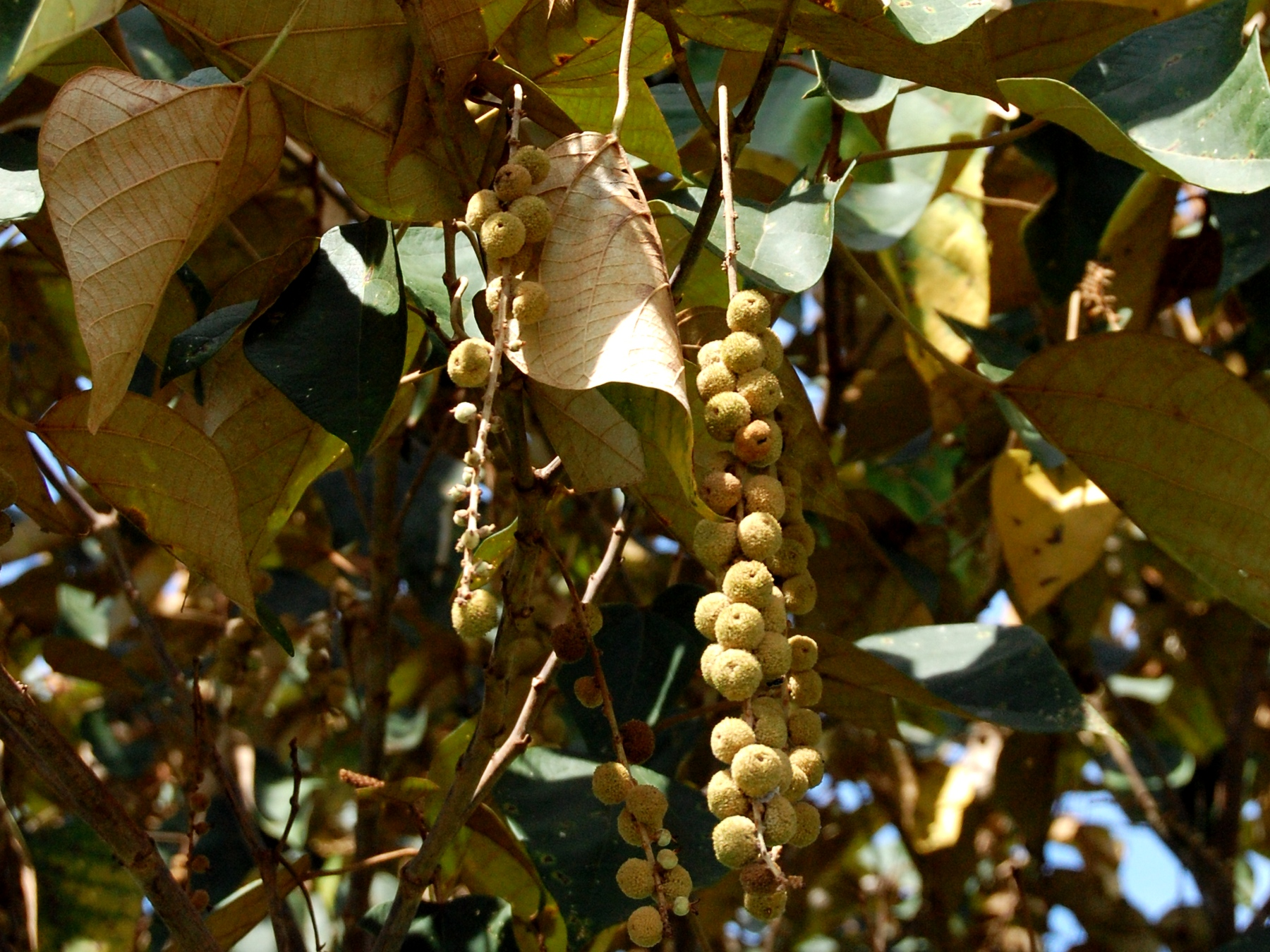
Mallotus macrostachyus

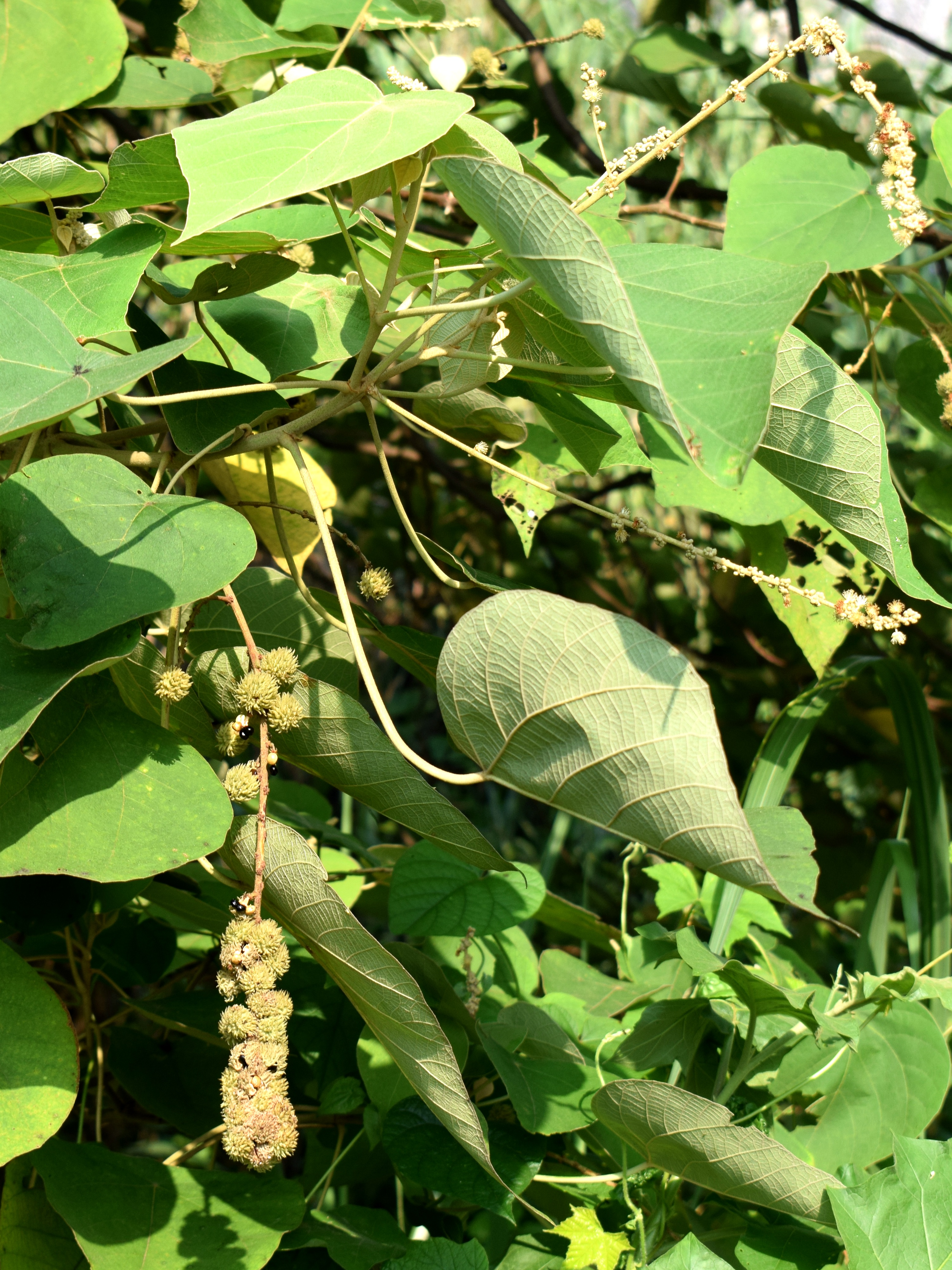
Mallotus mollissimus

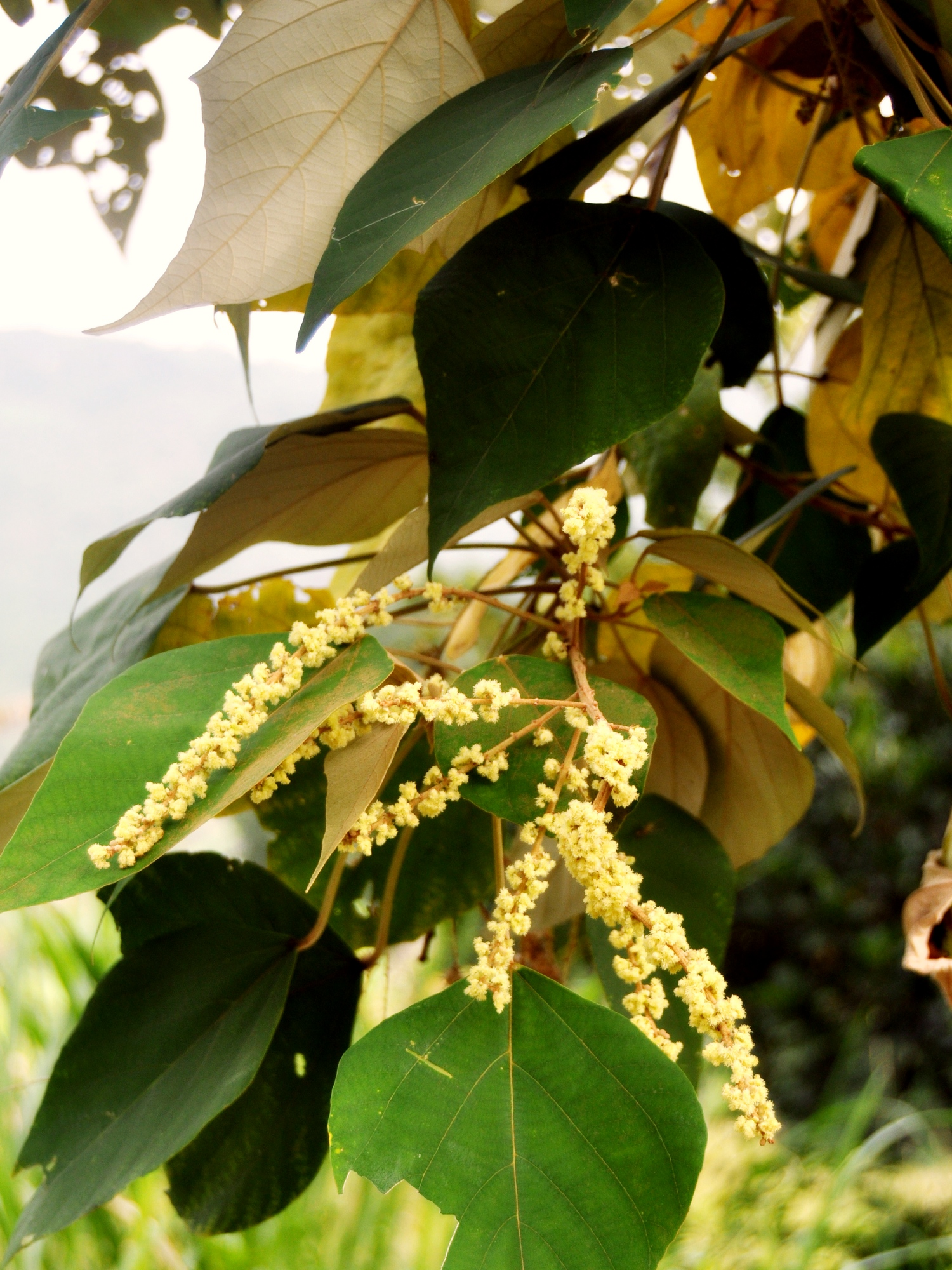
Mallotus paniculatus

Mallotus is a genus of the spurge family Euphorbiaceae first described as a genus in 1790. Two species (M. oppositifolius and M. subulatus) are found in tropical Africa and Madagascar, while all others are found in East Asia, the Indian Subcontinent, Southeast Asia, eastern Australia, and certain islands of the western Pacific. The genus has about 150 species of dioecious trees or shrubs.

== Fossil record ==
Mallotus macrofossils have been recovered from the late Zanclean stage of Pliocene sites in Pocapaglia, Italy.

== Uses ==
Mallotus species are used as food plants by the larvae of some Lepidoptera species including Endoclita malabaricus. The Kamala tree (Mallotus philippensis) has seed capsules which are the source of a yellow dye (Kamala dye) and were formerly a herbal remedy.

== Species ==
1. Mallotus actinoneurus – S Thailand, W Malaysia
2. Mallotus anomalus – Hainan
3. Mallotus apelta – S China, Vietnam
4. Mallotus atrovirens – SW India
5. Mallotus attenuatus – Papua New Guinea
6. Mallotus aureopunctatus – India
7. Mallotus barbatus – India, Indochina, S China, Malaysia, W Indonesia
8. Mallotus beddomei – SW India
9. Mallotus blumeanus – Java, Sumatra
10. Mallotus brachythyrsus – Sarawak, Kalimantan
11. Mallotus brevipetiolatus – S Thailand, W Malaysia
12. Mallotus calocarpus – S Thailand
13. Mallotus cambodianus – Cambodia
14. Mallotus canii – Vietnam
15. Mallotus caudatus – Borneo
16. Mallotus cauliflorus – Luzon
17. Mallotus chromocarpus – Papua New Guinea
18. Mallotus chuyenii – Vietnam
19. Mallotus claoxyloides- E Australia, Papua New Guinea
20. Mallotus concinnus – Kelantan
21. Mallotus confusus – Philippines
22. Mallotus connatus – Philippines, Borneo
23. Mallotus coudercii – Indochina
24. Mallotus cumingii (Trevia ambigua) – Philippines, Borneo, Sulawesi
25. Mallotus darbyshirei – Papua New Guinea
26. Mallotus decipiens – Bangladesh, Indochina, W Malaysia
27. Mallotus didymochryseus – New Guinea
28. Mallotus discolor – E Australia
29. Mallotus dispar – Indochina, W Malaysia, W Indonesia
30. Mallotus dispersus – N Australia
31. Mallotus distans – S India, Sri Lanka
32. Mallotus dunnii – Fujian
33. Mallotus eberhardtii – Vietnam
34. Mallotus eriocarpus – Sri Lanka, W Malaysia
35. Mallotus eximius – Borneo, W Malaysia
36. Mallotus ficifolius – Queensland
37. Mallotus floribundus – SE Asia, Papuasia
38. Mallotus furetianus – Hainan, China
39. Mallotus fuscescens – Sri Lanka
40. Mallotus garrettii – N Laos, N Thailand
41. Mallotus glabriusculus – Indochina
42. Mallotus glomerulatus – NE Thailand
43. Mallotus grossedentatus – Hainan
44. Mallotus hanheoensis – Vietnam
45. Mallotus havilandii – Sarawak
46. Mallotus hispidospinosus – Thailand, Myanmar
47. Mallotus hymenophyllus – S Thailand
48. Mallotus illudens – S China
49. Mallotus insularum – Maluku, Lesser Sunda Islands
50. Mallotus intercedens – India
51. Mallotus japonicus – Japan, Korea, China, Ryukyu Islands
52. Mallotus khasianus – Assam, Indochina, S China
53. Mallotus kongkandae – Yunnan, N Thailand
54. Mallotus korthalsii – Philippines, Malaysia, W Indonesia
55. Mallotus kweichowensis – Guizhou
56. Mallotus lackeyi – Borneo, Philippines
57. Mallotus lanceolatus – S China, Indochina
58. Mallotus lancifolius – Andaman & Nicobar Is, Malaysia, W Indonesia
59. Mallotus lappaceus – Myanmar
60. Mallotus lauterbachianus – New Guinea
61. Mallotus leptostachyus – S Myanmar, S Thailand
62. Mallotus leucocalyx – SE Asia
63. Mallotus leucocarpus – Assam, Myanmar
64. Mallotus leucodermis – S Thailand, Malaysia, Borneo, Sumatra
65. Mallotus lianus – Guangdong, Fujian, Zhejiang
66. Mallotus longinervis – Sarawak
67. Mallotus longipes – Myanmar
68. Mallotus macrostachyus – S Thailand, Malaysia, Borneo, Sumatra
69. Mallotus macularis – New Guinea
70. Mallotus megadontus – Queensland
71. Mallotus metcalfianus – N Thailand, Vietnam, Guangxi
72. Mallotus microcarpus – S China
73. Mallotus millietii – Guizhou
74. Mallotus minimifructus – Borneo, Sulawesi, Philippines
75. Mallotus miquelianus – Thailand, Borneo, Malaysia, Philippines, Sumatra
76. Mallotus mirus – Thailand
77. Mallotus mollissimus – Indonesia, Philippines, Papuasia, Queensland
78. Mallotus monanthos – Pahang
79. Mallotus montanus – S Thailand, W Malaysia
80. Mallotus muticus – Malaysia, Borneo, Sumatra
81. Mallotus myanmaricus – Myanmar
82. Mallotus nanus – Laos, Cambodia
83. Mallotus neocavaleriei – Guizhou
84. Mallotus nepalensis – Nepal, Yunnan, Myanmar, Assam, Bhutan
85. Mallotus nesophilus – N Australia
86. Mallotus nudiflorus (Trevia nudiflora, Trevia integerrima) – Indian Subcontinent, SE Asia, S China
87. Mallotus oppositifolius – Madagascar, tropical Africa
88. Mallotus oreophilus – Yunnan, Sikkim
89. Mallotus pachypodus – Myanmar
90. Mallotus pallidus – S Thailand
91. Mallotus paniculatus – Indian Subcontinent, SE Asia, S China, Queensland, Papuasia
92. Mallotus peltatus – Indian Subcontinent, SE Asia, S China, Papuasia
93. Mallotus philippensis – Indian Subcontinent, SE Asia, S China, Papuasia, Ryukyu Islands
94. Mallotus pierrei – Thailand, Vietnam
95. Mallotus pleiogynus – New Guinea
96. Mallotus plicatus – Indochina
97. Mallotus poilanei – Vietnam
98. Mallotus polyadenos – New Guinea, Queensland
99. Mallotus polycarpus – W India
100. Mallotus puber – Solomon Islands
101. Mallotus repandus – Indian Subcontinent, SE Asia, S China, Papuasia, New Caledonia
102. Mallotus resinosus – Indian Subcontinent, SE Asia, Papuasia, Queensland
103. Mallotus rhamnifolius – S India, Sri Lanka
104. Mallotus roxburghianus – E Himalayas
105. Mallotus rufidulus – W Indonesia
106. Mallotus sathavensis – Vietnam
107. Mallotus sphaerocarpus – Sumatra
108. Mallotus spinifructus – Kalimantan
109. Mallotus stewardii – E China
110. Mallotus subcuneatus – S Thailand, W Malaysia
111. Mallotus subjaponicus – Anhui
112. Mallotus subulatus – W + C Africa
113. Mallotus sumatranus – Sumatra, Borneo
114. Mallotus surculosus – Cape York Peninsula
115. Mallotus taoyuanensis – Hunan
116. Mallotus tetracoccus – Indian Subcontinent, Thailand, Myanmar, Yunnan
117. Mallotus thorelii – Indochina
118. Mallotus thunbergianus – Sri Lanka
119. Mallotus tiliifolius – Hainan, SE Asia, Papuasia, Micronesia, Taiwan
120. Mallotus trinervius – New Guinea
121. Mallotus ustulatus – Cambodia
122. Mallotus wrayi – Sumatra, Borneo, W Malaysia
123. Mallotus yunnanensis – Yunnan

=== Formerly included ===
Some species have been moved to other genera, namely: Acalypha Aleurites Blumeodendron Chondrostylis Cleidion Croton Discocleidion Endospermum Hancea Lasiococca Macaranga Melanolepis Neoboutonia Plukenetia Ptychopyxis Rockinghamia Spathiostemon Sumbaviopsis.

1. M. affinis – Macaranga lowii
2. M. angulatus – Melanolepis multiglandulosa
3. M. angustifolius – Rockinghamia angustifolia
4. M. arboreus – Ptychopyxis arborea
5. M. arboreus var. platyphyllus – Ptychopyxis kingii
6. M. auriculatus – Macaranga lowii
7. M. baillonianus – Hancea acuminata
8. M. brevipes Merr. 1915 – Lasiococca brevipes
9. M. brevipes Pax ex Engl. 1895 – Acalypha neptunica
10. M. calcosus – Melanolepis multiglandulosa
11. M. calvus – Spathiostemon javensis
12. M. capensis – Macaranga capensis
13. M. capuronii – Hancea capuronii
14. M. caput-medusae – Ptychopyxis caput-medusae
15. M. cavaleriei – Discocleidion rufescens
16. M. chrysanthus – Ptychopyxis chrysantha
17. M. cordatifolius – Hancea cordatifolia
18. M. dallachyi – Macaranga dallachyana
19. M. diadenus – Endospermum diadenum
20. M. echinatus – Hancea penangensis
21. M. eglandulosus – Spathiostemon javensis
22. M. eucaustus – Hancea eucausta
23. M. geloniifolius – Cleidion javanicum
24. M. glaberrimus – Macaranga glaberrima
25. M. grandistipularis – Hancea grandistipularis
26. M. griffithianus – Hancea griffithiana
27. M. hellwigianus – Melanolepis multiglandulosa
28. M. henryi – Macaranga henryi
29. M. hirsutus – Hancea hirsuta
30. M. hollrungianus – Melanolepis multiglandulosa
31. M. hookerianus – Hancea hookeriana
32. M. hookerianus var. papuanus – Hancea papuana
33. M. impar – Hancea griffithiana
34. M. inamoenus – Macaranga inamoena
35. M. integrifolius – Hancea integrifolia
36. M. kingii – Hancea kingii
37. M. kunstleri – Chondrostylis kunstleri
38. M. kurzii – Blumeodendron kurzii
39. M. leptophyllus – Hancea penangensis
40. M. longistylus – Hancea longistyla
41. M. maingayi – Macaranga pruinosa
42. M. melleri – Neoboutonia melleri
43. M. minahassae – Croton oblongus
44. M. moluccanus – Aleurites moluccanus
45. M. moluccanus var. glabratus – Melanolepis multiglandulosa
46. M. moluccanus var. pendulus – Melanolepis multiglandulosa
47. M. multiglandulosus – Melanolepis multiglandulosa
48. M. nitidus – Cleidion nitidum
49. M. papuanus – Hancea papuana
50. M. papuanus var. glabrescens – Hancea penangensis
51. M. papuanus var. intermedius – Hancea penangensis
52. M. penangensis – Hancea penangensis
53. M. populifolius – Macaranga hemsleyana
54. M. preussii – Plukenetia conophora
55. M. pseudopenangensis – Hancea penangensis
56. M. pseudoverticillatus – Lasiococca comberi
57. M. ramosii – Cleidion ramosii
58. M. samarensis – Cleidion ramosii
59. M. sarawakensis – Hancea penangensis
60. M. speciosus – Sumbaviopsis albicans
61. M. spinulosus – Hancea spinulosa
62. M. stipularis – Hancea stipularis
63. M. subpeltatus – Hancea subpeltata
64. M. tenuipes – Hancea penangensis
65. M. tsiangii – Macaranga lowii
66. M. vernicosus – Blumeodendron tokbrai
67. M. vitifolius – Melanolepis vitifolia
68. M. wenzelianus – Hancea wenzeliana
69. M. woodii – Hancea griffithiana
70. M. xylacanthus – Hancea penangensis
71. M. yifengensis – Croton lachnocarpus
