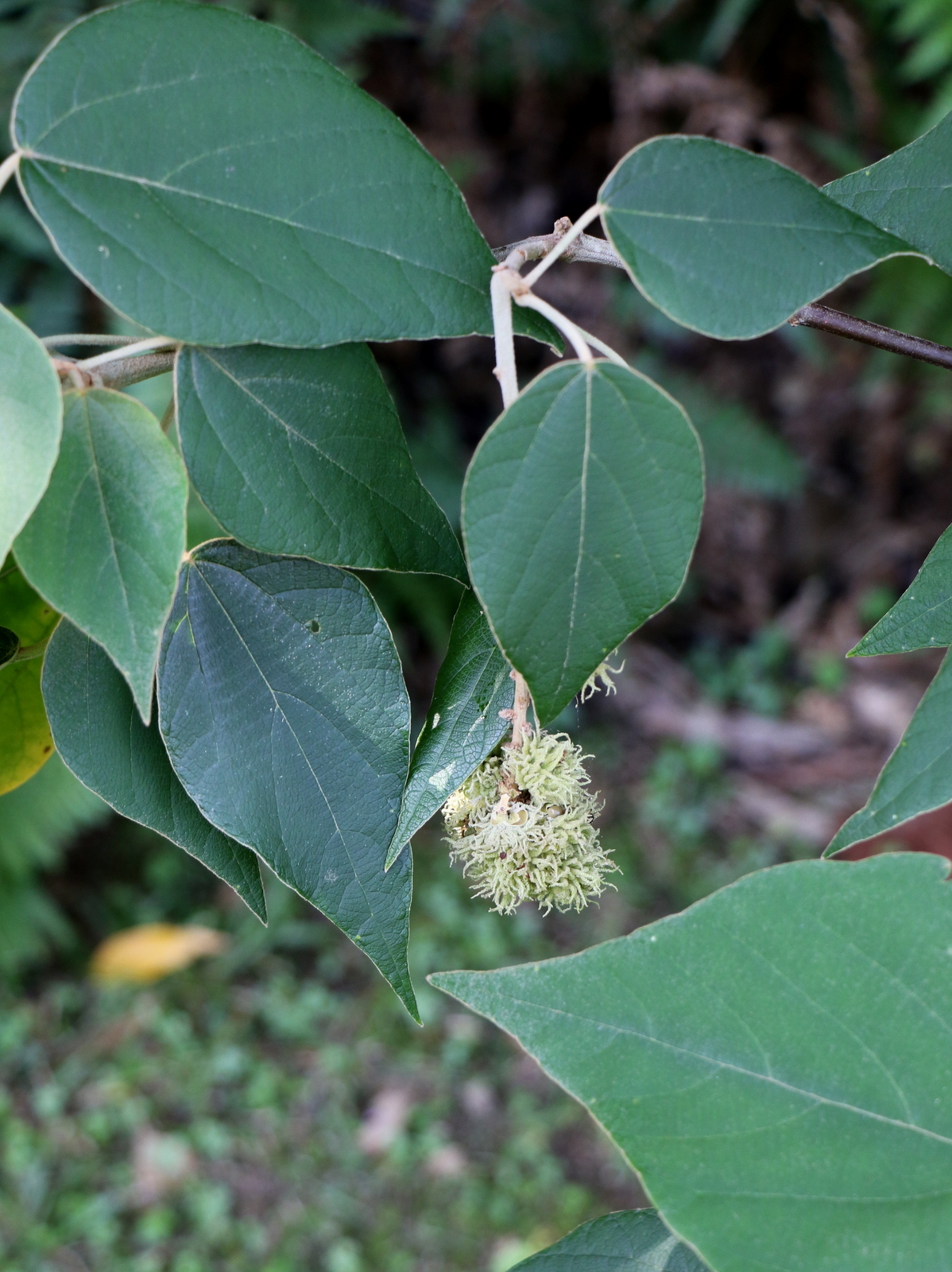

Scientific classification
- Kingdom: Plantae
- Clade: Embryophytes
- Clade: Tracheophytes
- Clade: Spermatophytes
- Clade: Angiosperms
- Clade: Eudicots
- Clade: Rosids
- Order: Malpighiales
- Family: Euphorbiaceae
- Genus: Mallotus
- Species: M. mollissimus

Binomial name
- Mallotus mollissimus (Geiseler) Airy Shaw

= Mallotus mollissimus =

Species of flowering plant

Mallotus mollissimus is a rainforest plant in the spurge family. Indigenous to Queensland, Australia, and Malesia.
