= Mallotus thunbergianus =

Scientific classification
- Kingdom: Plantae
- Clade: Tracheophytes
- Clade: Angiosperms
- Clade: Eudicots
- Clade: Rosids
- Order: Malpighiales
- Family: Euphorbiaceae
- Genus: Mallotus
- Species: M. thunbergianus

Binomial name
- Mallotus thunbergianus (Müll.Arg.) Pax & K.Hoffm.

Synonyms
- Coelodiscus thunbergianus Müll.Arg.

Species of flowering plant

Mallotus thunbergianus is a species of evergreen plant in the family Euphorbiaceae. It is endemic to island of Sri Lanka.
