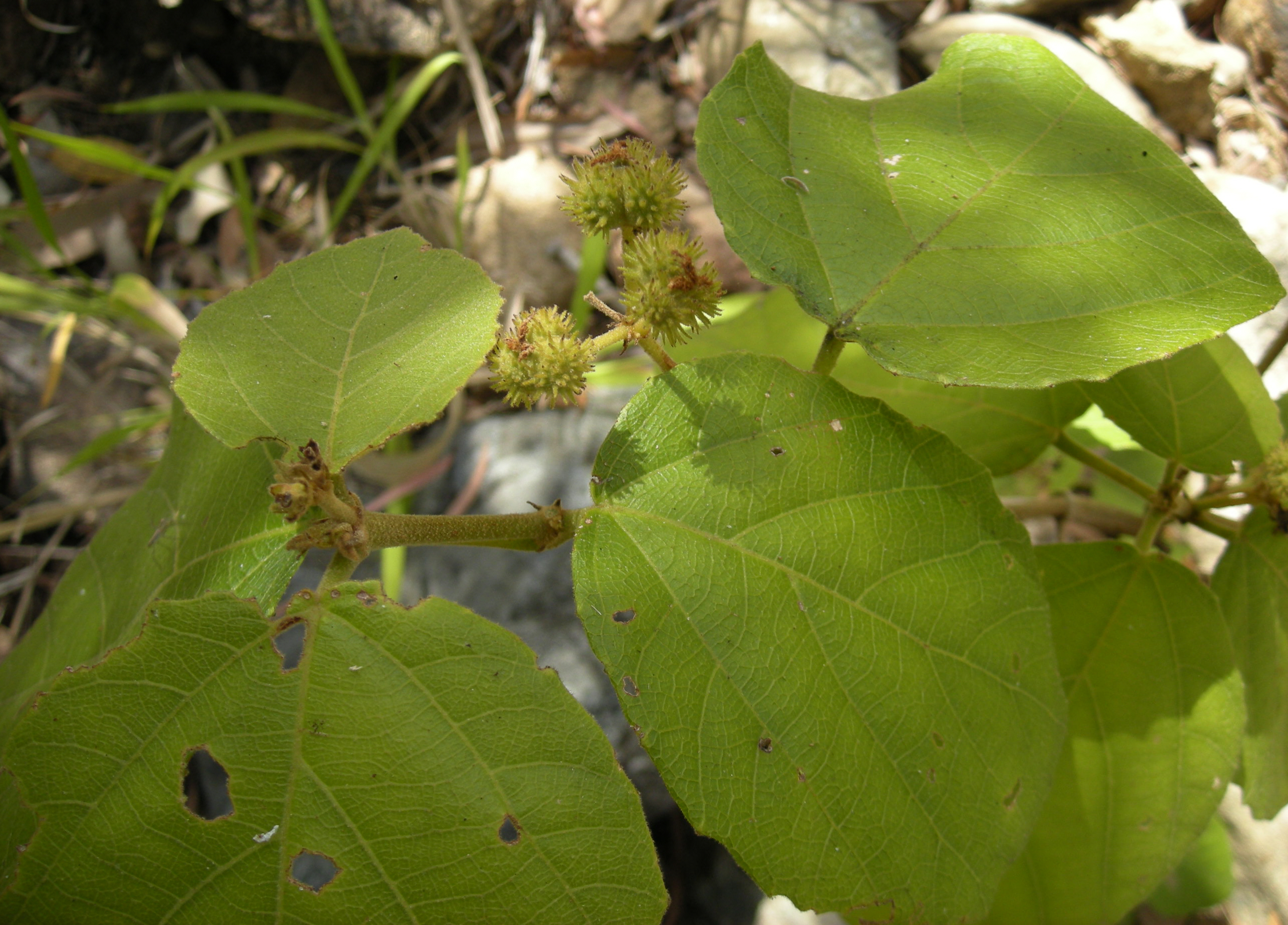
- Mallotus ficifolius fruit and foliage

Scientific classification
- Kingdom: Plantae
- Clade: Tracheophytes
- Clade: Angiosperms
- Clade: Eudicots
- Clade: Rosids
- Order: Malpighiales
- Family: Euphorbiaceae
- Genus: Mallotus
- Species: M. ficifolius

Binomial name
- Mallotus ficifolius (Baill.) Pax & K.Hoffm.

Synonyms
- Echinus claoxyloides var. ficifolia Baill. Mallotus claoxyloides var. ficifolius (Baill.) Benth. Mallotus claoxyloides f. grossidentatus Domin; Mallotus claoxyloides var. macrophyllus Benth.

= Mallotus ficifolius =

Species of shrub

Mallotus ficifolius is a shrub of the spurge family Euphorbiaceae endemic to Northern and Central Queensland, Australia. The species is commonly called fig leafed mallotus.

The species grows as an understorey and pioneer plant in wetter forest types including rainforest and vine scrub and gallery forest. Plants are typically 1–3 m in height and characterised by broad hairy leaves with serrated or toothed margins. Flowers are inconspicuous and yellow. Fruit are of the lobed type typical of the Euphorbiaceae, approximately 10mm in diameter and covered with rough, spiky projections.
