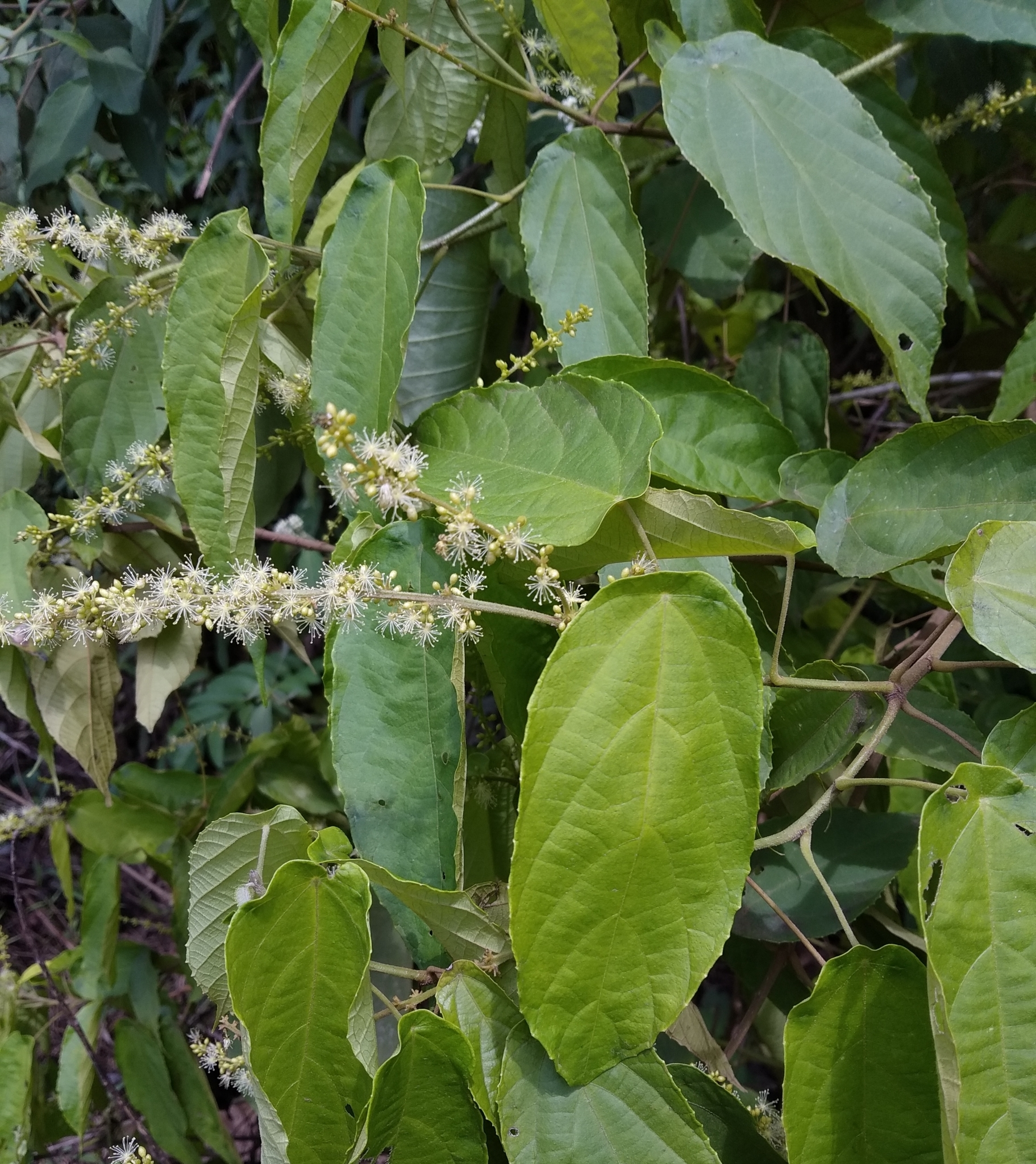

Scientific classification
- Kingdom: Plantae
- Clade: Tracheophytes
- Clade: Angiosperms
- Clade: Eudicots
- Clade: Rosids
- Order: Malpighiales
- Family: Euphorbiaceae
- Genus: Mallotus
- Species: M. peltatus

Binomial name
- Mallotus peltatus (Geiseler) Müll.Arg.

Synonyms
- Aleurites peltatus Geiseler; Adisca acuminata Blume; Hancea muricata Benth.; Mallotus acuminatus (Blume) Müll.Arg.; Mallotus alternifolius Merr.; Mallotus batjanensis Pax & K.Hoffm.; Mallotus camiguinensis Merr.; Mallotus columnaris Warb.; Mallotus floribundus var. cordifolius Chakrab.; Mallotus furetianus Müll.Arg.; Mallotus helferi Müll.Arg.; Mallotus kietanus Rech.; Mallotus lambertianus Müll.Arg.; Mallotus longifolius (Rchb.f. & Zoll.) Müll.Arg.; Mallotus longifolius var. pubescens Müll.Arg.; Mallotus maclurei Merr.; Mallotus oblongifolius (Miq.) Müll.Arg.; Mallotus odoratus Elmer; Mallotus peekelii Pax & K.Hoffm.; Mallotus peltatus var. rubriflorus Chakrab.; Mallotus porterianus Müll.Arg.; Mallotus puberulus Hook.f.; Mallotus stylaris Müll.Arg.; Mallotus tenuispicus Pax & K.Hoffm.; Mallotus warburgianus Pax & K.Hoffm.; Mappa acutifolia Zoll. & Moritzi; Rottlera acuminata (Blume) Baill.; Rottlera acutifolia Hassk.; Rottlera flavigutta Miq.; Rottlera lambertiana (Müll.Arg.) Scheff.; Rottlera longifolia Rchb.f. & Zoll.; Rottlera oblongifolia Miq.; Rottlera stylaris (Müll.Arg.) Scheff.

= Mallotus peltatus =

Species of plant

Mallotus peltatus is a species of flowering plant in the family Euphorbiaceae, native from India to Papuasia. It was first described by Eduard Ferdinand Geiseler in 1807 as Aleurites peltatus.

== Distribution ==
Mallotus peltatus is native to southeast China, Hainan, the Indian region, the Andaman Islands, Cambodia, Myanmar, the Nicobar Islands, Thailand, Vietnam, Malesia (Borneo, Java, the Lesser Sunda Islands, Peninsular Malaysia, the Maluku Islands, the Philippines, Sulawesi and Sumatra), the Bismarck Archipelago and New Guinea.

== Conservation ==
Mallotus odoratus was assessed as "vulnerable" in the 1998 IUCN Red List, where it is said to be native only to a single island in the Philippines. As of February 2023, this species was regarded included within Mallotus peltatus, which has a very much wider distribution.

== As food ==
In Hainan Province, China, its leaves are often harvested and sun-dried to serve as a common herbal tea named "Francolin Tea" (Chinese: 鹧鸪茶) on the dining table.
