= Mallotus =

Mallotus may refer to:

- Mallotus (fish), a fish genus in the family Osmeridae
- Mallotus (plant), a plant genus in the family Euphorbiaceae
