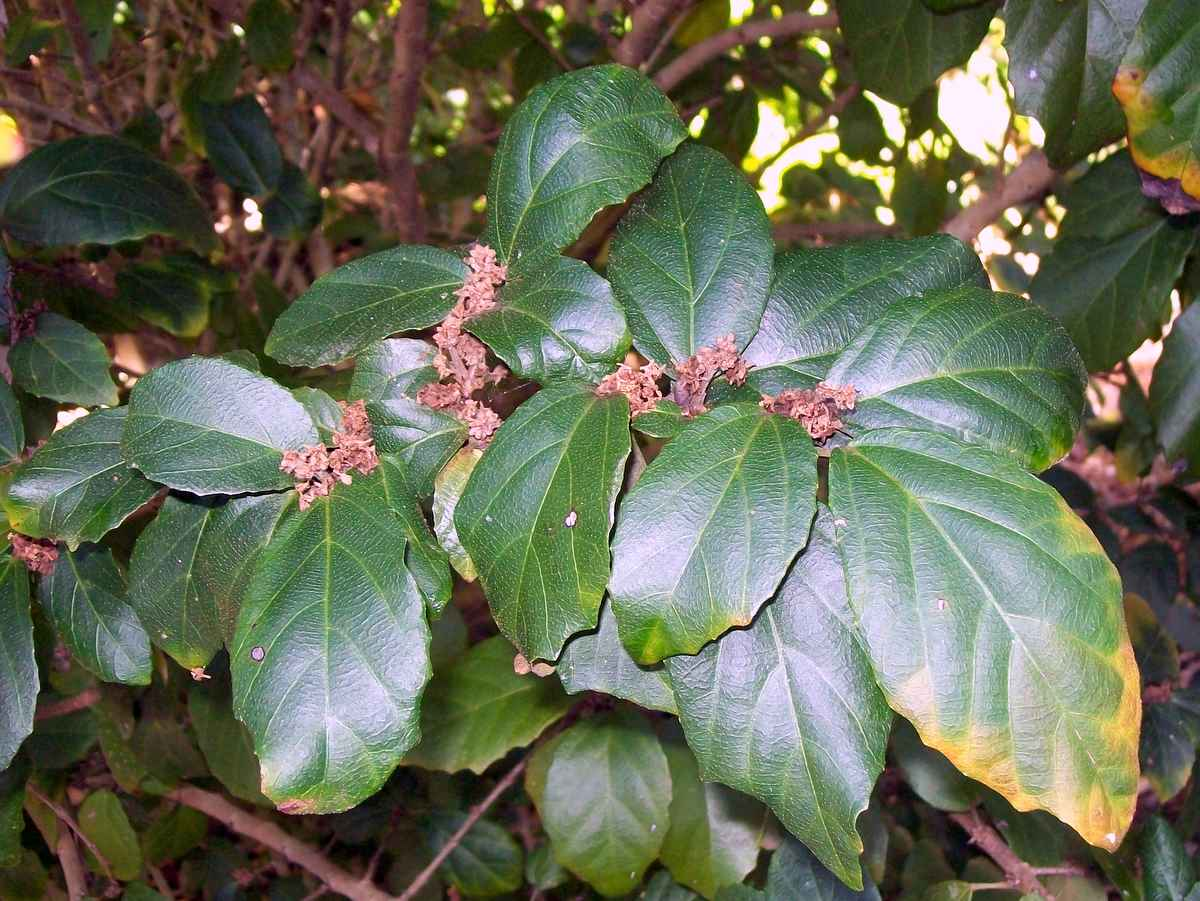
- Mallotus claoxyloides

Scientific classification
- Kingdom: Plantae
- Clade: Tracheophytes
- Clade: Angiosperms
- Clade: Eudicots
- Clade: Rosids
- Order: Malpighiales
- Family: Euphorbiaceae
- Genus: Mallotus
- Species: M. claoxyloides

Binomial name
- Mallotus claoxyloides (F.Muell.) Muell.Arg.

Synonyms
- Mallotus claoxyloides subsp. claoxyloides

= Mallotus claoxyloides =

Green kamala

Species of tree

Mallotus claoxyloides is an Australian rainforest plant in the spurge family. Common names include green kamala, odour bush, and smell of the bush. Opinions are divided on the strong scent of the plant. Some say it is offensive and resembles a skunk while most others find the scent aromatic and delightful. Because of the scent, it is grown in gardens.

The specific epithet refers to the similarity of the foliage to Claoxylon. The natural range of distribution is from the Richmond River, New South Wales to Torres Strait in the north-east of Australia. The habitat is in the drier of eastern Australian rainforests. It is a useful regeneration plant, appearing quickly in disturbed areas.

== Description ==
A bush to small tree, to 11 metres tall with a stem diameter of 23 cm. The trunk is crooked, with fairly smooth grey or greenish grey bark. There are some bumps and irregularities, occasionally forming a vertical row. Small branches are brown, green and downy at the end, usually marked with reddish brown bumps.

Leaves opposite on the stem, 5 to 12 cm long, 3 to 6 cm wide. They are variable in shape, but mostly ovate or elliptic and occasionally heart shaped at the base. Leaves toothed or entire. Glands are sometimes seen on the upper part of the leaf near the leaf base. Leaf stalks show short hairs, and vary in length from 5 mm to 40 mm. Like the related red kamala two basal veins are present, growing to a third of a half of the way up the leaf. Net veins are visible under the leaf.

=== Flowers, fruit and regeneration ===
Greenish yellow flowers form on clusters from October to March. Male and female flowers grow on different trees. No petals on the female flowers. The brown capsule matures from February to June, around 13 mm in diameter, covered with bristles. It splits into two valved segments, with a single grey round seed within each segment. Regeneration from fresh seed is reliable. Cuttings are also expected to do well.
