= Mallotus plicatus =

Scientific classification
- Kingdom: Plantae
- Clade: Tracheophytes
- Clade: Angiosperms
- Clade: Eudicots
- Clade: Rosids
- Order: Malpighiales
- Family: Euphorbiaceae
- Genus: Mallotus
- Species: M. plicatus

Binomial name
- Mallotus plicatus (Müll.Arg.) Airy Shaw

Synonyms
- Coccoceras anisopodum Gagnep.; Coccoceras plicatum Müll.Arg.; Hymenocardia plicata (Müll.Arg.) Kurz; Mallotus anisopodus (Gagnep.) Airy Shaw; Mallotus eriocarpoides Müll.Arg.

Species of plant

Mallotus plicatus is a tree or shrub in the Euphorbiaceae family, in the Polyadenii section. It occurs in much of Mainland Southeast Asia. It is used for dyeing and in construction.

== Description, habitat ==
A tree or shrub, growing from 5 to 15m tall. The twigs can be flattened or round at nodes. The leaves are alternate with the majority pseudo-opposite, terminally grouped, not peltate and in the leaf pairs are unequal but the same shape, the reduced leaves have petioles. Leaves are more than twice as long as they are wide. The base of the leaves can be oblique or not, triple-veined/palmate and flat. The leaves are odourless. Dried leaves are brownish. Glands are clavately shaped. The leaf margin is dentate to serrate, and has glands. The leaf apex is acute. Upper surface of the leaf is glabrous, basally has more than 2 macular glands. Indument simple and stellate, on the petioles the induments are short (<1mm) and dense. The ovate stipules are early caducous, not interpetiolar, with a length less than 4 times the width and a margin with short hairs less than 1mm. The petioles lack an adaxial groove and glands, are 1–5 cm in length, are apically pulvinate, when dried the petioles are basally not constricted. The fruit are smooth, indehiscent, 3-locular, with winged carpels, seeds are caducous, brownish with a smooth coat.

== Habitat ==
The tree occurs commonly in evergreen and mixed deciduous forests and forest edges, and on river banks. It grows at altitude from 40 to 150m. Flowering occurs from May to September, while fruit occurs from May to July. In Cambodia the species is described occurring in secondary formations and particularly abundant along river and in flooded forests of the Tonlé Sap region of Cambodia.

== Distribution ==
The species occurs in the following countries of Mainland Southeast Asia: Thailand, Cambodia, Vietnam, Laos, and Myanmar. There is some doubt of its presence in Peninsular Malaysia.

== Vernacular names ==
In Khmer the plant is variously known as chumpu:, chrolu:ëk préi, chhkaèng or chrâkaéng tûëy.

== Uses ==
The bark of Mallotus plicatus is used to obtain a dye, while the wood is valued as a construction timber. The bark contains compounds that shows some inhibitory activity against Herpes simplex.

== History ==
Herbert Kenneth Airy Shaw (1902–85), an English botanist, described the species in 1962, in the Kew Bulletin.
