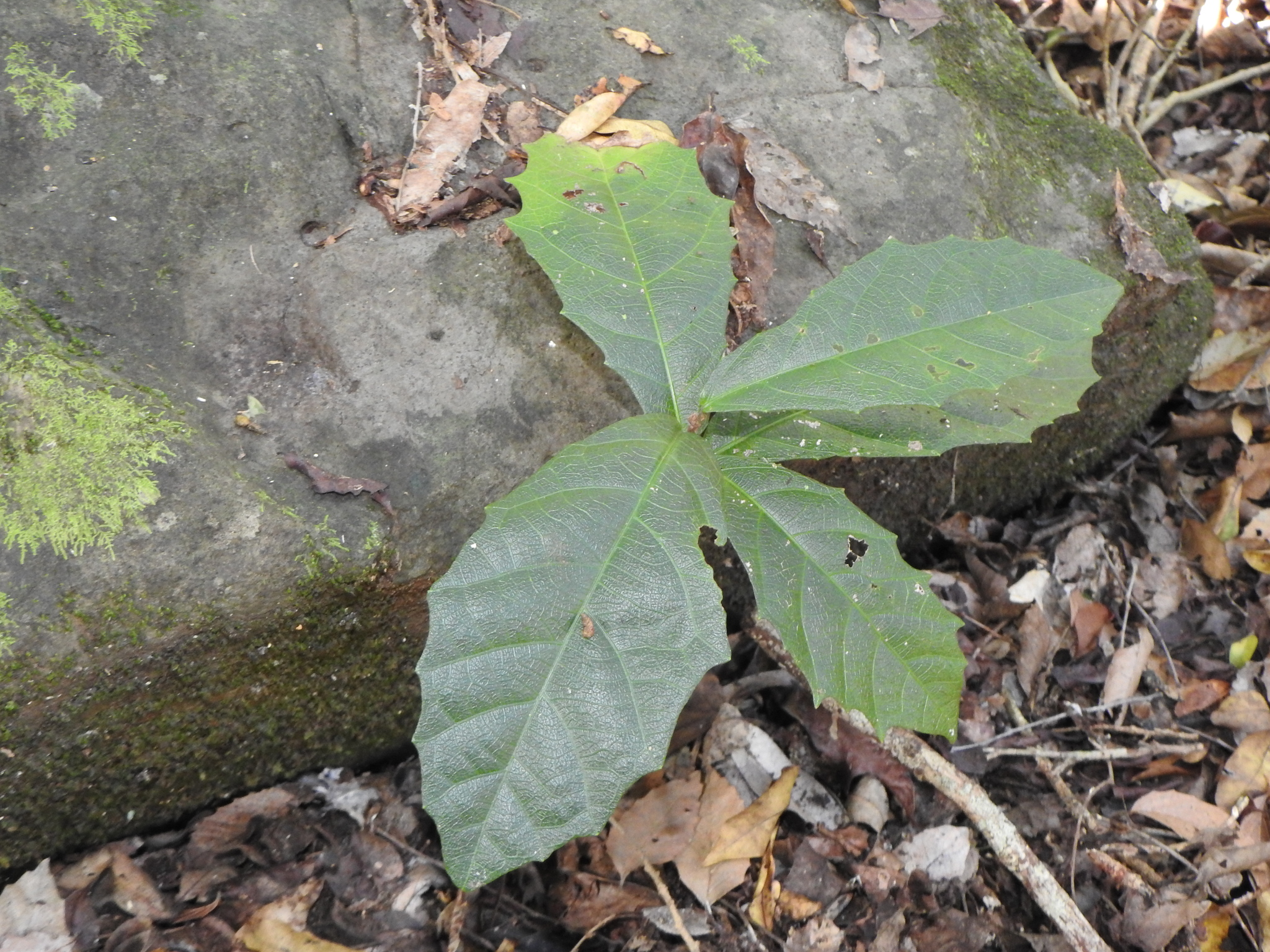

Scientific classification
- Kingdom: Plantae
- Clade: Tracheophytes
- Clade: Angiosperms
- Clade: Eudicots
- Clade: Rosids
- Order: Malpighiales
- Family: Euphorbiaceae
- Genus: Mallotus
- Species: M. megadontus

Binomial name
- Mallotus megadontus (P.I.Forst.)

= Mallotus megadontus =

Toothed mallotus

Species of tree

Mallotus megadontus is an Australian rainforest tree in the spurge family. It is known as the toothed mallotus and is native to South East Queensland. It is listed as vulnerable.
