= Mallotus pleiogynus =

Conservation status
- Least Concern (IUCN 3.1)

Scientific classification
- Kingdom: Plantae
- Clade: Tracheophytes
- Clade: Angiosperms
- Clade: Eudicots
- Clade: Rosids
- Order: Malpighiales
- Family: Euphorbiaceae
- Genus: Mallotus
- Species: M. pleiogynus

Binomial name
- Mallotus pleiogynus Pax & K.Hoffm.

Synonyms
- Octospermum pleiogynum (Pax & K.Hoffm.) Airy Shaw

Species of flowering plant

Mallotus pleiogynus is a species of plant in the family Euphorbiaceae. It is a tree that grows to 43 m (141 ft) tall and is native to New Guinea.

== Distribution and habitat ==
Mallotus pleiogynus is native to the island of New Guinea, occurring in both Western New Guinea and Papua New Guinea. It is mostly found in primary forests, sometimes also secondary forests, at altitudes of up to 660 m (2,170 ft). It prefers flat terrain.

== Description ==
Mallotus pleiogynus is an evergreen tree growing up to 43 m (141 ft) tall, with a trunk diameter of up to 70 cm (28 in). The outer bark is brown to grey in colour and smooth, with white to yellow inner bark. The papery leaves are ovate in shape with a pointed tip and rounded base, measuring 8.8–22.5 cm (3.5–8.9 in) by 7–16 cm (2.8–6.3 in). There are 2-4 large, dark brown nectaries at the base of each leaf on the upper surface. The undersides of the leaves are densely hairy. M. pleiogynus is dioecious and the inflorescences are racemes, produced singly or less commonly in a pair. Male plants produce inflorescences up to 17 cm (6.7 in) long, with dark coloured flowers measuring 1.8–3.5 mm (0.071–0.138 in) in diameter and composed of 3-4 pointed sepals surrounding a cluster of 15-50 stamens. Female plants produce inflorescences up to 7.8 cm (3.1 in) long, each flower measuring 3.5–7 mm (0.14–0.28 in) in diameter and bearing 4-6 sepals and several plumose stigmas. The fruits are ellipsoid indehiscent drupes measuring 9–12 mm (0.35–0.47 in) by 18–22 mm (0.71–0.87 in). The exterior of the fruit is hairy and somewhat wrinkled, yellow to orange when fresh when fresh, turning yellowish to reddish brown and developing 7-9 distinct longitudinal ridges when dry.
