= Mallotus cumingii =

Conservation status
- Least Concern (IUCN 3.1)

Scientific classification
- Kingdom: Plantae
- Clade: Tracheophytes
- Clade: Angiosperms
- Clade: Eudicots
- Clade: Rosids
- Order: Malpighiales
- Family: Euphorbiaceae
- Genus: Mallotus
- Species: M. cumingii

Binomial name
- Mallotus cumingii Müll.Arg.

Synonyms
- Neotrewia cumingii (Müll.Arg.) Pax & K.Hoffm.; Trevia ambigua Merr.

Species of flowering plant

Mallotus cumingii is a species of plant in the family Euphorbiaceae. It is native to Southeast Asia, occurring in Indonesia, Malaysia, and the Philippines. It is a shrub or small tree growing to 25 m (82 ft) tall.

== Distribution and habitat ==
The native range of Mallotus cumingii includes the Philippines, Sulawesi, and the Indonesian and Malaysian territories of the island of Borneo. It inhabits primary and secondary forests at altitudes of up to 1,660 m (5,450 ft). It frequently occurs in damp places alongside rivers and streams.

== Description ==
Mallotus cumingii is an evergreen shrub or small tree growing up to 25 m (82 ft) tall, with a trunk diameter of up to 45 cm (18 in). The outer bark is grey to brown in colour and may be smooth or wrinkled, sometimes peeling away in patches. The leaves are oval in shape, measuring 4.8–35.5 cm (1.9–14.0 in) by 1.5–19.5 cm (0.59–7.68 in), and may be hairy or glabrous. The upper surface of the leaf is dark green and somewhat shiny with a paler underside. M. cumingii is dioecious and the inflorescences are racemes, produced singly or less commonly in a pair. Male plants produce inflorescences up to 21 cm (8.3 in) long, with sweet-scented white, cream, or yellowish flowers measuring up to 3.2–6.9 mm (0.13–0.27 in) in diameter and composed of 2–4 ovate sepals surrounding a cluster of 30–60 stamens. Female plants produce inflorescences up to 19 cm (7.5 in) long, with faintly sweet-scented greenish flowers with a plumose stigma measuring 4.4–8.4 mm (0.17–0.33 in) long. The fruits are rounded indehiscent drupes measuring 9–15 mm (0.35–0.59 in) by 9–15 mm (0.35–0.59 in). The exterior of the fruit is smooth to slightly wrinkled, hairy, and speckled yellowish green to reddish brown when fresh, turning brown or dark grey when dry.
