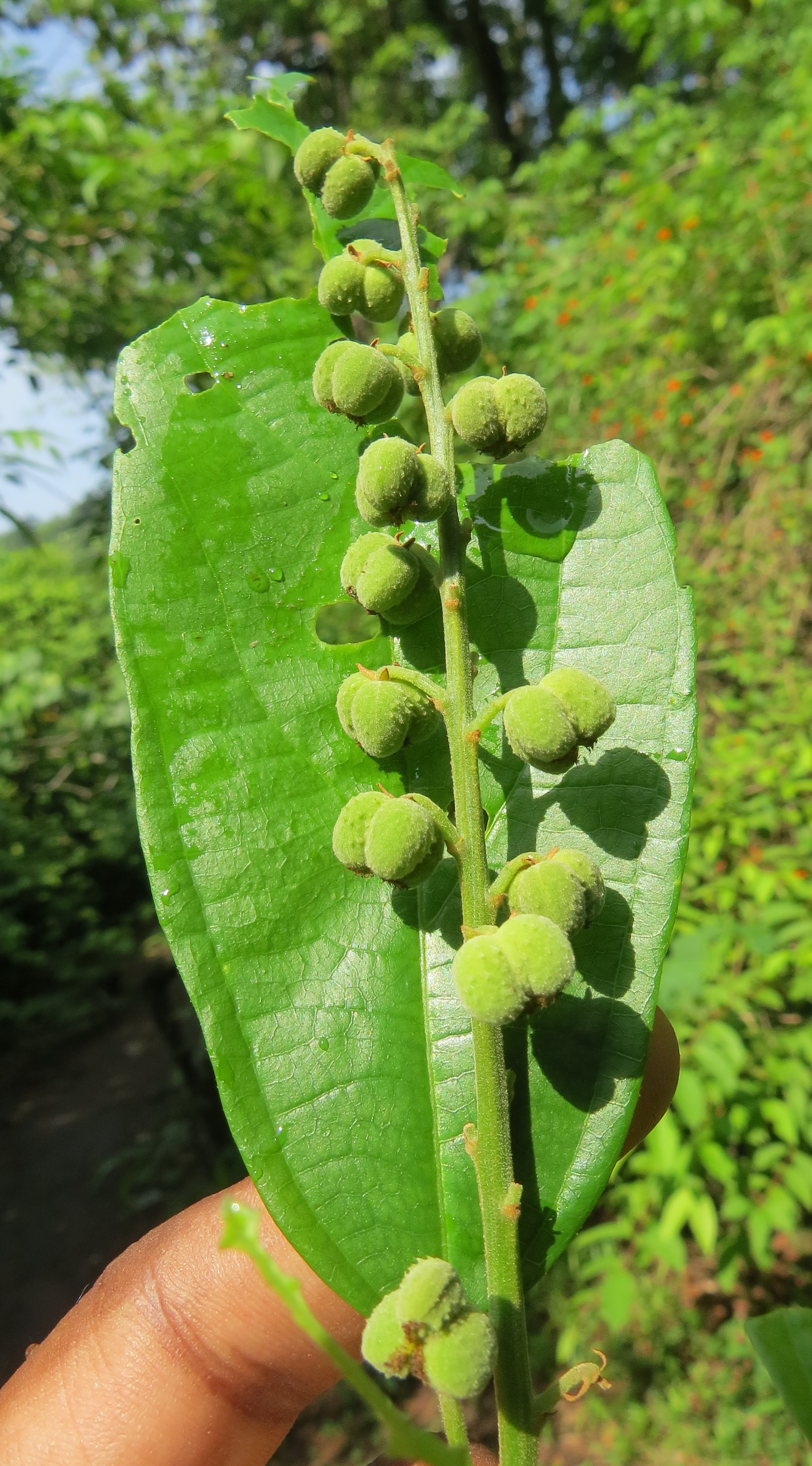

Scientific classification
- Kingdom: Plantae
- Clade: Tracheophytes
- Clade: Angiosperms
- Clade: Eudicots
- Clade: Rosids
- Order: Malpighiales
- Family: Euphorbiaceae
- Genus: Mallotus
- Species: M. rhamnifolius

Binomial name
- Mallotus rhamnifolius (Willd.) Müll.Arg.

Synonyms
- Croton nervosus Rottler; Croton reticulatus Willd.; Croton rhamnifolius Willd.; Mallotus micranthus Müll.Arg.; Mallotus rhamnifolius var. ovatifolius Hook.f.; Mallotus zeylanicus Müll.Arg.; Oxydectes reticulata (Willd.) Kuntze

= Mallotus rhamnifolius =

Buckthorn-leaved kamala

Species of flowering plant

Mallotus rhamnifolius, the buckthorn-leaved kamala, is a species of understory, evergreen plant in the family Euphorbiaceae. It is native to Western Ghats of India and Sri Lanka.

== Leaves ==
Simple, and opposite to subopposite, decussate; apex acute-acuminate: base rounded, entire; secondary nerves are 6-paired.

== Flowers ==
Inflorescence - axillary spikes.

== Fruits ==
3-seeded brownish capsule.

== Common names ==
In parts of India, and Sri Lanka, the plant is known by many local names.

- Malayalam - pee-tsjerou-ponnagam
- Tamil - Marai-Yirdiyam
- Telugu - Konda-Kunkumu
- Sinhala - Bulu hulu keppetiya (බුළු හුලු කැප්පෙටියා)
