= Ferdinand Albert Pax =

German zoologist (1885–1964)

- Born: December 30, 1885; Breslau
- Died: September 11, 1964 (aged 78)
- Education: University of Breslau; University of Zurich; University of Bergen
- Known for: Monograph on Hexacorallia
- Scientific career
- Fields: Zoology, marine Biology
- Institutions: University of Wroclaw; Zoological Station in Trieste; Marine Biology Institute at Rovigno
- Doctoral advisor: Willy Kükenthal

Ferdinand Albert Pax (30 December 1885 – 11 September 1964) was a German zoologist who worked at the University of Wroclaw. He was the author of a monograph on the Hexacorallia in the series edited by Willy Kükenthal.

Pax was born in Breslau to the botanist Ferdinand Albin Pax and Marie Serbin. He went to grammar school at Breslau and then to the university. He later moved to Zurich where he majored in zoology. He worked at the Zoological Station in Trieste in 1906 under Carl Isidor Cori (1865-1954) and then at the University of Bergen where he specialized in marine biology under Adolf Appellöf (1857-1921). He received a doctorate for his work on corals Actiniidae from Breslau with the guidance of Kükenthal. From 1912 he worked as a curator at the Museum of the University of Wroclaw and from 1915 as a professor. He surveyed the zoology of several regions including the Mediterranean region, Poland, France and England. He founded the Hofeberg Biological Station at Glatzer Bergland in 1933 which was destroyed in 1946. He also worked at the Marine Biology Institute at Rovigno. He founded a coral research lab at Bremerhaven in 1947.

During the second world war, the German military force occupied Wrocław and used the Zoological Museum. To make space they threw away 3200 bird skins from the Kollibay Collection which had been purchased in 1920 for 35000 Marks. After the Soviet troops took over, the wet specimens including corals and sponges were destroyed, and the alcohol was drunk. Since methyl alcohol was used, two Red Army soldiers died in January 1945. On December 20, 1945, the Biological Station and the private home of the Pax family in the Glatzer mountains were burned down by unknown persons.

Animal taxa described by Pax include Parnassius apollo L. ssp. sztrecsnoensis Pax, 1915.

Pax married Elisabeth Nohr in 1911 and they had three sons and three daughters including Wolfgang Elpidius Pax (1912–1993) who became a linguist.
