= Mallotus fuscescens =

Conservation status
- Vulnerable (IUCN 2.3)

Scientific classification
- Kingdom: Plantae
- Clade: Tracheophytes
- Clade: Angiosperms
- Clade: Eudicots
- Clade: Rosids
- Order: Malpighiales
- Family: Euphorbiaceae
- Genus: Mallotus
- Species: M. fuscescens

Binomial name
- Mallotus fuscescens Muell.Arg.

Species of flowering plant

Mallotus fuscescens is a species of plant in the family Euphorbiaceae. It is endemic to Sri Lanka.
