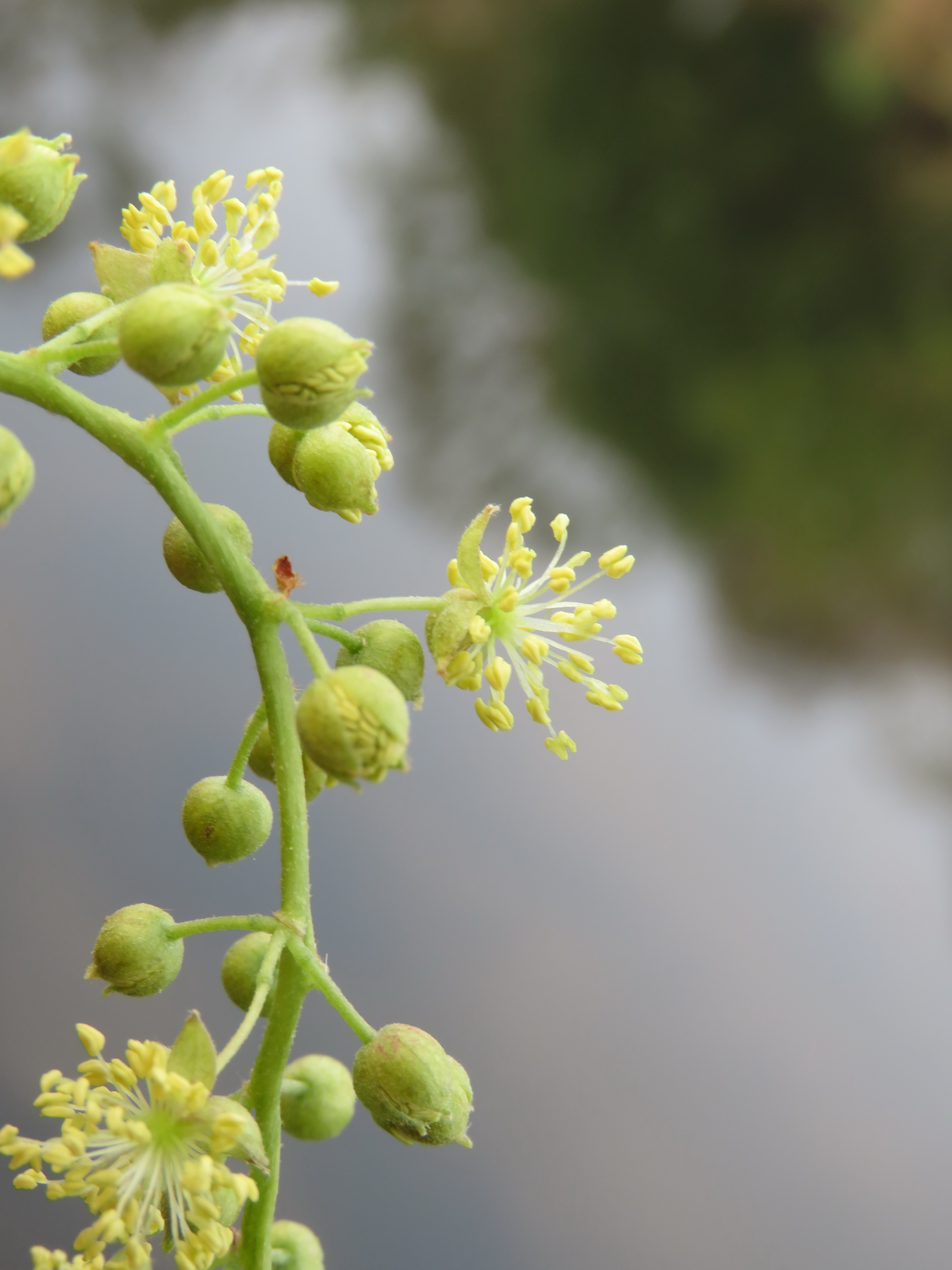
- Flowers
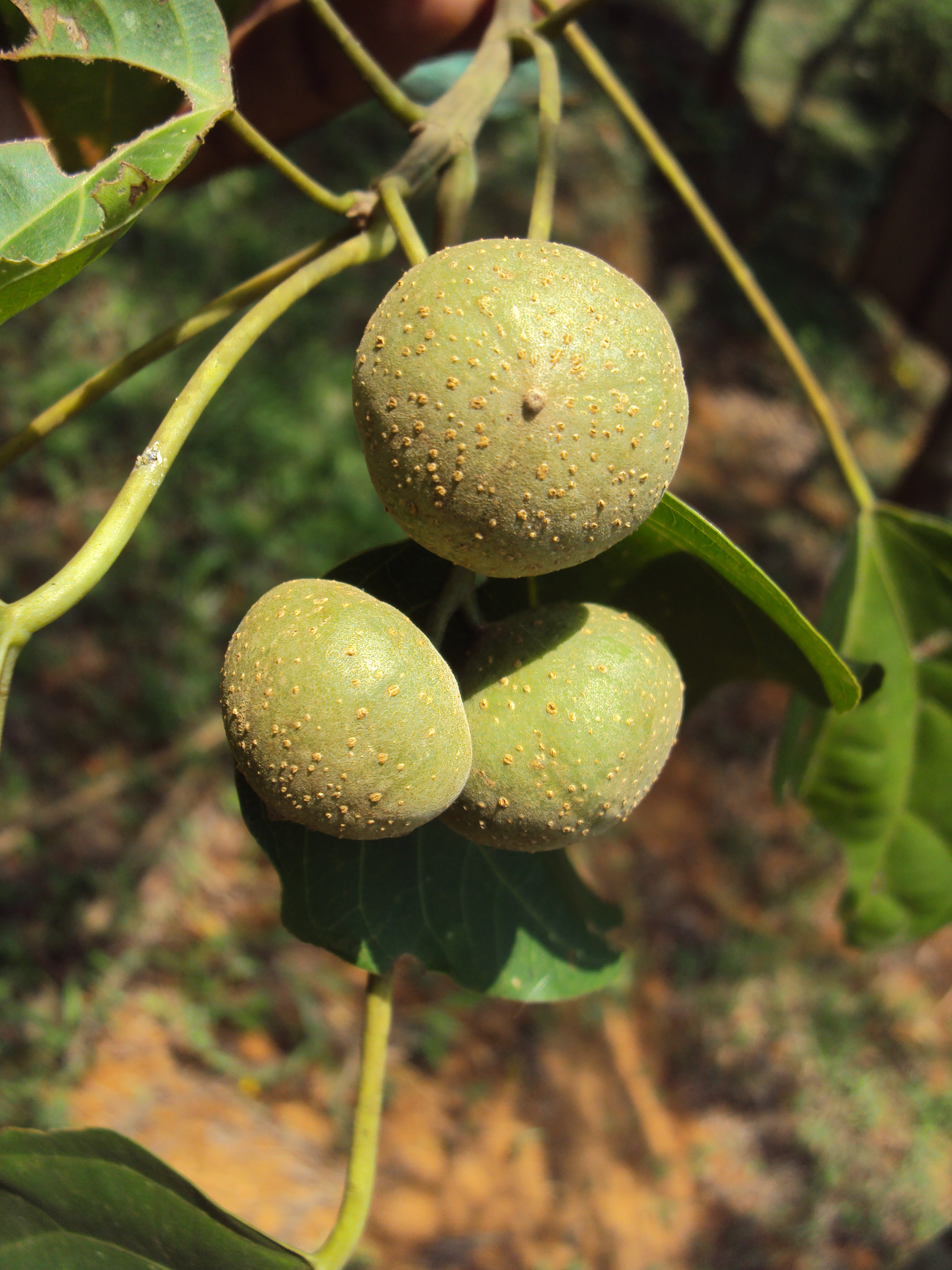
- Fruit

Scientific classification
- Kingdom: Plantae
- Clade: Tracheophytes
- Clade: Angiosperms
- Clade: Eudicots
- Clade: Rosids
- Order: Malpighiales
- Family: Euphorbiaceae
- Genus: Mallotus
- Species: M. nudiflorus

Binomial name
- Mallotus nudiflorus (L.) Kulju & Welzen

Synonyms
- List: Mallotus cardiophyllus Merr.; Rottlera hoperiana Blume ex Müll.Arg.; Rottlera indica Willd.; Rottlera operiana Blume ex Baill.; Trevia integerrima Stokes; Trevia macrophylla B.Heyne ex Roth; Trevia macrostachya Klotzsch; Trevia nudiflora L.; Trevia nudiflora var. tomentosa Susila & N.P.Balakr.

= Mallotus nudiflorus =

Species of plant in the spurge family

Mallotus nudiflorus (syn. Trevia nudiflora), the false white teak, is a species of flowering plant in the family Euphorbiaceae. It is native to the Indian Subcontinent, southern China, Southeast Asia, western Indonesia, and the Philippines. It is a medium-sized tree, typically 10–20 m (33–66 ft) tall.
