= Melanolepis vitifolia =

Scientific classification
- Kingdom: Plantae
- Clade: Tracheophytes
- Clade: Angiosperms
- Clade: Eudicots
- Clade: Rosids
- Order: Malpighiales
- Family: Euphorbiaceae
- Tribe: Chrozophoreae
- Subtribe: Doryxylinae
- Genus: Melanolepis
- Species: M. vitifolia

Binomial name
- Melanolepis vitifolia (Kuntze) Gagnep.

Synonyms
- Mallotus vitifolius Kuntze

Species of plant

Melanolepis vitifolia is a small tropical forest tree, endemic to Vietnam and Cambodia, in the family Euphorbiaceae.

== Description ==
As its name suggests, Melanolepis vitifolia has a grapevine-shaped leaf in contrast with its more widespread relative M. multiglandulosa. This species always has more deeply divided 3-palmatifid leaves, with an absence of teeth along the leaf margins and they are also more hairy than M. multiglandulosa.
