= Mallotus atrovirens =

Conservation status
- Vulnerable (IUCN 2.3)

Scientific classification
- Kingdom: Plantae
- Clade: Tracheophytes
- Clade: Angiosperms
- Clade: Eudicots
- Clade: Rosids
- Order: Malpighiales
- Family: Euphorbiaceae
- Genus: Mallotus
- Species: M. atrovirens

Binomial name
- Mallotus atrovirens J.Hk.

Species of flowering plant

Mallotus atrovirens is a species of plant in the family Euphorbiaceae. It is endemic to Tamil Nadu in India.
