= Mallotus eriocarpus =

Scientific classification
- Kingdom: Plantae
- Clade: Tracheophytes
- Clade: Angiosperms
- Clade: Eudicots
- Clade: Rosids
- Order: Malpighiales
- Family: Euphorbiaceae
- Genus: Mallotus
- Species: M. eriocarpus

Binomial name
- Mallotus eriocarpus (Thwaites) Müll.Arg.

Synonyms
- Coelodiscus eriocarpus (Thwaites) Kurz; Rottlera eriocarpa Thwaites

Species of flowering plant

Mallotus eriocarpus is a species of flowering plant in the family Euphorbiaceae. It is a tree native to Peninsular Malaysia and Sri Lanka.

The species was first described as Rottlera eriocarpa by George Henry Kendrick Thwaites in 1861. In 1865 Johannes Müller Argoviensis placed the species in genus Mallotus as M. eriocarpus.
