= Mallotus korthalsii =

Scientific classification
- Kingdom: Plantae
- Clade: Tracheophytes
- Clade: Angiosperms
- Clade: Eudicots
- Clade: Rosids
- Order: Malpighiales
- Family: Euphorbiaceae
- Genus: Mallotus
- Species: M. korthalsii

Binomial name
- Mallotus korthalsii Müll.Arg.

Synonyms
- Mallotus petanodon Airy Shaw; Mallotus smilaciformis Gage; Rottlera korthalsii (Müll.Arg.) Scheff.

Species of plant

Mallotus korthalsii is a species of flowering plant in the family Euphorbiaceae, native to Borneo, Java, Malaya, the Philippines and Sumatra. It was first described by Johannes Müller Argoviensis in 1866.
