= Mildbraedia carpinifolia =

Conservation status
- Vulnerable (IUCN 2.3)

Scientific classification
- Kingdom: Plantae
- Clade: Tracheophytes
- Clade: Angiosperms
- Clade: Eudicots
- Clade: Rosids
- Order: Malpighiales
- Family: Euphorbiaceae
- Genus: Mildbraedia
- Species: M. carpinifolia

Binomial name
- Mildbraedia carpinifolia (Pax) Hutch.

Species of flowering plant

Mildbraedia carpinifolia is a species of plant in the family Euphorbiaceae. It is found in Kenya, Mozambique, and Tanzania.
