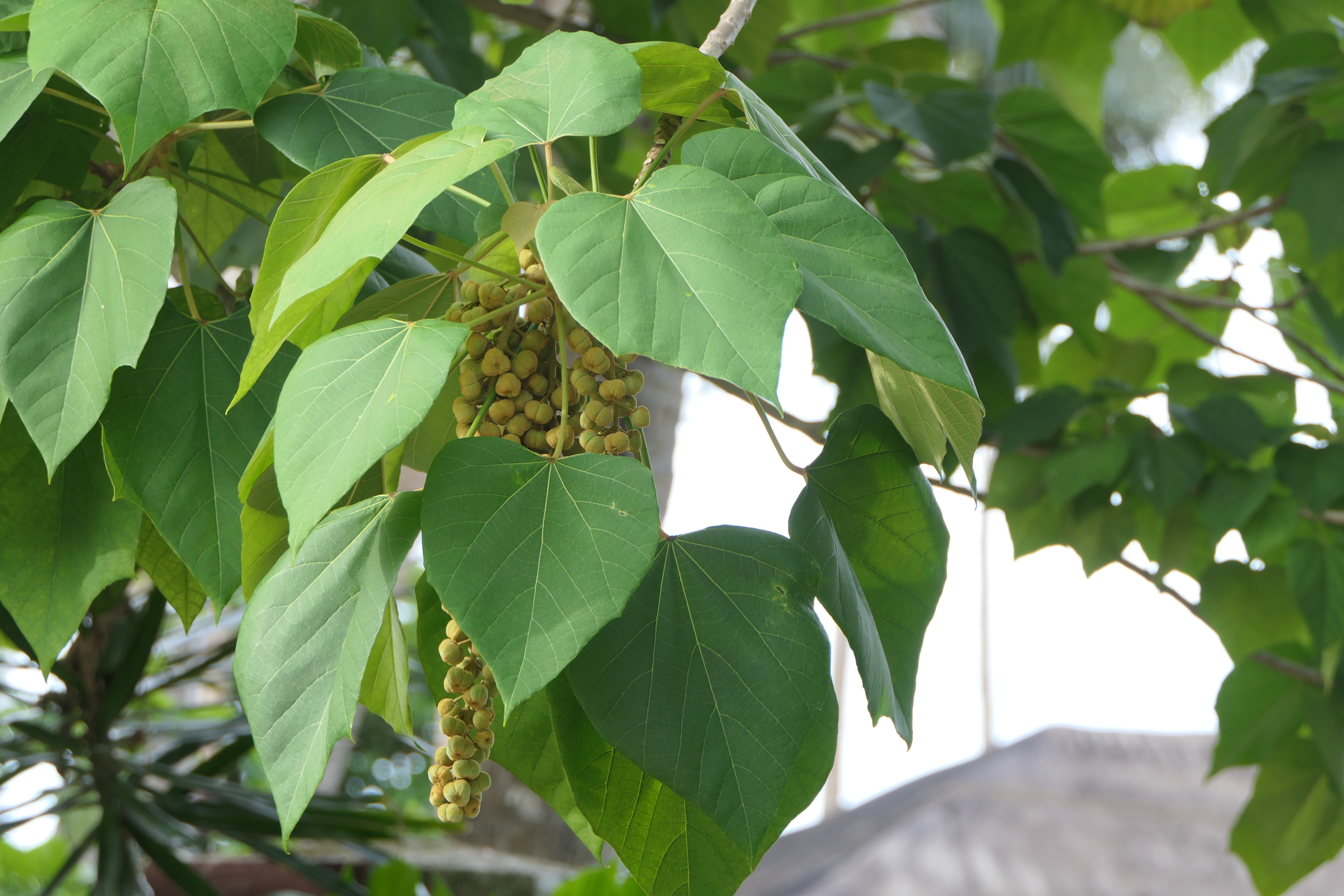
- Melanolepis multiglandulosa

Scientific classification
- Kingdom: Plantae
- Clade: Tracheophytes
- Clade: Angiosperms
- Clade: Eudicots
- Clade: Rosids
- Order: Malpighiales
- Family: Euphorbiaceae
- Subfamily: Acalyphoideae
- Tribe: Chrozophoreae
- Subtribe: Doryxylinae
- Genus: Melanolepis; Rchb.f. & Zoll.

Type species
- Melanolepis multiglandulosa (Reinw. ex Blume) Rchb.f. & Zoll.

= Melanolepis =

Genus of flowering plants

Melanolepis is a plant genus of the family Euphorbiaceae, first described as a genus in 1856. It is native to Southeast Asia, New Guinea, and some islands of the western Pacific.

Species

1. Melanolepis multiglandulosa (Reinw. ex Blume) Rchb. & Zoll - Nansei-shoto, Mariana Islands, Solomon Islands, Bismarck Archipelago, New Guinea, Maluku, Sulawesi, Philippines, Lesser Sunda Islands, Java, Sumatra, Borneo, Thailand, Malaysia, Taiwan
2. Melanolepis vitifolia (Kuntze) Gagnep. - Vietnam, Cambodia
