= Mallotus distans =

Scientific classification
- Kingdom: Plantae
- Clade: Tracheophytes
- Clade: Angiosperms
- Clade: Eudicots
- Clade: Rosids
- Order: Malpighiales
- Family: Euphorbiaceae
- Genus: Mallotus
- Species: M. distans

Binomial name
- Mallotus distans Müll.Arg.

Species of flowering plant

Mallotus distans is a species of plant in the family Euphorbiaceae. It is native to South India and Sri Lanka.

== Leaves ==
opposite and alternate and ovate-lanceolate or oblong, acute or acuminate, base rounded.

== Flowers ==
Inflorescence-axillary spikes.

== Fruits ==
3-lobed capsule.
