= Mildbraedia =

Scientific classification
- Kingdom: Plantae
- Clade: Tracheophytes
- Clade: Angiosperms
- Clade: Eudicots
- Clade: Rosids
- Order: Malpighiales
- Family: Euphorbiaceae
- Subfamily: Crotonoideae
- Tribe: Crotoneae
- Genus: Mildbraedia; Pax

Synonyms
- Neojatropha Pax; Plesiatropha Pierre ex Hutch.

Genus of flowering plants

Mildbraedia is a plant genus of the family Euphorbiaceae first described as a genus in 1909. The entire genus is native to Africa.

Species

1. Mildbraedia carpinifolia – Kenya, Tanzania, Mozambique
2. Mildbraedia klaineana – Republic of the Congo, Democratic Republic of the Congo, Cabinda, Gabon
3. Mildbraedia paniculata – Democratic Republic of the Congo, Gabon, Ghana, Ivory Coast, Liberia

formerly included

moved to Croton

- Mildbraedia balboana - Croton alienus
