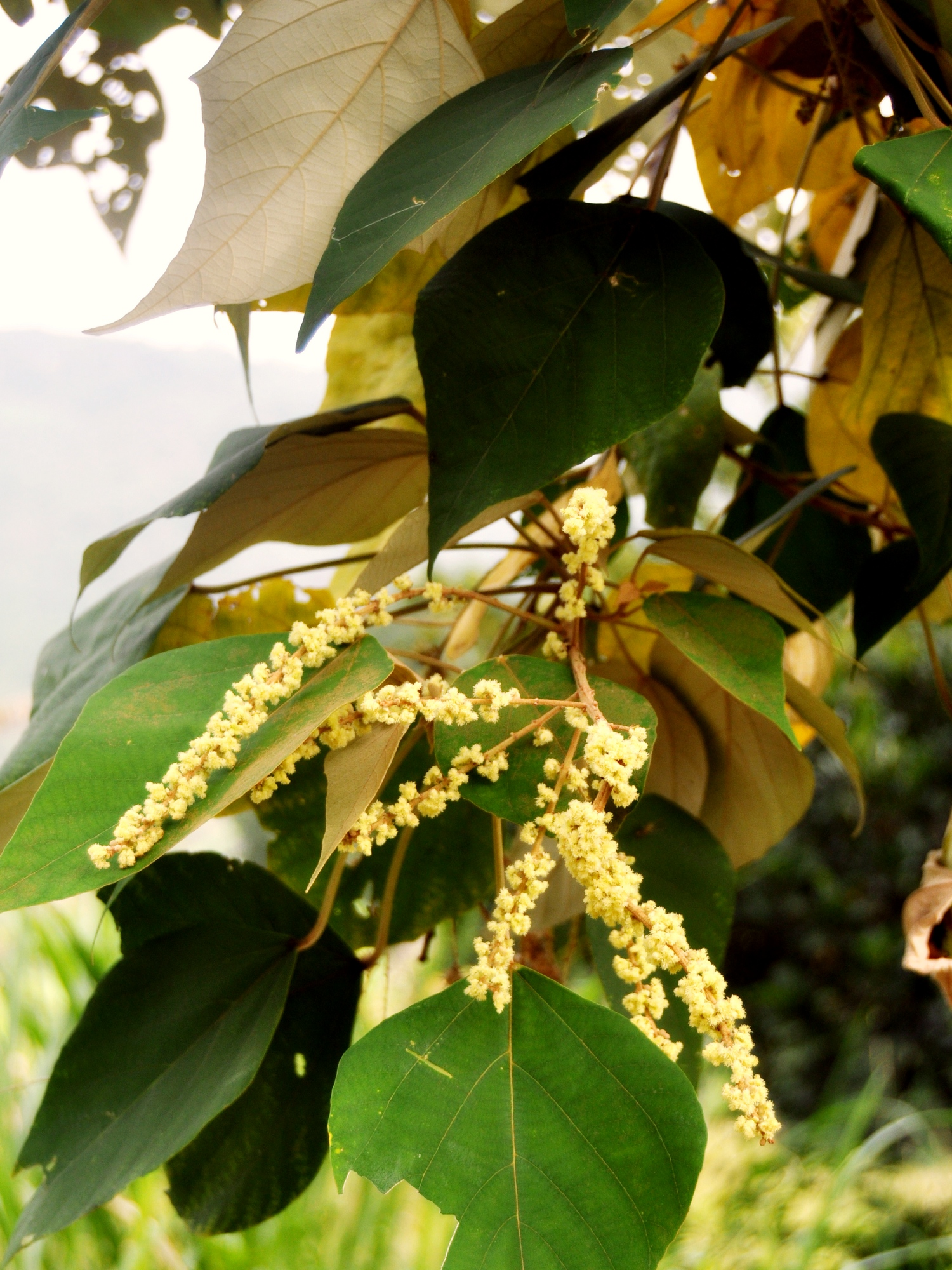

Scientific classification
- Kingdom: Plantae
- Clade: Tracheophytes
- Clade: Angiosperms
- Clade: Eudicots
- Clade: Rosids
- Order: Malpighiales
- Family: Euphorbiaceae
- Tribe: Acalypheae
- Subtribe: Rottlerinae
- Genus: Mallotus
- Species: M. paniculatus

Binomial name
- Mallotus paniculatus (Lam.) Müll. Arg., 1865

Synonyms
- Croton paniculatus Lam.; Rottlera paniculata (Lam.) A.Juss.

= Mallotus paniculatus =

Species of tree

Mallotus paniculatus is a small, subtropical and tropical forest tree species in the family Euphorbiaceae (tribe Acalypheae), found in Asia; the current placement was by Johannes Müller Argoviensis in 1865.

== Varieties and description ==
Plants of the World Online includes two varieties:

- M. paniculatus var. formosanus (Hayata) Hurus. - Taiwan only
- M. paniculatus var. paniculatus - Indian Subcontinent, Southern China, Indochina, Malesia, New Guinea through to Queensland.

== Gallery ==
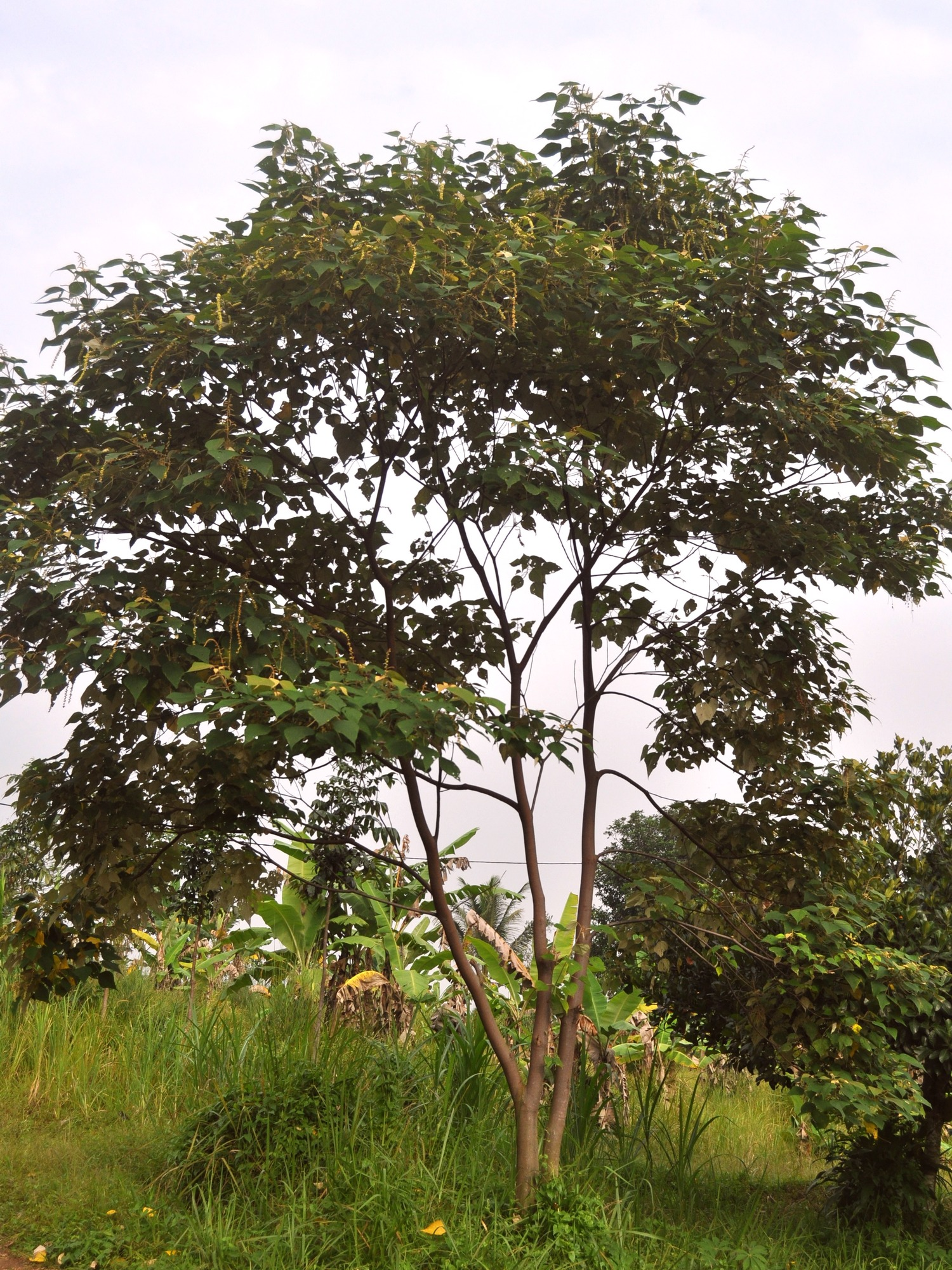

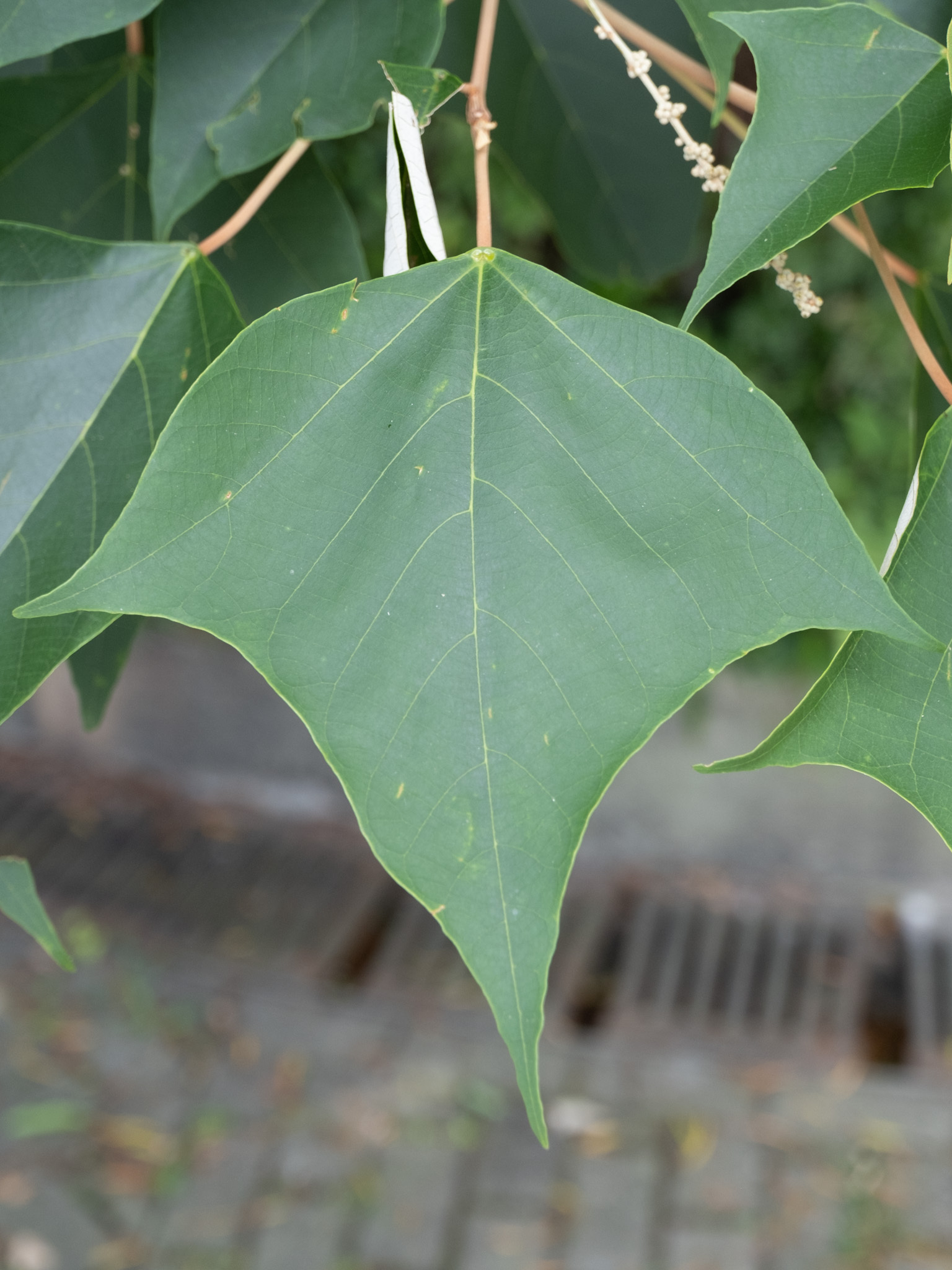

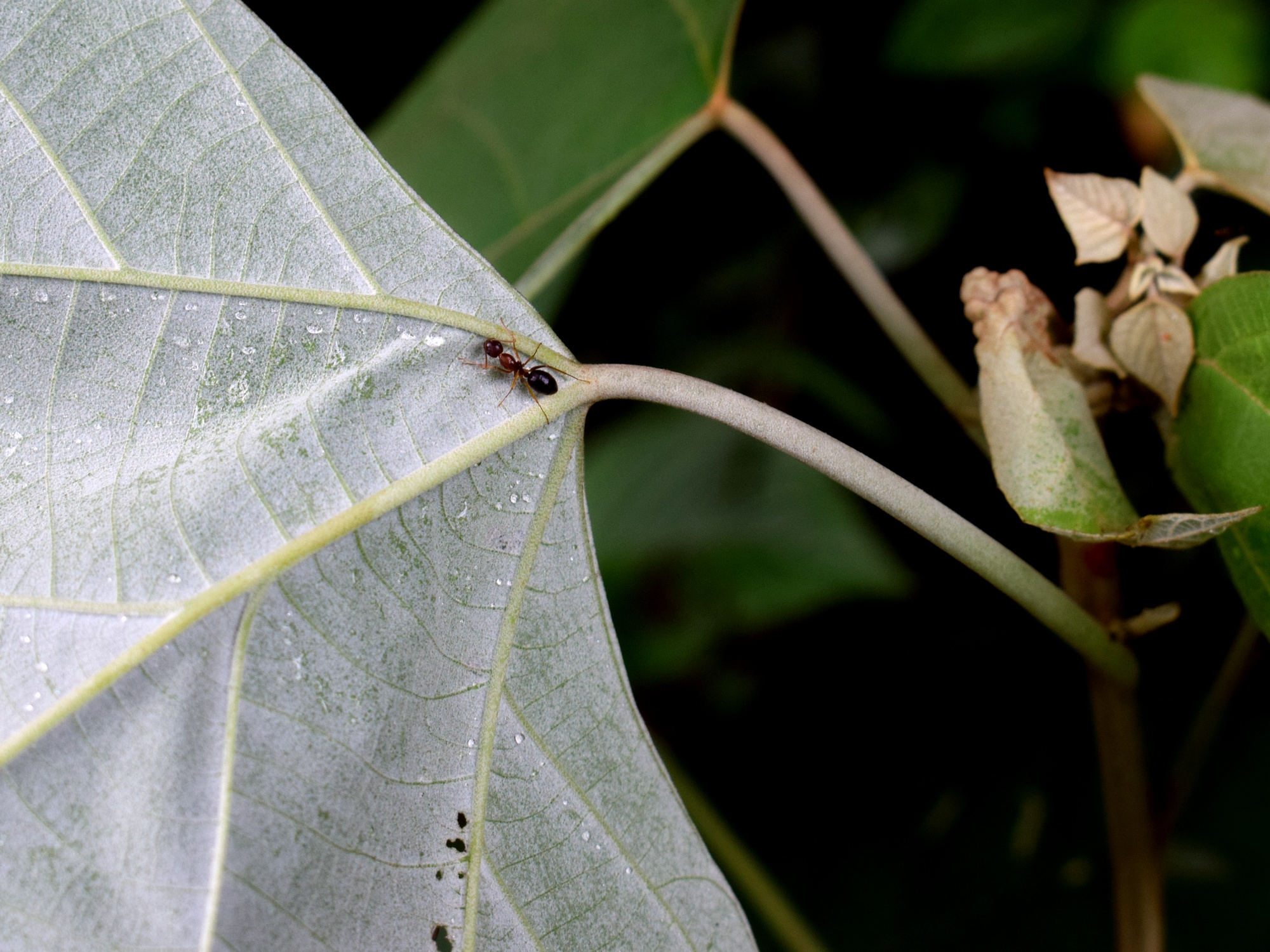

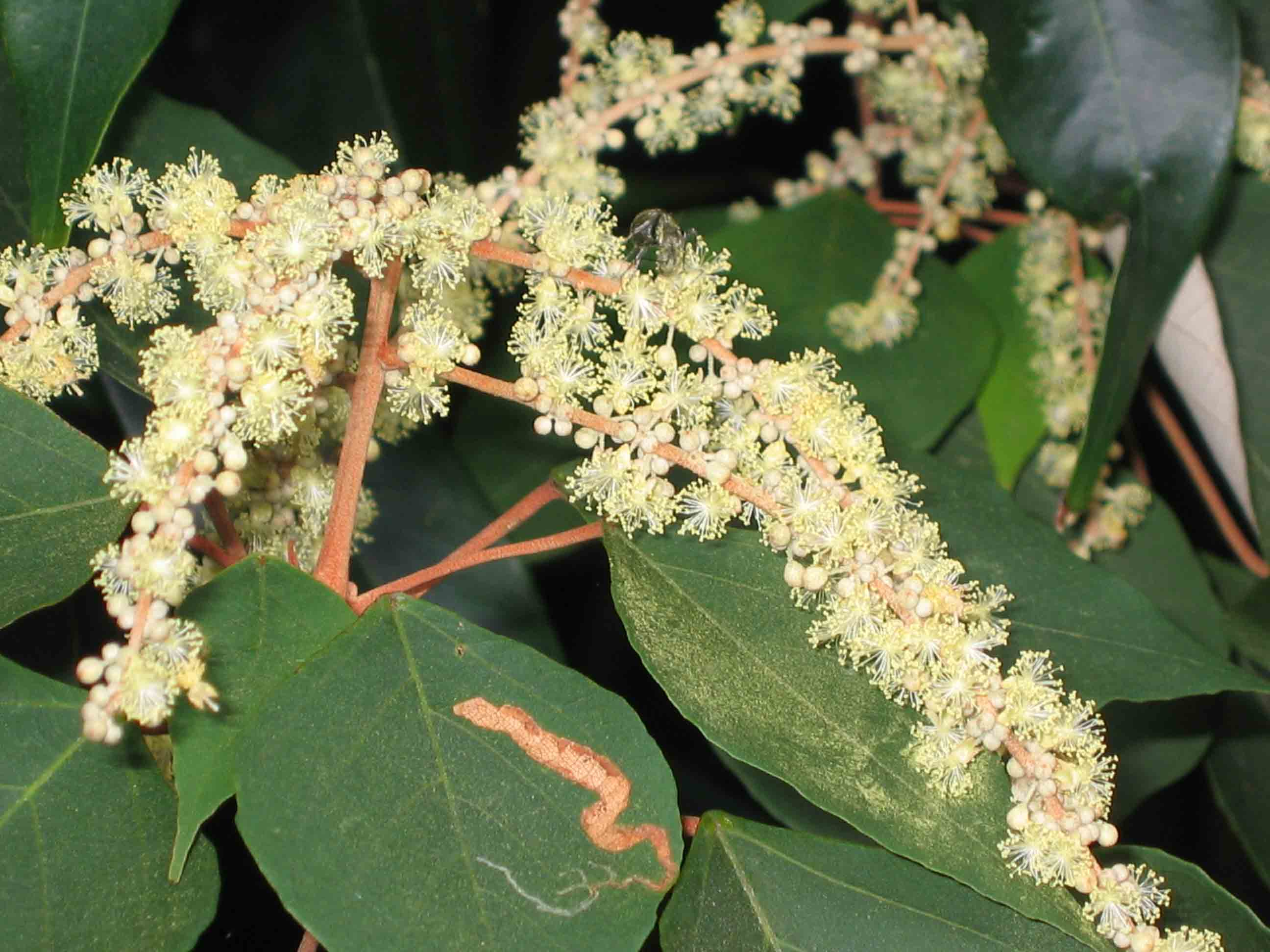
