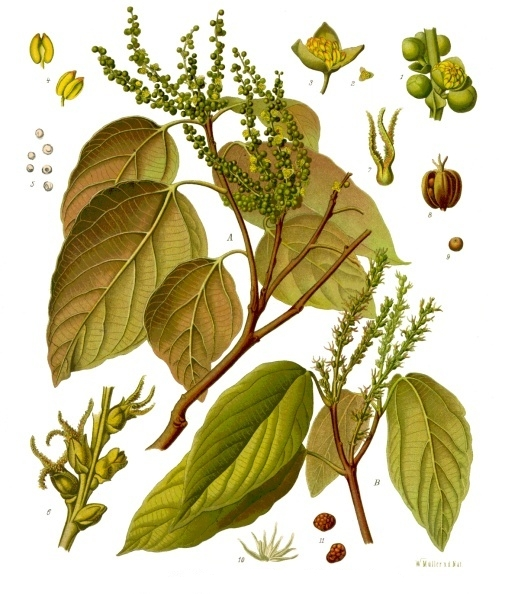

Scientific classification
- Kingdom: Plantae
- Clade: Tracheophytes
- Clade: Angiosperms
- Clade: Eudicots
- Clade: Rosids
- Order: Malpighiales
- Family: Euphorbiaceae
- Genus: Mallotus
- Species: M. philippensis

Binomial name
- Mallotus philippensis (Lam.) Muell.Arg.

Synonyms
- Croton philippense Lam.; Echinus philippensis (Lam.) Baill.; Rottlera tinctoria Roxb.

= Mallotus philippensis =

Species of plant

Mallotus philippensis is a plant in the spurge family. It is known as the kamala tree or red kamala or kumkum tree, due to the fruit covering, which produces a red dye. However, it must be distinguished from kamala meaning "lotus" in many Indian languages, an unrelated plant, flower, and sometimes metonymic spiritual or artistic concept. Mallotus philippensis has many other local names. This kamala often appears in rainforest margins. Or in disturbed areas free from fire, in moderate to high rainfall areas.

It occurs in South Asia, Southeast Asia, as well as Afghanistan and Australia. The southernmost limit of natural distribution is Mount Keira, south of Sydney. The species name refers to the type specimen being collected in the Philippines, where it is known as banato.

== Description ==
A bush to small or medium-sized tree, up to 25 metres tall and a trunk diameter of 40 cm. The trunk is fluted and irregular at the base. The grey bark is smooth, or with occasional wrinkles or corky bumps. Small branches are greyish brown in colour, with rusty covered small hairs towards the end. Leaf scars evident.

Leaves are opposite on the stem, ovate to oblong in shape. 4 to 12 cm long, 2 to 7 cm wide with a long pointed tip. The upper surface is green without hairs, the underside pale grey in colour. With a magnifying glass, small red glands may be visible. Leaf stems 2 to 5 cm long, somewhat thickened at both ends. The first leaf vein on either side of the mid rib extends from the leaf base, to over half the length of the leaf. Veins raised and evident under the leaf.

=== Flowers, fruit and regeneration ===
Yellow-brown flowers form on racemes. Racemes up to 6 cm long. Male and female flowers grow on separate trees. New South Wales flowering period is from June to November. Flowering period in the Philippines is March to April. Fruit may appear at any time of the year, three months or so after flowering. Usually a three lobed capsule, 6 to 9 mm broad, covered in red powdery substance. This is soluble in alcohol, which produces a golden red dye suited to colouring of silk and wool. One small black globular seed in each of the three parts of the capsule, seeds 2 to 3 mm in diameter.

Fresh seed is advised for germination.

It is a moderately growing tree.

== Uses ==
Mallotus philippensis is used to produce yellow dye and herbal remedies. It produces rottlerin, a potent large conductance potassium channel opener.

== Gallery ==
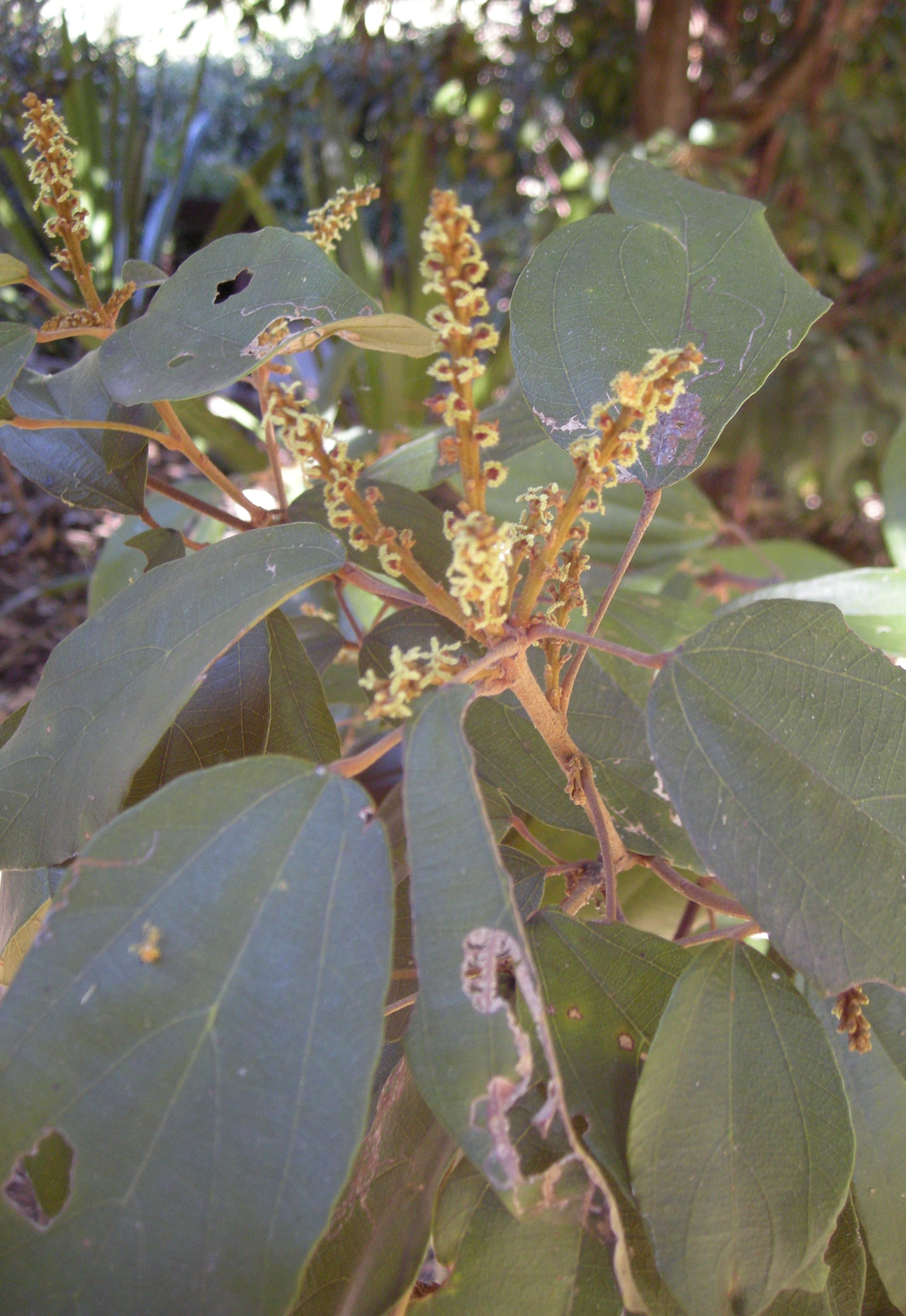
M. philipensis flowers

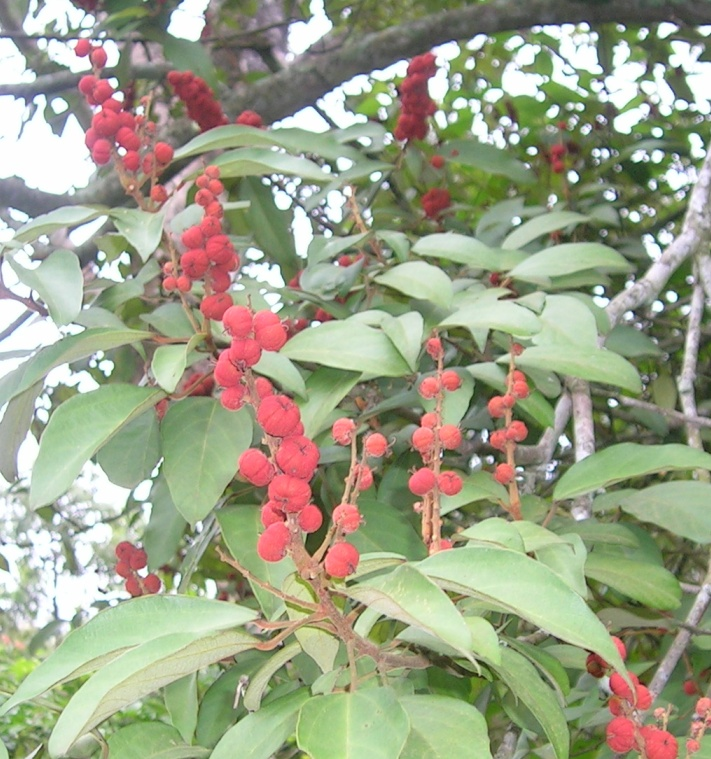
Red coloured fruit of the kamala, Nandi hills slopes, Bangalore, India

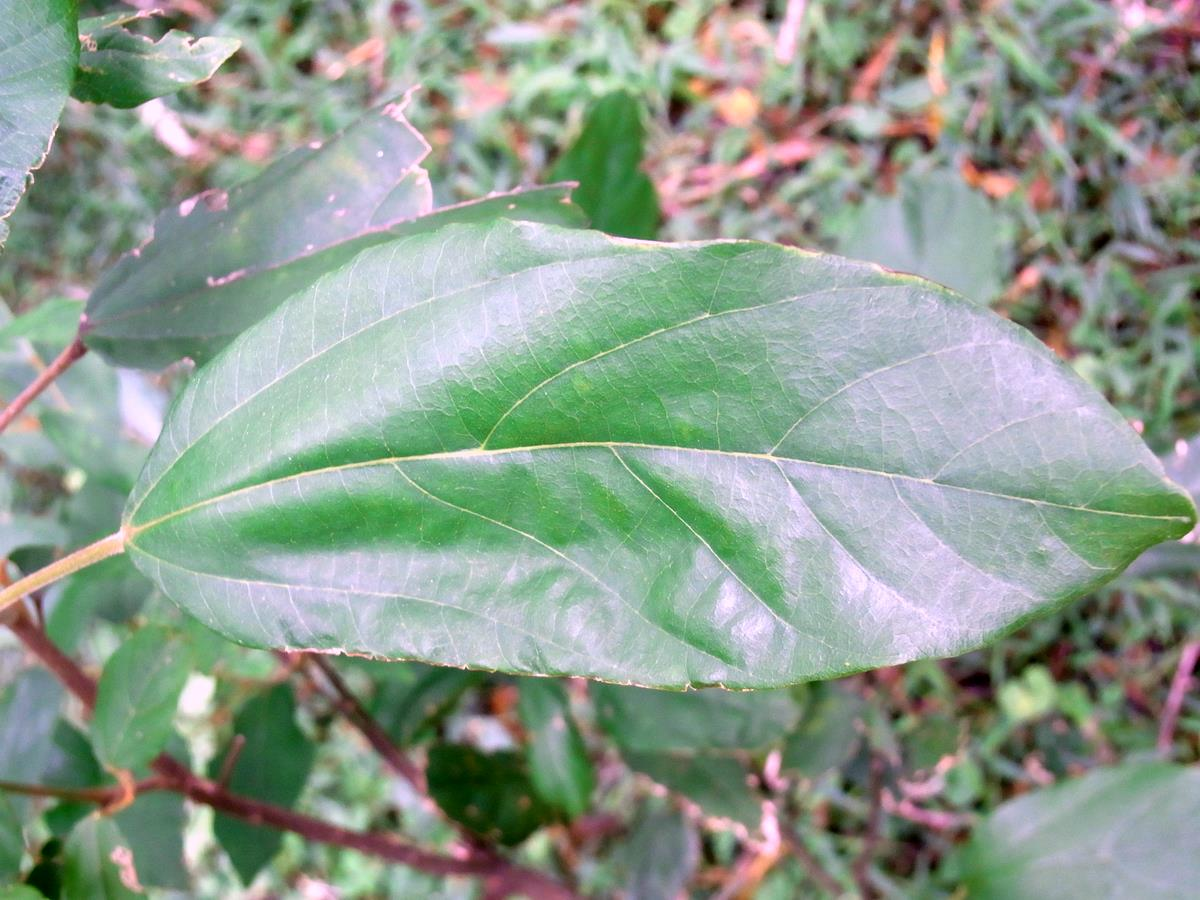
Red kamala at its most southerly point of natural distribution, Mount Keira, Australia

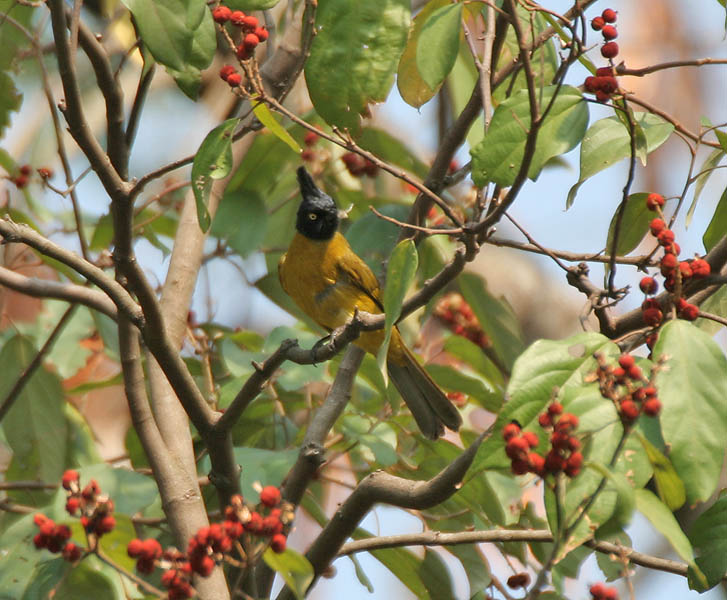
Black-crested bulbul feeding on the red kamala at Jayanti, India
