= Johannes Cornelius Theodorus Uphof =

Johannes Cornelius Theodorus (Theodor) Uphof
- Born: 1886
- Died: 1969 (aged 82–83)
- Known for: Contributions to the taxonomy of the Amaryllidaceae, algae, spermatophytes
- Scientific career
- Fields: Botany
- Author abbrev. (botany): Uphof

Cornelius Johannes Theodoor Uphof (1886–1969 ) was a botanist, phycologist, and teacher. Born in the Netherlands, he worked extensively in the University of Arizona, at Tucson.

He was known for initiating the controversy over the taxonomy of Hippeastrum.

== Publications ==
- 1959. Dictionary of economic plants. Ed. H. R. Engelmann (J. Cramer); Hafner. 400 pp. 2nd. ed. 1968, 591 pp.
