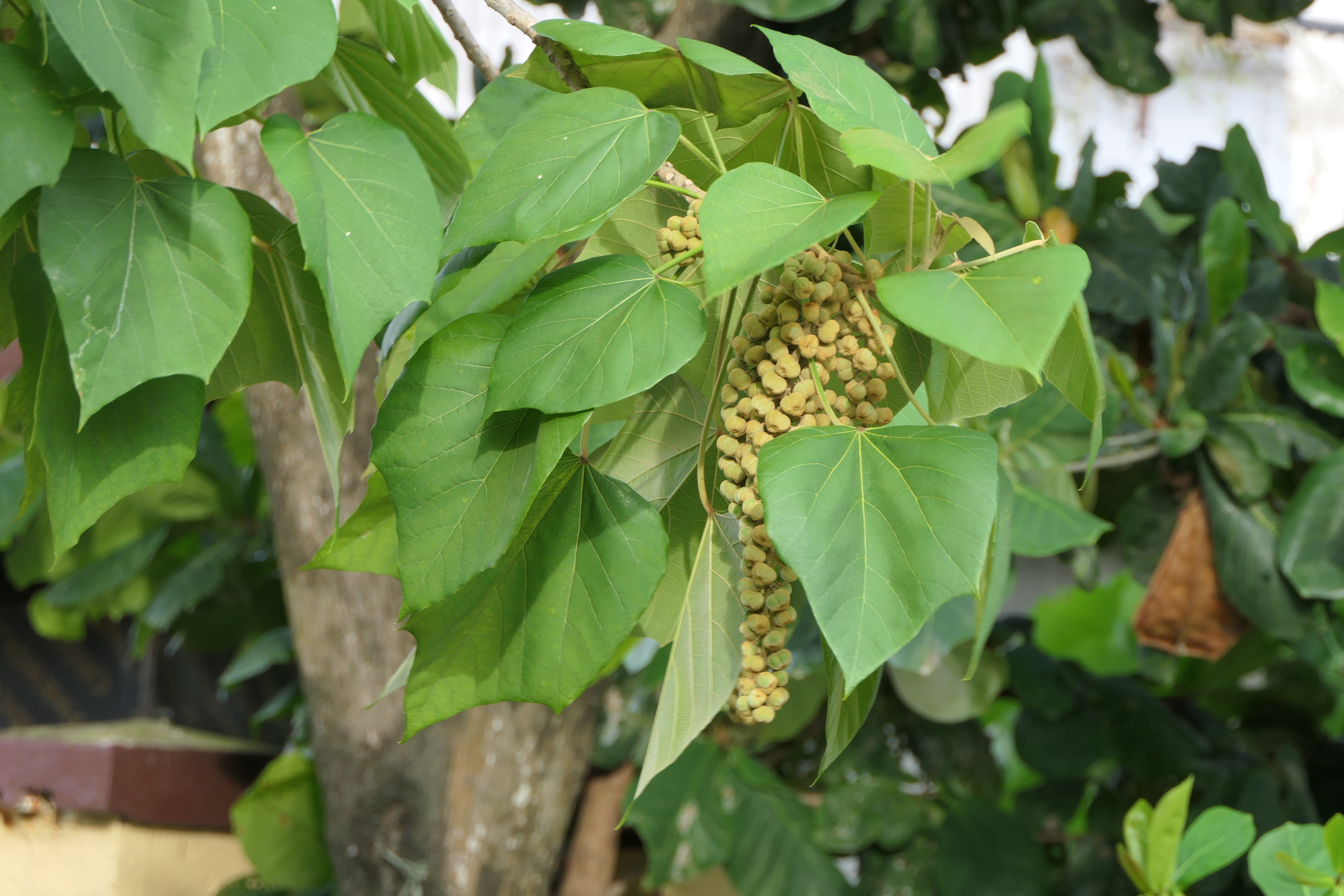

Scientific classification
- Kingdom: Plantae
- Clade: Tracheophytes
- Clade: Angiosperms
- Clade: Eudicots
- Clade: Rosids
- Order: Malpighiales
- Family: Euphorbiaceae
- Genus: Melanolepis
- Species: M. multiglandulosa

Binomial name
- Melanolepis multiglandulosa (Reinw. ex Blume) Rchb.f. & Zoll.

Synonyms
- List: Rottlera multiglandulosa Reinw. ex Blume; Mallotus multiglandulosus (Reinw. ex Blume) Hurus.; Croton multiglandulosus Reinw. ex Blume; Ricinus dioicus Wall. ex Roxb. 1832 illegitimate homonym, not G.Forst. 1786 nor Chev. ex Steud. 1841; Adelia monoica Blanco; Melanolepis angulata Miq.; Melanolepis calcosa Miq.; Mallotus angulatus (Miq.) Müll.Arg.; Mallotus calcosus (Miq.) Müll.Arg.; Rottlera angulata (Miq.) Scheff.; Rottlera calcosa (Miq.) Scheff.; Mallotus hellwigianus K.Schum.; Mallotus hollrungianus K.Schum.; Melanolepis moluccana Pax & K.Hoffm.

= Melanolepis multiglandulosa =

Species of flowering plant

Melanolepis multiglandulosa is a species of plant in the family Euphorbiaceae, first described in 1826. It is native to Japan (Ryukyu Islands), the Mariana Islands, the Solomon Islands, the Bismarck Archipelago, New Guinea, the Philippines, Indonesia, Thailand, Malaysia and Taiwan.

== Gallery ==
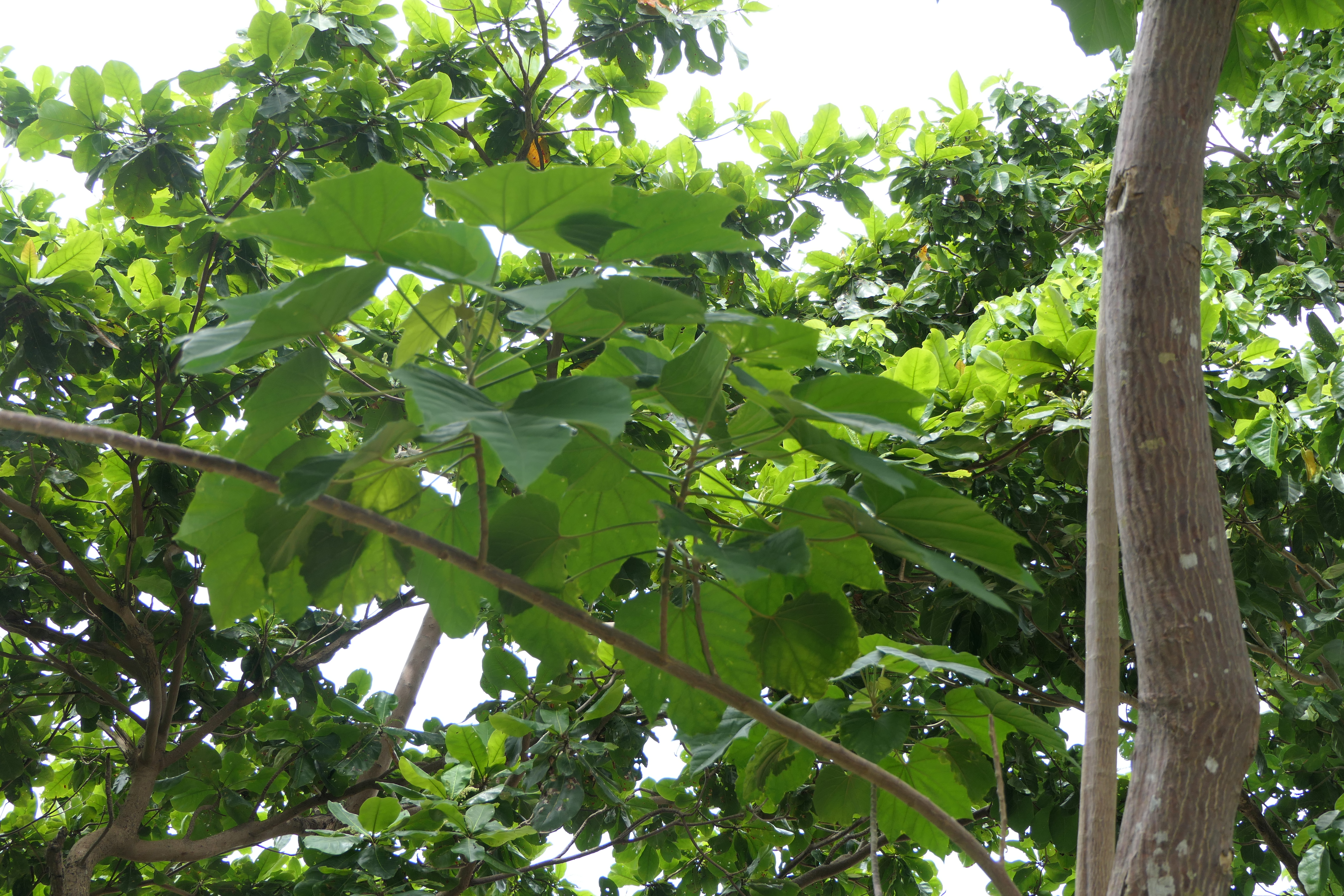
Stem and leaves

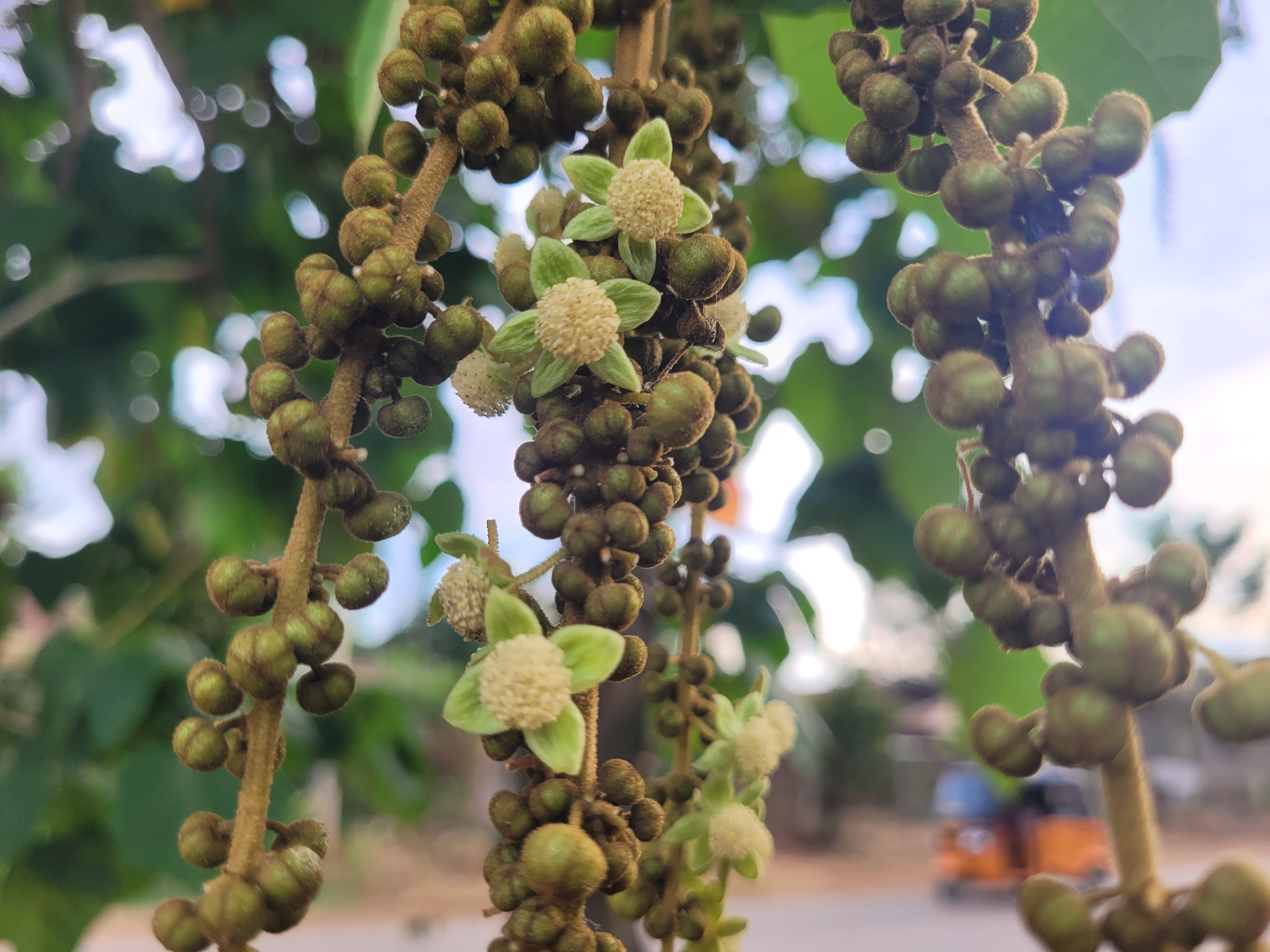
Flowers

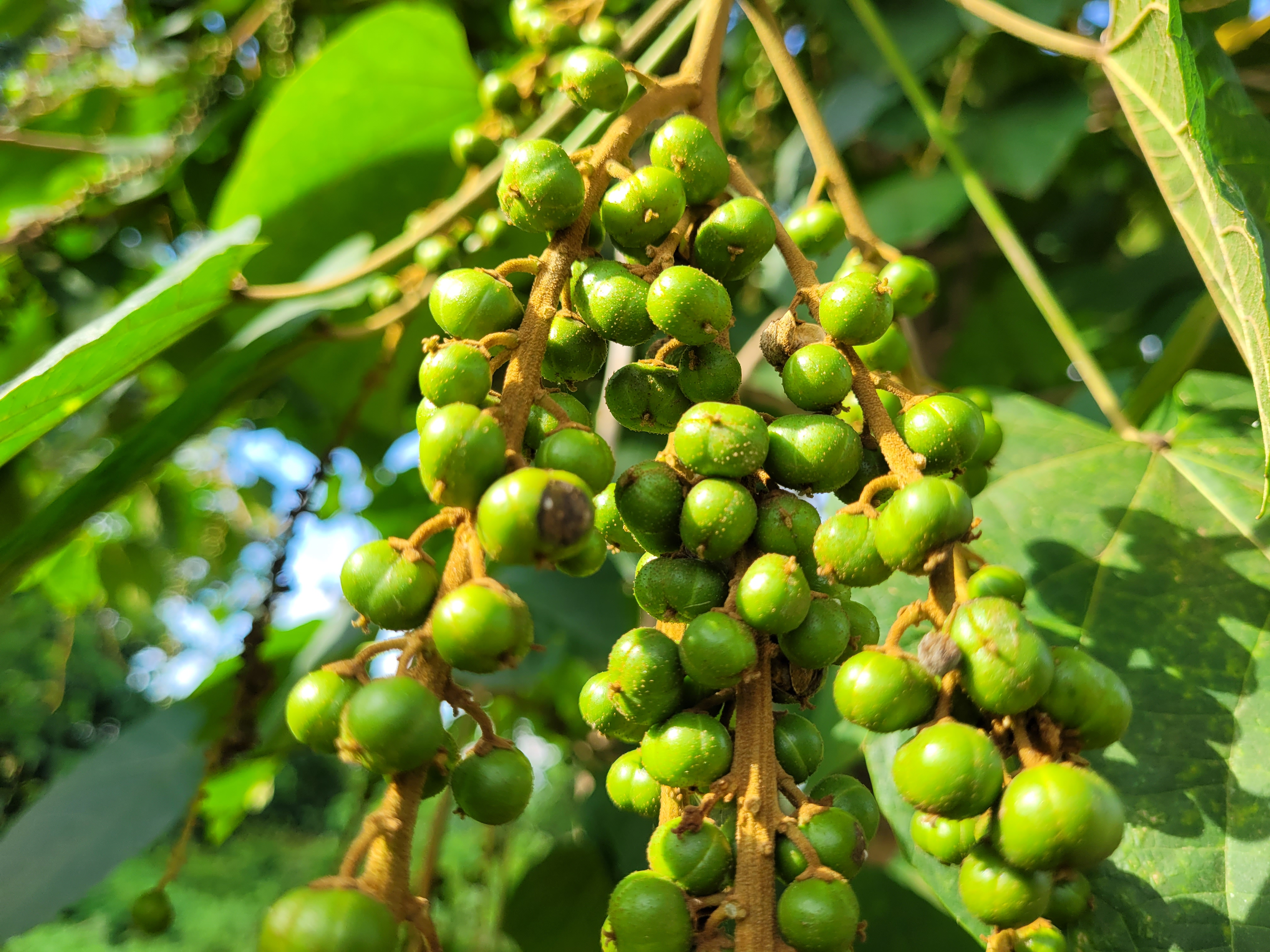
Fruits
