= Eduard Ferdinand Geiseler =

German botanist (1781–1827)

- Born: 21 September 1781
- Died: 1827 (aged 45–46)
- Occupations: botanist, physician
- Known for: investigating the genus Croton
- Notable work: Crotonis monographiam

Eduard Ferdinand Geiseler (21 September 1781 in Stettin – 1827) was a German botanist who worked as a medical doctor in Danzig.

He is known for his investigations involving the genus Croton, of which he circumscribed numerous species. In 1807 he published a monograph on the genus, titled Crotonis monographiam.

In 1841 Johann Friedrich Klotzsch named the genus Geiseleria (family Euphorbiaceae) in his honor.
