= Ferdinand Albin Pax =

German botanist and university teacher (1858–1942)

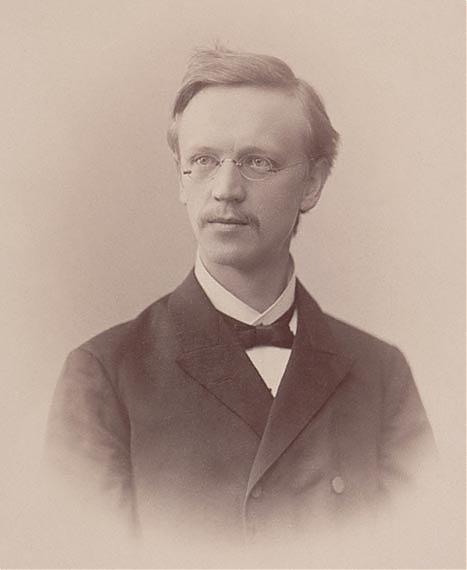
- Born: July 26, 1858; Dvůr Králové nad Labem, Bohemia
- Died: March 1, 1942 (aged 83); Wrocław, Prussia
- Education: University of Wrocław
- Children: Ferdinand Albert Pax
- Scientific career
- Fields: Botany (spermatophytes), cecidology
- Workplaces: University of Wrocław; University of Kiel
- Doctoral advisor: Heinrich Göppert
- Other academic advisors: Adolf Engler

Ferdinand Albin Pax (26 July 1858 – 1 March 1942) was a German botanist specializing in spermatophytes. A collaborator of Adolf Engler, he wrote several monographs and described several species of plants and animals from Silesia and the Carpathians. He was a professor at Wrocław University from 1893. His son Ferdinand Albert Pax (1885–1964) was a noted zoologist.

== Life and work ==
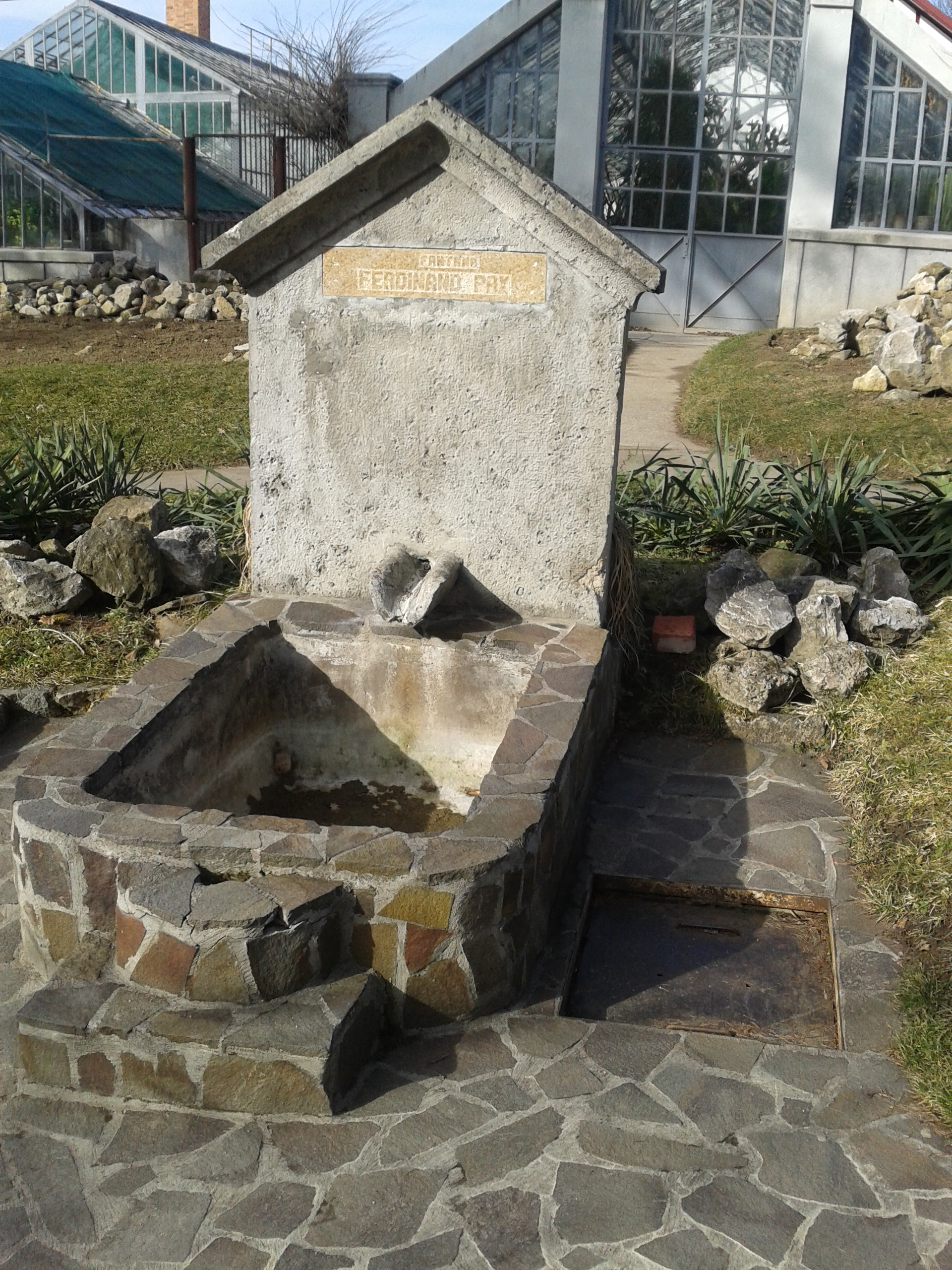
Fountain dedicated to Ferdinand Pax in the Botanical Garden of Cluj-Napoca, Romania

Pax was born on 26 July 1858 in Dvůr Králové nad Labem, in what was then known as Bohemia, to Carl Ferdinand, a mine superintendent in Žacléř, and Elisabeth Haas (died 1861). He graduated from the Kamienna Góra gymnasium and joined the University of Wrocław. He received a PhD in 1882 studying under Heinrich Göppert and moved to Kiel and habilitated in 1886 for studies on the Cyperaceae. He served as an assistant at the Botanical Garden and moved to Berlin in 1889 where he worked with Adolf Engler. In 1893 he became the chair of botany at Wrocław. He became a professor of botany and zoology at the University of Wrocław. Pax was a specialist on the plants in the families Primulaceae, Euphorbiaceae and Aceraceae. Together with Georg Hans Emmo Wolfgang Hieronymus he worked also in the field of cecidology (studying plant galls) and started the exsiccata series Herbarium cecidiologicum in 1892. He continued this work together with Rudolph Dittrich and later R. Dittrich and Alexander von Lingelsheim.

He was married to Marie Serbin and they had a son Ferdinand Albert Pax, who became a zoologist and specialist on corals. Pax died on 1 March 1942 in Wrocław, which at the time was part of Prussia and was buried at Ślężna.

== Selected publications ==
The following are just two among numerous papers and monographs. He was one of the most prolific collaborators of Adolf Engler. A more complete list can be found in Stafleu & Cowan (1983). He described a number of plant species.

- Pax, Ferdinand Albin (1890). Beiträge zur Kenntnis der Amaryllidaceae (in Latin and German). Vol. 11. pp. 318–337., in Engler (1890)
- Pax, Ferdinand (1887). Amaryllidaceae. Vol. Teil 2, Abt. 1-6. pp. 97–124., in Engler & Prantl (1888)

Plant genera that have been named after Pax include Neopaxia, Paxia, Paxiodendron, Paxina and Paxiuscula.

Taxa named by him (along with others like Engler) include Acalypha, Acidoton, Adenochlaena, Annesijoa novoguineensis, Argomuellera, Blachia, Cephalocrotonopsis, Chonocentrum, Cladogynos orientalis, Cleistanthus, Conceveiba, Crotonogynopsis, Deuteromallotus, Discoclaoxylon, Emblingiaceae, Erythrococca, Haematostemon, Hippeastrum, Jatropha, Lingelsheimia, Mareyopsis, Mildbraedia, Monadenium, Necepsia, Neoscortechinia, Neotrewia cumingii, Octospermum pleiogynum, Pachystylidium hirsutum, Petalodiscus, Plukenetia, Pseudagrostistachys, Pseudolachnostylis maprouneifolia, Ptychopyxis, Romanoa, Sphaerostylis, Tetraplandra, Thecacoris, and Zimmermannia.
