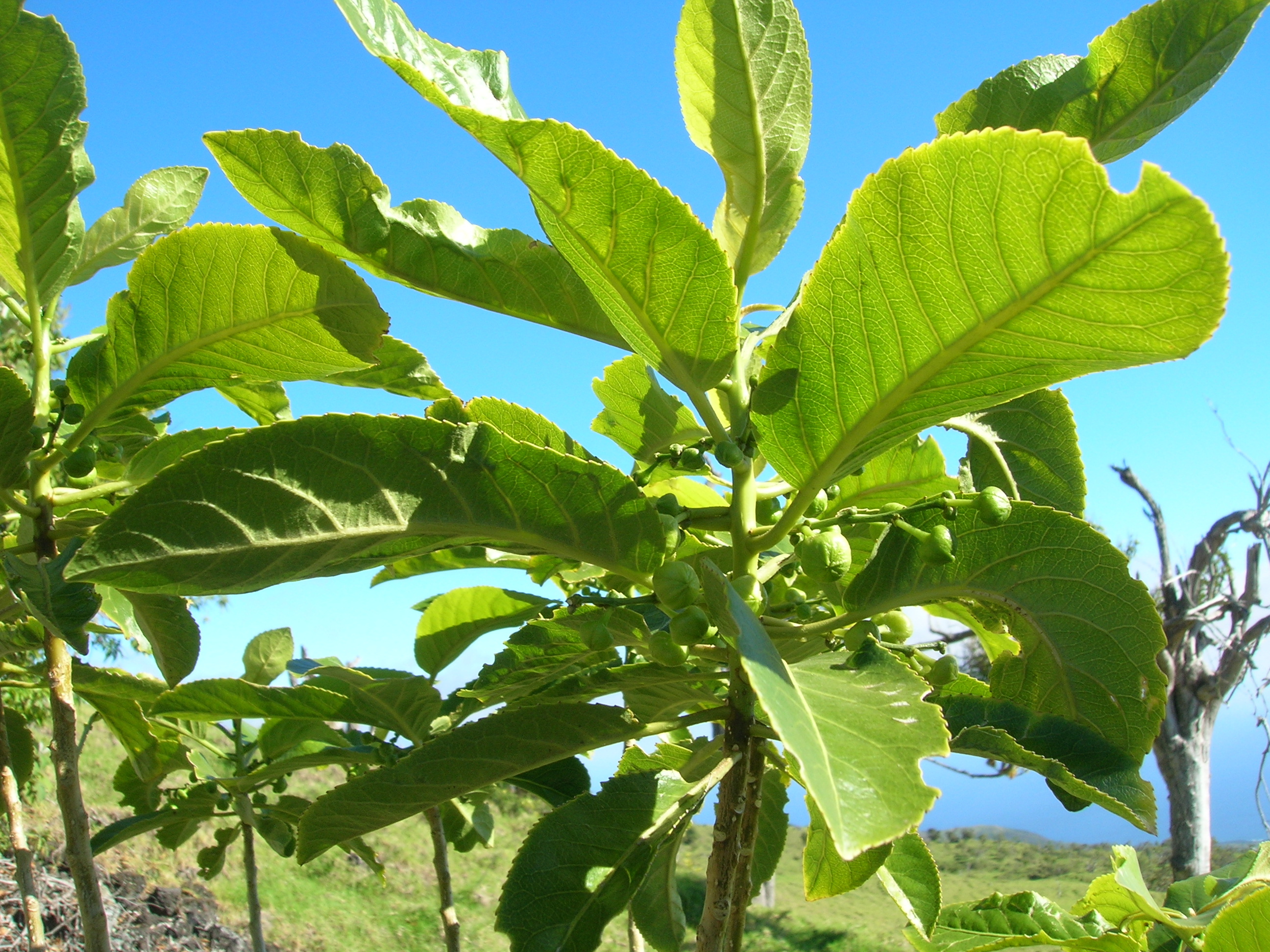
- Claoxylon sandwicense

Scientific classification
- Kingdom: Plantae
- Clade: Tracheophytes
- Clade: Angiosperms
- Clade: Eudicots
- Clade: Rosids
- Order: Malpighiales
- Family: Euphorbiaceae
- Subfamily: Acalyphoideae
- Tribe: Acalypheae
- Subtribe: Claoxylinae
- Genus: Claoxylon; A.Juss.

Type species
- Claoxylon parviflorum A.Juss.

Synonyms
- Erythrochilus Reinw. ex Blume; Erythrochylus Reinw. ex Blume, spelling variant; Quadrasia Elmer

= Claoxylon =

Genus of flowering plants

Claoxylon is a flowering plant genus in the spurge family, Euphorbiaceae, comprising dioecious subshrubs to small trees. It was first described as a genus in 1824. The genus is distributed in paleotropical areas: Madagascar through South and Southeast Asia, Malesia to Melanesia, Hawaiʻi, and Australia. Half of the species are in Malesia.

== Species ==
As of December 2024, the following 118 species are accepted by Plants of the World Online:

=== A ===
- Claoxylon abbreviatum J.J.Sm.
- Claoxylon affine Zoll. & Moritzi
- Claoxylon albicans (Blanco) Merr.
- Claoxylon albiflorum Pax & K.Hoffm.
- Claoxylon ambrense McPherson
- Claoxylon angustifolium Müll.Arg.
- Claoxylon anomalum Hook.f.
- Claoxylon arboreum Elmer
- Claoxylon attenuatum Airy Shaw
- Claoxylon australe Baill.

=== B ===
- Claoxylon bicarpellatum K.Schum. & Lauterb.
- Claoxylon biciliatum Guillaumin
- Claoxylon brachyandrum Pax & K.Hoffm.

=== C ===
- Claoxylon capillipes Airy Shaw
- Claoxylon carinatum Airy Shaw
- Claoxylon carolinianum Pax & K.Hoffm.
- Claoxylon carrii Airy Shaw
- Claoxylon centenarium Koidz.
- Claoxylon colfsii Airy Shaw
- Claoxylon collenettei L.Riley
- Claoxylon coriaceolanatum Airy Shaw
- Claoxylon crassipes Pax & K.Hoffm.
- Claoxylon crassivenium Pax & K.Hoffm.
- Claoxylon cuneatum J.J.Sm.

=== D ===
- Claoxylon decaryanum Leandri
- Claoxylon dipulvinum Setiawan
- Claoxylon dolichostachyum Cordem.

=== E ===
- Claoxylon echinospermum Müll.Arg.
- Claoxylon ellipticum Merr.
- Claoxylon erythrophyllum Miq.
- Claoxylon euphorbioides (Elmer) Merr.
- Claoxylon extenuatum Airy Shaw

=== F ===
- Claoxylon fallax Müll.Arg.
- Claoxylon flavum Scott Elliot
- Claoxylon fulvescens Airy Shaw

=== G ===
- Claoxylon gillisonii Airy Shaw
- Claoxylon glabrifolium Miq.
- Claoxylon glandulosum Boivin ex Baill.
- Claoxylon goodenoviense Airy Shaw
- Claoxylon grandifolium (Poir.) Müll.Arg.
- Claoxylon gymnadenum Airy Shaw

=== H ===
- Claoxylon hainanense Pax & K.Hoffm.
- Claoxylon hillii Benth.
- Claoxylon hirsutellum Airy Shaw
- Claoxylon hosei (Merr.) Airy Shaw
- Claoxylon humbertii Leandri

=== I ===
- Claoxylon indicum (Reinw. ex Blume) Hassk.
- Claoxylon insigne Airy Shaw
- Claoxylon insulanum Müll.Arg.

=== K ===
- Claoxylon kaievskii Airy Shaw
- Claoxylon khasianum Hook.f.
- Claoxylon kinabaluense Airy Shaw
- Claoxylon kingii Hook.f. ex Ridl.

=== L ===
- Claoxylon lambiricum Airy Shaw
- Claoxylon langbiangense A.Nagah. & Tagane
- Claoxylon ledermannii Airy Shaw
- Claoxylon linostachys Baill.
- Claoxylon longifolium (Blume) Endl. ex Hassk.
- Claoxylon longipetiolatum Kurz
- Claoxylon longiracemosum Hosok.
- Claoxylon lutescens Pax & K.Hoffm.

=== M ===
- Claoxylon macranthum Müll.Arg.
- Claoxylon mananarense Leandri
- Claoxylon marianum Müll.Arg.
- Claoxylon medullosum Baill.
- Claoxylon microcarpum Airy Shaw
- Claoxylon monoicum Baill.
- Claoxylon montanum Whistler
- Claoxylon muscisilvae Airy Shaw

=== N ===
- Claoxylon neoebudicum (Guillaumin) Airy Shaw
- Claoxylon nervosum Pax & K.Hoffm.
- Claoxylon nigtanig Airy Shaw
- Claoxylon nubicola Airy Shaw

=== O ===
- Claoxylon oblanceolatum (Merr.) Pax & K.Hoffm.
- Claoxylon oliganthum Airy Shaw
- Claoxylon ooumuense Fosberg & Sachet

=== P ===
- Claoxylon papuae Airy Shaw
- Claoxylon parviflorum A.Juss.
- Claoxylon paucinerve Airy Shaw
- Claoxylon perrieri Leandri
- Claoxylon physocarpum Airy Shaw
- Claoxylon platyphyllum Airy Shaw
- Claoxylon porphyrostemon Airy Shaw
- Claoxylon praetermissum Airy Shaw
- Claoxylon pseudoinsulanum Pax & K.Hoffm.
- Claoxylon psilogyne Airy Shaw
- Claoxylon pubescens Quisumb.
- Claoxylon purpureum Merr.
- Claoxylon putii Airy Shaw

=== R ===
- Claoxylon racemiflorum Baill.
- Claoxylon raymondianum Leandri
- Claoxylon rostratum Airy Shaw
- Claoxylon rubescens Miq.
- Claoxylon rubrivenium Pax & K.Hoffm.

=== S ===
- Claoxylon salicinum Airy Shaw
- Claoxylon salomonense Airy Shaw
- Claoxylon samoense Pax & K.Hoffm.
- Claoxylon sanctae-crucis Airy Shaw
- Claoxylon sandwicense Müll.Arg.
- Claoxylon sarasinorum Pax & K.Hoffm.
- Claoxylon scabratum (Pax & K.Hoffm.) Airy Shaw
- Claoxylon setosum Coode
- Claoxylon spathulatum Pax & K.Hoffm.
- Claoxylon stapfianum Airy Shaw
- Claoxylon stylosum McPherson
- Claoxylon subbullatum Airy Shaw
- Claoxylon subsessiliflorum Croizat
- Claoxylon subviride Elmer

=== T ===
- Claoxylon taitense Müll.Arg.
- Claoxylon tenerifolium (F.Muell. ex Baill.) F.Muell.
- Claoxylon tenuiflorum Airy Shaw
- Claoxylon tetracoccum Airy Shaw
- Claoxylon tsaratananae Leandri

=== V ===
- Claoxylon velutinum J.J.Sm.
- Claoxylon vitiense Gillespie

=== W ===
- Claoxylon wallichianum Müll.Arg.
- Claoxylon warburgianum Pax & K.Hoffm.
- Claoxylon winkleri Pax & K.Hoffm.

== Formerly included ==
Moved to other genera (Acalypha, Croton, Discoclaoxylon, Erythrococca, Lobanilia, Macaranga, Mallotus, Micrococca, Orfilea)

1. C. africanum - Erythrococca africana
2. C. angolense - Erythrococca angolense
3. C. atrovirens - Erythrococca atrovirens
4. C. bakerianum - Lobanilia bakeriana
5. C. barteri - Erythrococca africana
6. C. beddomei - Micrococca beddomei
7. C. capense - Micrococca capensis
8. C. chevalieri - Erythrococca chevalieri
9. C. columnare - Erythrococca columnaris
10. C. cordifolium - Mallotus oppositifolius
11. C. deflersii - Erythrococca abyssinica
12. C. dewevrei - Erythrococca dewevrei
13. C. digynum - Macaranga digyna
14. C. flaccidum - Erythrococca atrovirens
15. C. hexandrum - Discoclaoxylon hexandrum
16. C. hirsutum - Micrococca wightii var. hirsuta
17. C. hirtellum - Lobanilia hirtella
18. C. hispidum - Erythrococca hispida
19. C. holstii - Micrococca holstii
20. C. humblotianum - Micrococca humblotiana
21. C. inaequilaterum - Erythrococca atrovirens
22. C. kirkii - Erythrococca kirkii
23. C. lancifolium - Micrococca lancifolia
24. C. lasiococcum - Erythrococca trichogyne
25. C. leucocarpum - Mallotus leucocarpus
26. C. longifolium Baill. 1858, illegitimate homonym, not (Blume) Endl. ex Hassk. 1844 - Micrococca oligandra
27. C. luteobrunneum - Lobanilia luteobrunnea
28. C. macrophyllum Prain 1911, illegitimate homonym, not Hassk. 1848 - Erythrococca macrophylla
29. C. mannii - Erythrococca mannii
30. C. membranaceum - Erythrococca membranacea
31. C. menyharthii - Erythrococca menyharthii
32. C. mercurialis - Micrococca mercurialis
33. C. mildbraedii - Erythrococca trichogyne
34. C. molleri - Erythrococca molleri
35. C. muricatum - Mallotus resinosus
36. C. neraudianum - Orfilea neraudiana
37. C. occidentale - Discoclaoxylon occidentale
38. C. oleraceum - Erythrococca atrovirens
39. C. oligandrum - Micrococca oligandra
40. C. ovale - Lobanilia ovalis
41. C. patulum - Erythrococca patula
42. C. pauciflorum Müll.Arg. 1864 not Stapf 1894 - Erythrococca pauciflora
43. C. pedicellare Müll.Arg. 1864 not Pax & K.Hoffm. 1914 - Discoclaoxylon pedicellare
44. C. poggei - Erythrococca poggei
45. C. polyandrum - Erythrococca polyandra
46. C. preussii - Discoclaoxylon hexandrum
47. C. purpurascens - Erythrococca molleri
48. C. reticulatum - Acalypha filiformis
49. C. rivulare - Erythrococca rivularis
50. C. schweinfurthii - Erythrococca atrovirens
51. C. sphaerocarpum - Croton sylvaticus
52. C. spiciflorum - Acalypha spiciflora
53. C. stipulosum - Mallotus dispar
54. C. trichogyne - Erythrococca trichogyne
55. C. triste - Erythrococca tristis
56. C. virens - Erythrococca menyharthii
57. C. volkensii - Micrococca volkensii
58. C. welwitschianum - Erythrococca welwitschiana
59. C. wightii - Micrococca wightii
