= Brittlewood =

Brittlewood is a common name for several plants and may refer to:

- Claoxylon australe, native to Australia
- Nuxia congesta, native to Africa
