= Mallotojaponin =

Mallotojaponin refers to two types of phlorogucinols.

- Mallotojaponin B
- Mallotojaponin C
