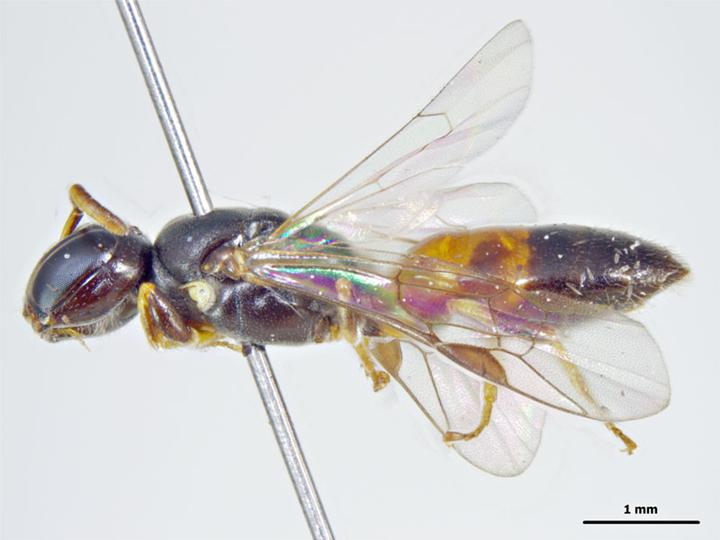
- Female

Scientific classification
- Kingdom: Animalia
- Phylum: Arthropoda
- Clade: Pancrustacea
- Class: Insecta
- Order: Hymenoptera
- Family: Colletidae
- Genus: Hylaeus
- Species: H. ofarrelli

Binomial name
- Hylaeus ofarrelli Michener, 1965

= Hylaeus ofarrelli =

Species of bee

Hylaeus ofarrelli, or Hylaeus (Edriohylaeus) ofarrelli, also known as O'Farrell's Masked Bee, is a species of bee in the family Colletidae and subfamily Hylaeinae. It is endemic to Australia. It was described by American entomologist Charles Duncan Michener in 1965.

== Etymology ==
The specific epithet ofarrelli honours Professor A. P. O'Farrell of the University of New England for his assistance to the author.

== Description ==
Male body length is about 3.7 mm, wing length 2.5 mm; female body length about 3.8 mm, wing length 3 mm. Integumental colouration is mainly black, with white to yellow markings; the base of the female metasoma is red.

== Distribution and habitat ==
The species occurs in eastern Australia. The type locality is Binna Burra in the Scenic Rim Region of south-east Queensland.

== Behaviour ==
The adults are solitary flying mellivores. They nest in dead reeds and plant stems, including those of Verbena bonariensis. Flowering plants visited by the bees include Claoxylon australe, as well as Callistemon, Eucalyptus, Jacksonia, Leptospermum, Melaleuca and Syncarpia species.

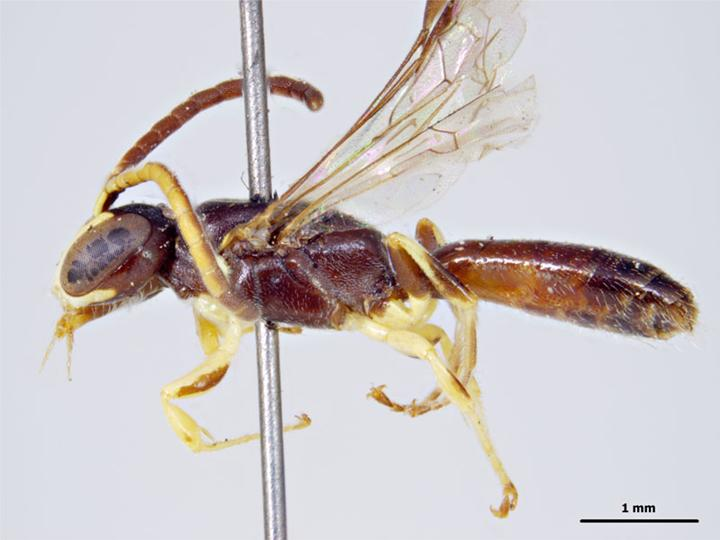
Male

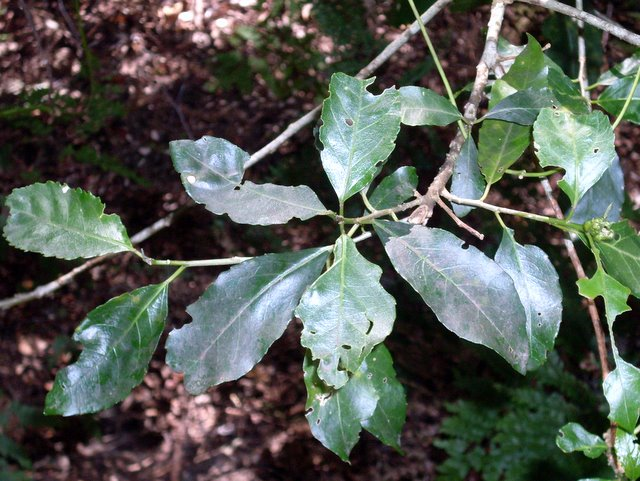
Claoxylon australe (brittlewood), a forage plant of the bees
