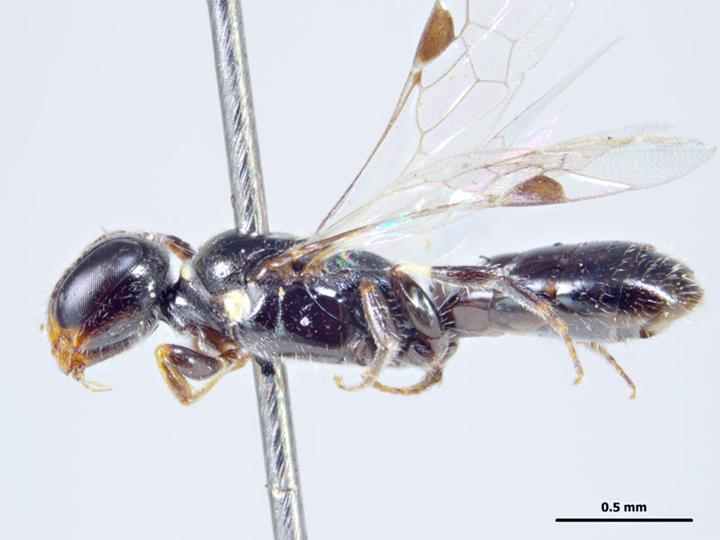
- Female

Scientific classification
- Kingdom: Animalia
- Phylum: Arthropoda
- Clade: Pancrustacea
- Class: Insecta
- Order: Hymenoptera
- Family: Colletidae
- Genus: Hylaeus
- Species: H. halictiformis

Binomial name
- Hylaeus halictiformis (Perkins, 1912)

Synonyms
- Heterapis halictiformis Perkins, 1912; Prosopis pulchripes Cockerell, 1914; Heterapis hackeriella Cockerell, 1929

= Hylaeus halictiformis =

Species of bee

Hylaeus halictiformis, or Hylaeus (Heterapoides) halictiformis, is a species of bee in the family Colletidae and subfamily Hylaeinae. It is endemic to Australia. It was described by British entomologist Robert Cyril Layton Perkins in 1912.

== Description ==
Male body length is about 3 mm. Integumental colouration is mainly black, with yellow markings.

== Distribution and habitat ==
The species occurs in eastern mainland Australia. Type localities include Bundaberg and Brisbane in Queensland.

== Behaviour ==
The adults are flying mellivores. Flowering plants visited by the bees include Alphitonia, Angophora, Boronia, Bursaria, Callistemon, Calytrix, Claoxylon, Jacksonia, Leptospermum, Lomatia, Loranthus, Melaleuca and Xanthorrhoea species.
