= Cieca =

Cieca may refer to:

- Cieca Adans., a synonym of the plant genus Croton
- Cieca Medik., a synonym of the plant genus Passiflora
