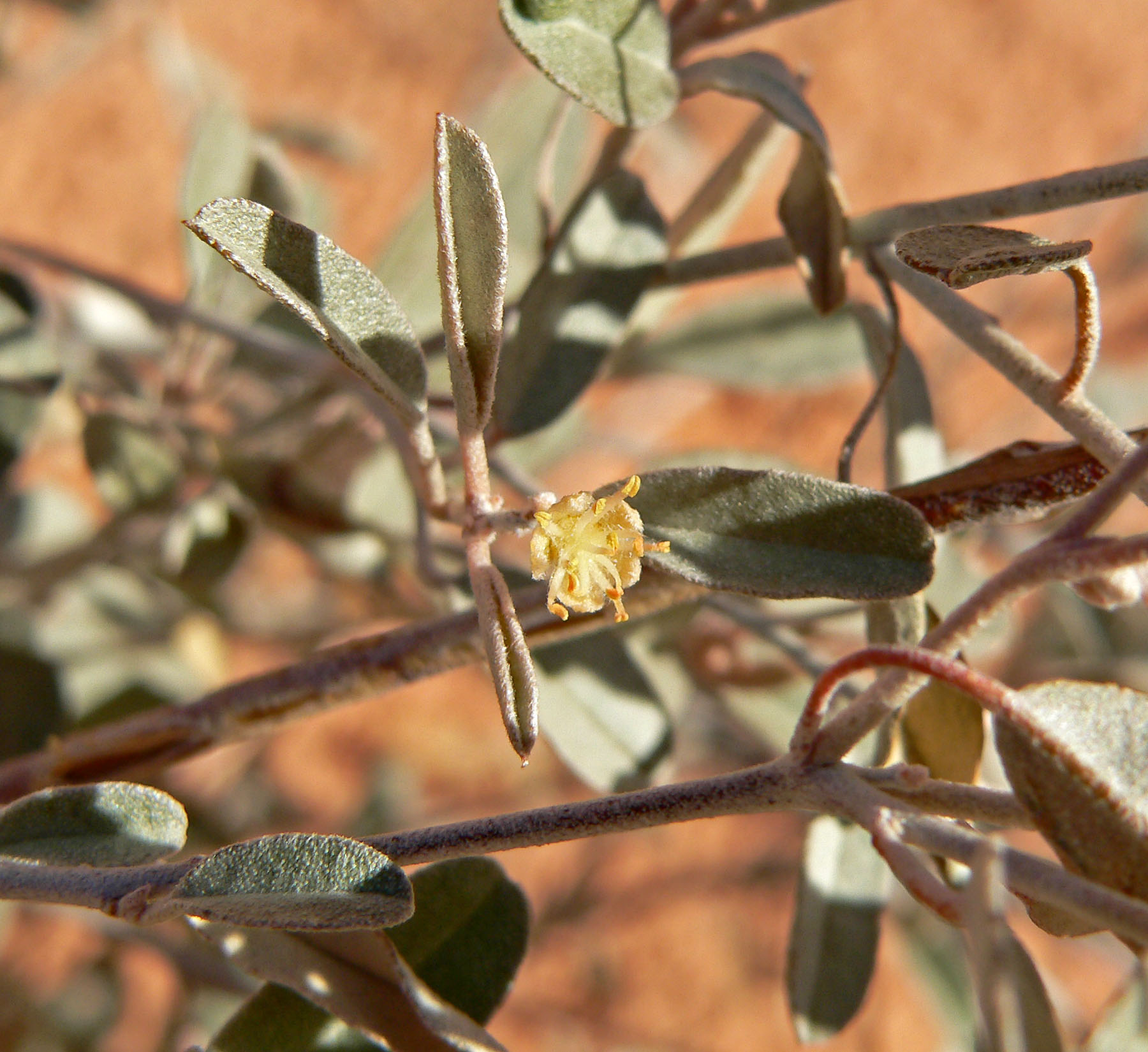
- Croton californicus

Scientific classification
- Kingdom: Plantae
- Clade: Tracheophytes
- Clade: Angiosperms
- Clade: Eudicots
- Clade: Rosids
- Order: Malpighiales
- Family: Euphorbiaceae
- Subfamily: Crotonoideae
- Tribe: Crotoneae
- Genus: Croton; L.

Sections
- See text

Diversity
- Over 1,100 species

Synonyms
- List: Aldinia Raf.; Angelandra Endl.; Anisepta Raf.; Anisophyllum Boivin ex Baill.; Argyra Noronha ex Baill.; Argyrodendron Klotzsch; Aroton Neck.; Astrogyne Benth.; Aubertia Chapel. ex Baill.; Banalia Raf.; Barhamia Klotzsch in B.Seemann; Brachystachys Klotzsch; Brunsvia Neck.; Calypteriopetalon Hassk.; Calyptriopetalum Hassk. ex Müll.Arg.; Cascarilla Adans.; Centrandra H.Karst.; Cieca Adans.; Cinogasum Neck.; Cleodora Klotzsch; Codonocalyx Klotzsch ex Baill.; Comatocroton H.Karst.; Crotonanthus Klotzsch ex Schltdl.; Crotonopsis Michx.; Cubacroton Alain; Cyclostigma Klotzsch in B.C.Seemann; Decarinium Raf.; Drepadenium Raf.; Elutheria L.; Engelmannia Klotzsch; Eremocarpus Benth.; Eutropia Klotzsch; Friesia Spreng.; Furcaria Boivin ex Baill.; Geiseleria Klotzsch; Gynamblosis Torr.; Halecus Rumph. ex Raf.; Hendecandra Eschsch.; Heptallon Raf.; Heptanis Raf.; Heterochlamys Turcz.; Heterocroton S.Moore; Julocroton Mart.; Klotzschiphytum Baill.; Kurkas Raf.; Lascadium Raf.; Lasiogyne Klotzsch; Leontia Rchb.; Leptemon Raf.; Leucadenia Klotzsch ex Baill.; Luntia Neck. ex Raf.; Macrocroton Klotzsch in M.R.Schomburgk; Medea Klotzsch; Megalocarpus Hutch.; Merleta Raf.; Moacroton Croizat; Monguia Chapel. ex Baill.; Myriogomphus Didr.; Ocalia Klotzsch; Oxydectes L. ex Kuntze; Palanostigma Mart. ex Klotzsch; Penteca Raf.; Pilinophytum Klotzsch; Piscaria Piper; Pleopadium Raf.; Podostachys Klotzsch; Saipania Hosok.; Schousboea Willd.; Schradera Willd.; Semilta Raf.; Tiglium Klotzsch; Timandra Klotzsch; Tridesmis Lour.; Triplandra Raf.; Vandera Raf.

= Croton (plant) =

Genus of flowering plants

Croton is an extensive plant genus in the spurge family, Euphorbiaceae. The plants of this genus were described and introduced to Europeans by Georg Eberhard Rumphius. The common names for this genus are rushfoil and croton, but the latter also refers to Codiaeum variegatum. The generic name comes from the Greek κρότος (krótos), which means "tick" and refers to the shape of the seeds of certain species.

== Description ==
Croton is a diverse and complex taxonomic group of plants ranging from herbs and shrubs to trees. A well-known member of this genus is Croton tiglium, a shrub native to Southeast Asia. It was first mentioned in European literature by Cristóbal Acosta in 1578 as "lignum pavanae". The oil, used in herbal medicine as a violent purgative, is extracted from its seeds. Currently, it is considered unsafe and it is no longer listed in the pharmacopeia of many countries.

== Taxonomy ==
=== Sections ===
The sections and subsections of the genus Croton:

1. sect. Cleodora (Klotzsch) Baill.?
2. sect. Cyclostigma Griseb.
  1. subsect. Cyclostigma (Griseb.) Müll. Arg.
  2. subsect. Sampatik G.L.Webster
  3. subsect. Palanostigma Mart. ex Baill.
3. sect. Klotzschiphytum (Baill.) Baill.
4. sect. Eutropia (Klotzsch) Baill.
5. sect. Luntia (Raf.) G.L. Webster
  1. subsect. Cuneati G.L. Webster
  2. subsect. Matourenses G.L. Webster
6. sect Eluteria Griseb.
7. sect. Croton
8. sect. Ocalia (Klotzsch) Baill.
9. sect. Corylocroton G.L.Webster
10. sect. Anadenocroton G.L.Webster
11. sect. Tiglium (Klotzsch) Baill.
12. sect. Quadrilobus Müll. Arg.
13. sect. Cascarilla Griseb.
14. sect. Velamea Baill.
15. sect. Andrichnia Baill.
16. sect. Anisophyllum Baill.
17. sect. Furcaria Boivin ex Baill.
18. sect. Monguia Baill.
19. sect. Decapetalon Müll. Arg.
20. sect. Podostachys (Klotzsch) Baill.
21. sect. Octolobium Chodat & Hassl.
22. sect. Geiseleria (Klotzsch) Baill.
23. sect. Pilinophyton (Klotzsch) A. Gray
24. sect. Eremocarpus (Benth.) G.L.Webster
25. sect. Gynamblosis (Torr.) A. Gray
26. sect. Crotonopsis (Michx.) G.L.Webster
27. sect. Argyrocroton (Müll. Arg.) G.L.Webster
28. sect. Lamprocroton (Müll. Arg.) Pax
29. sect. Julocroton (Mart.) G.L.Webster
30. sect. Adenophyllum Griseb.
31. sect. Barhamia (Klotzsch) Baill.
32. sect. Decalobium Müll. Arg.
33. sect. Micranthis Baill.
34. sect. Medea (Klotzsch) Baill.
35. sect. Lasiogyne (Klotzsch) Baill.
36. sect. Argyroglossum Baill.
37. sect. Astraeopsis Baill.
38. sect. Codonacalyx Klotzsch ex Baill.
39. sect. Astraea (Klotzsch) Baill.
40. sect. Drepadenium (Raf.) Müll. Arg.

== Uses ==
=== Food uses ===
Cascarilla (C. eluteria) bark is used to flavour the liquors Campari and Vermouth.

=== Biofuel uses ===
In Kenya, Croton nuts, such as those from C. megalocarpus, were found to be a more economical source of biofuel than Jatropha curcas. Jatropha curcas requires as much as 20,000 litres of water to make a litre of biofuel, while Croton trees grow wild and yield about 35 percent oil. Croton trees are planted as a windbreak in Kenya, and their use as a source of biofuel may benefit rural economies there. As arable land is under population pressure, people have been cutting down the windbreaks to expand farmland. This new use may save the windbreaks, which should help fight desertification.

== Ecology ==
Croton species are used as food plants by the larvae of some Lepidoptera species, including Schinia citrinellus, which feeds exclusively on the plant.

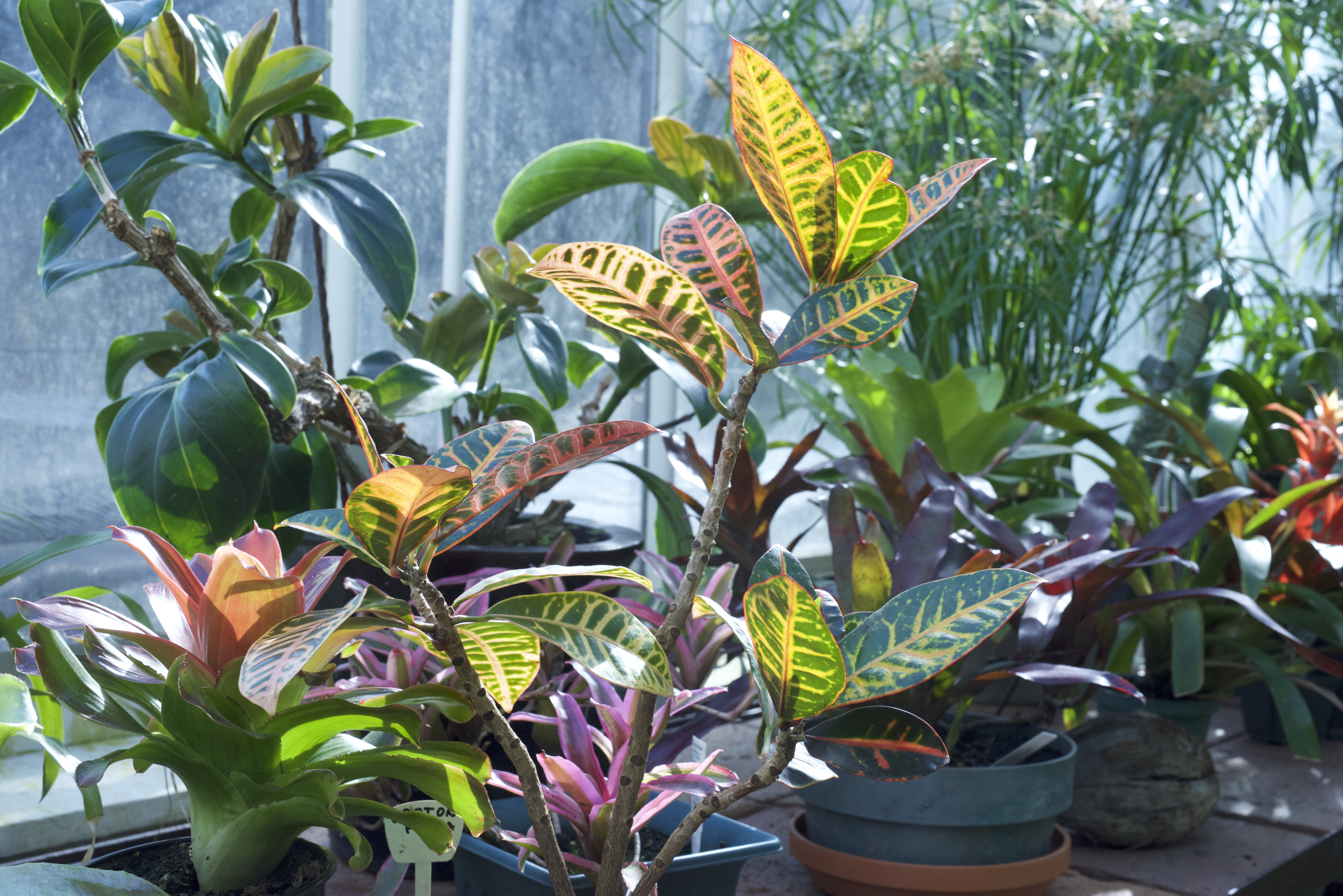
Codiaeum variegatum was formerly placed in the genus Croton

== Distribution ==
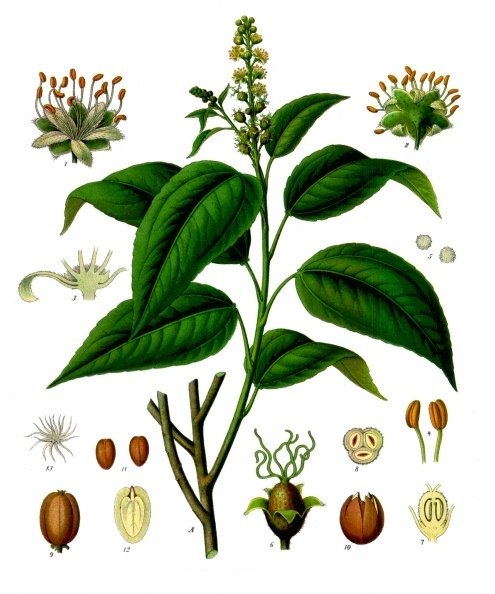
Croton tiglium

The genus is pantropical, with some species extending into temperate areas. It is one of the largest and most complex genera of angiosperms in Madagascar, where up to 150 Croton species are endemic.

== Formerly placed here ==
Species formerly placed in the genus Croton include:

- Acalypha chamaedrifolia (Lam.) Müll.Arg. (as C. chamaedrifolius Lam.)
- Astraea lobata (L.) Klotzsch (as C. lobatus L.)
- Caperonia palustris (L.) A.St.-Hil. (as C. palustris L.)
- Chrozophora plicata (Vahl) A.Juss. ex Spreng. (as C. plicatus Vahl)
- Claoxylon indicum (Reinw. ex Blume) Hassk. (as C. polot Burm.f.)
- Codiaeum variegatum (L.) A.Juss. (as C. variegatus L.)
- Homalanthus nutans (G.Forst.) Guill. (as C. nutans G.Forst.)
- Macaranga grandifolia (Blanco) Merr. (as C. grandifolius Blanco)
- Mallotus japonicus (L.f.) Müll.Arg. (as C. japonicus L.f.)
- Mallotus philippensis (Lam.) Müll.Arg. (as C. philippensis Lam.)
- Mallotus repandus (Rottler ex Willd.) Müll.Arg. (as C. repandus Rottler ex Willd.)
- Savia sessiliflora (Sw.) Willd. (as C. sessiliflorus Sw.)
- Terminalia bentzoe (L.) L.f. (as C. bentzoe L.)
- Triadica sebifera (L.) Small (as C. sebifer L.)
