= Deoptilia heptadeta =

Scientific classification
- Kingdom: Animalia
- Phylum: Arthropoda
- Class: Insecta
- Order: Lepidoptera
- Family: Gracillariidae
- Genus: Deoptilia
- Species: D. heptadeta

Binomial name
- Deoptilia heptadeta (Meyrick, 1936)

Synonyms
- Acrocercops hepladela Meyrick, 1936

Species of moth

Deoptilia heptadeta is a species of moth in the family Gracillariidae. It is known from Japan (the Ryukyu Islands, Kyūshū, Shikoku, Honshū, Tusima, the Amami Islands) and Taiwan.

The wingspan is 6.3–8.3 mm.

The larvae feed on Mallotus japonicus. They mine the leaves of their host plant.
