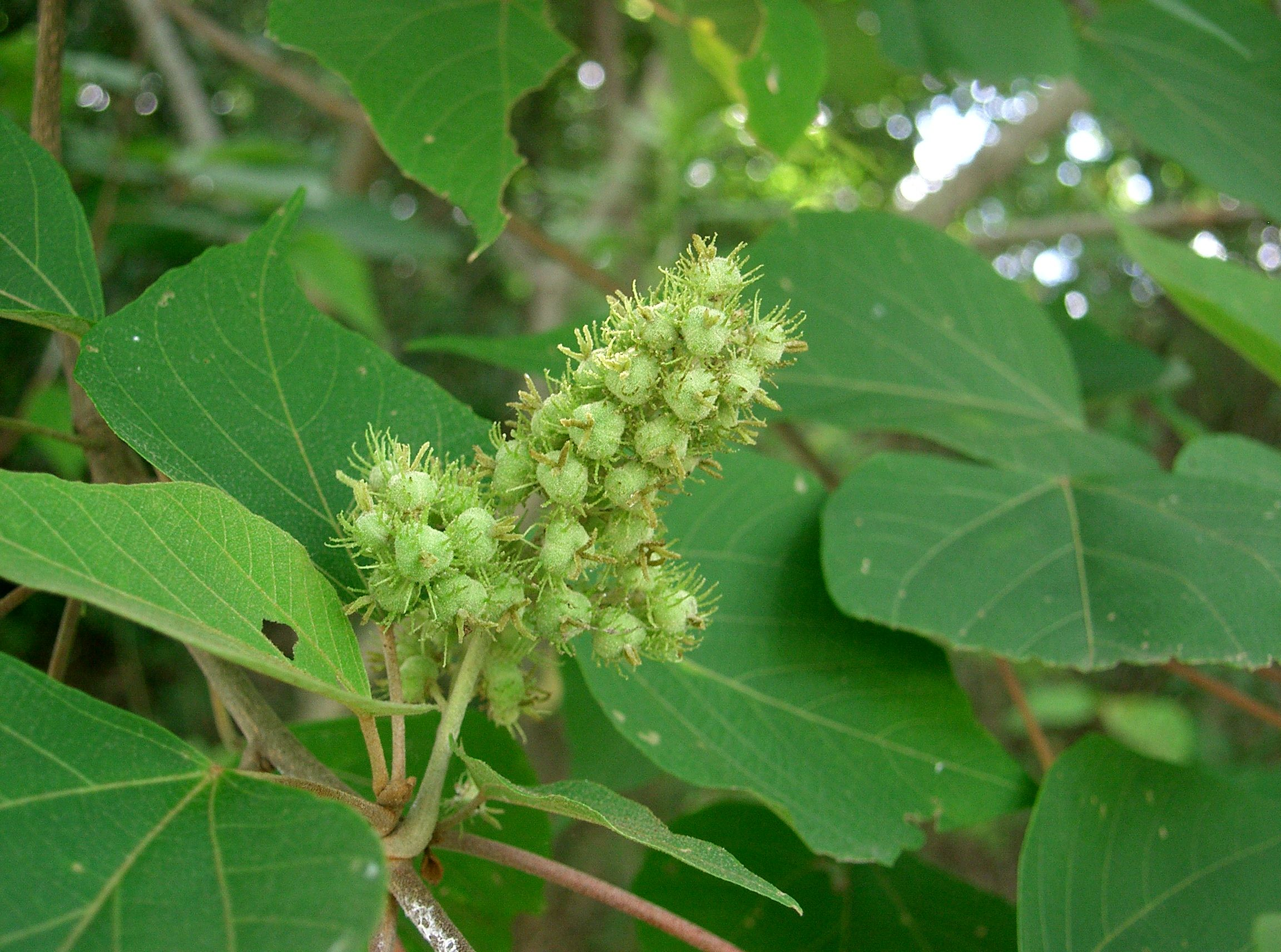
- Mallotus japonicus leaves and fruits

Scientific classification
- Kingdom: Plantae
- Clade: Tracheophytes
- Clade: Angiosperms
- Clade: Eudicots
- Clade: Rosids
- Order: Malpighiales
- Family: Euphorbiaceae
- Genus: Mallotus
- Species: M. japonicus

Binomial name
- Mallotus japonicus (L.f.) Müll.Arg.

Synonyms
- Croton japonicus L.f.; Rottlera japonica Spreng

= Mallotus japonicus =

Species of flowering plant

Mallotus japonicus (Chinese: 野梧桐), also known as East Asian mallotus, the food wrapper plant or "Akamegashiwa" in Japanese, is a plant species in the genus Mallotus native to China. It is also found in Japan and Korea. This species was first described in 1865, its name was verified by AAS Systematic Botanists on October 2, 2015.

The plant is dioecious. The young shoots are red-coloured. The larvae of the moth Deoptilia heptadeta mine the leaves to feed.

== Uses ==
The large leaves were used to wrap food. The young leaves, when boiled, are edible. The bark is used in the Japanese pharmacopoeia as a decoction against gastric ulcer, duodenal ulcer, gastric hyperacidity. In addition, the fruit has anthelmintic properties.

== Ecology ==
Mallotus japonicus shows physical, chemical, and biotic resistance traits against herbivores. Trichomes, which are produced on leaf surfaces, serve as a physical resistance trait. Pellucid dots, which also are present on leaf surfaces, typically contain toxic metabolic substances or essential oils and function as a chemical resistance trait. Furthermore, the plant bears extrafloral nectaries (EFNs) on its leaf edges and food bodies (pearl bodies) on its leaf and stem surfaces as biotic resistance traits. EFNs contain primary sugars, and food bodies are known as lipid-rich particles. These biotic traits attract ants, which remove herbivores from the plant. The plant can change its combination of defence traits in response to leaf age and abiotic habitat conditions.

== Chemistry ==
Mallotus japonicus contains bergenin. The pericarp contains mallotophenone, mallotochromene mallophenone, mallotojaponin, isomallotochromene and mallotochroman. The bark contains 11-O-galloylbergenin, 4-O-galloylbergenin and 11-O-galloyldemethylbergenin. The bark also contains the hydrolyzable tannins 1,2-di-O-galloyl-3,6-(R)-hexahydroxydiphenoyl-beta-D-glucose, 1-O-digalloyl-3,6-(R)-hexahydroxydiphenoyl-beta-D-glucose, 1-O-galloyl-2,4-elaeocarpusinoyl-3,6-(R)-valoneayl-beta-D-glucose (mallojaponin) and 1-O-galloyl-2,4-elaeocarpusinoyl-beta-D-glucose (mallonin) and mallotusinin.

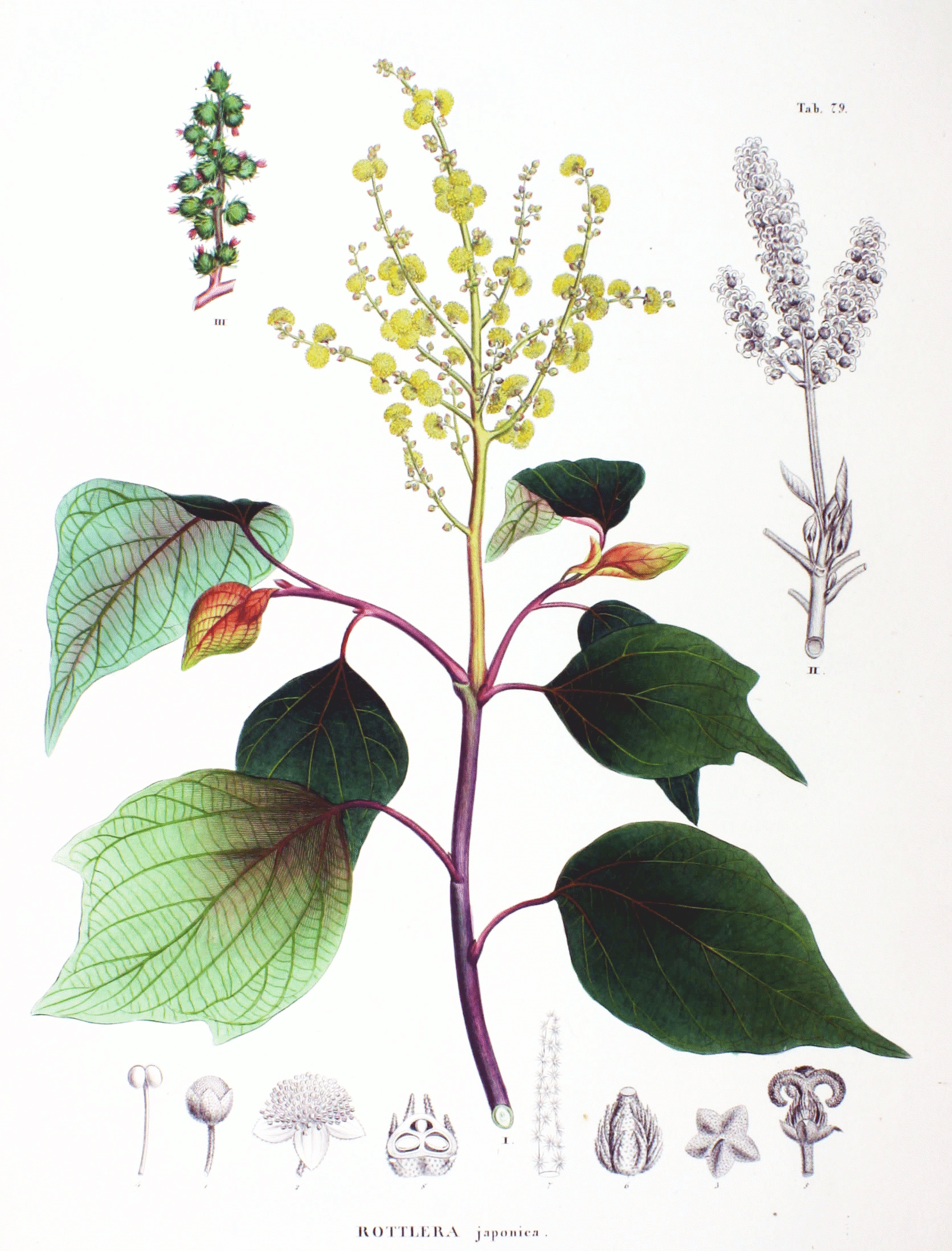
Mallotus japonicus. Plate from book Flora Japonica, Sectio Prima (Tafelband), 1870, by Philipp Franz von Siebold and Joseph Gerhard Zuccarini

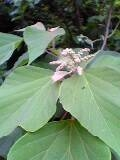

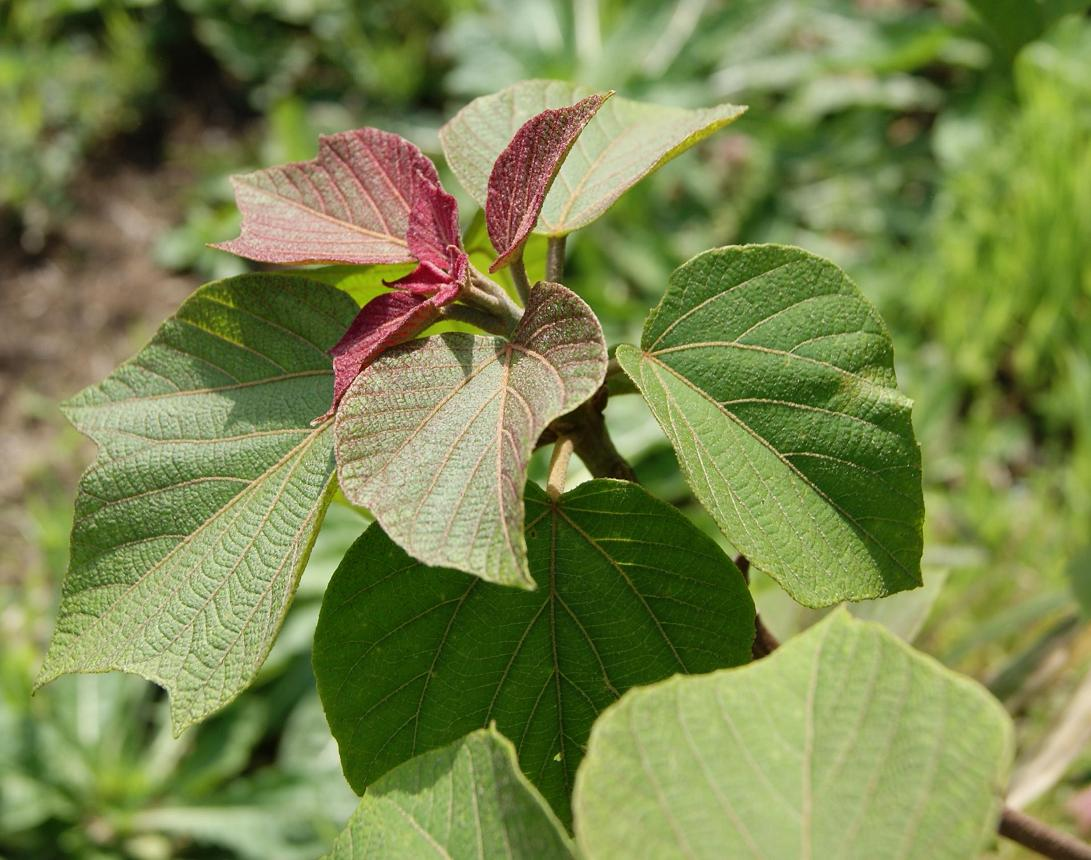
Young shoot

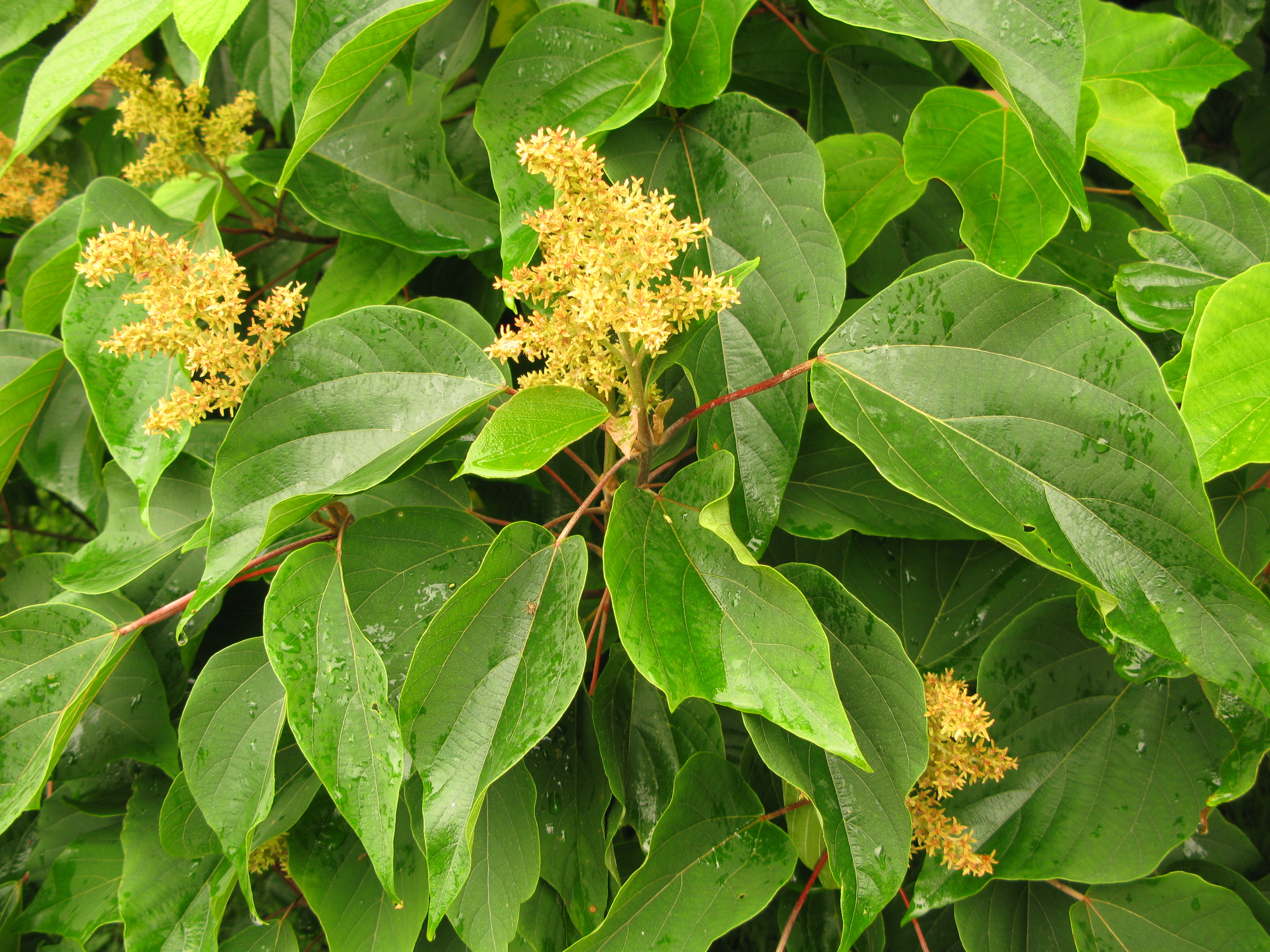
Female flowers

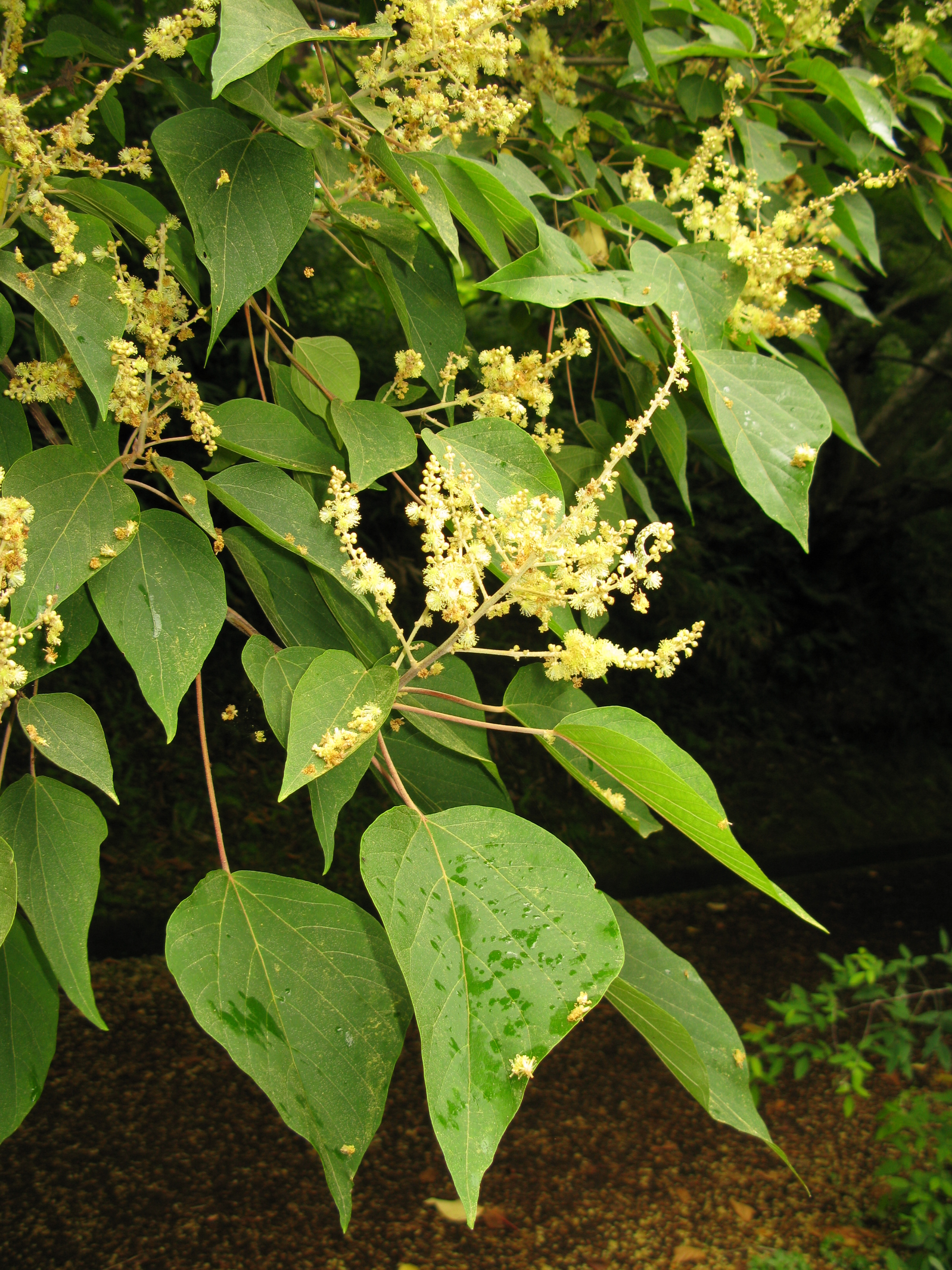
Male flowers

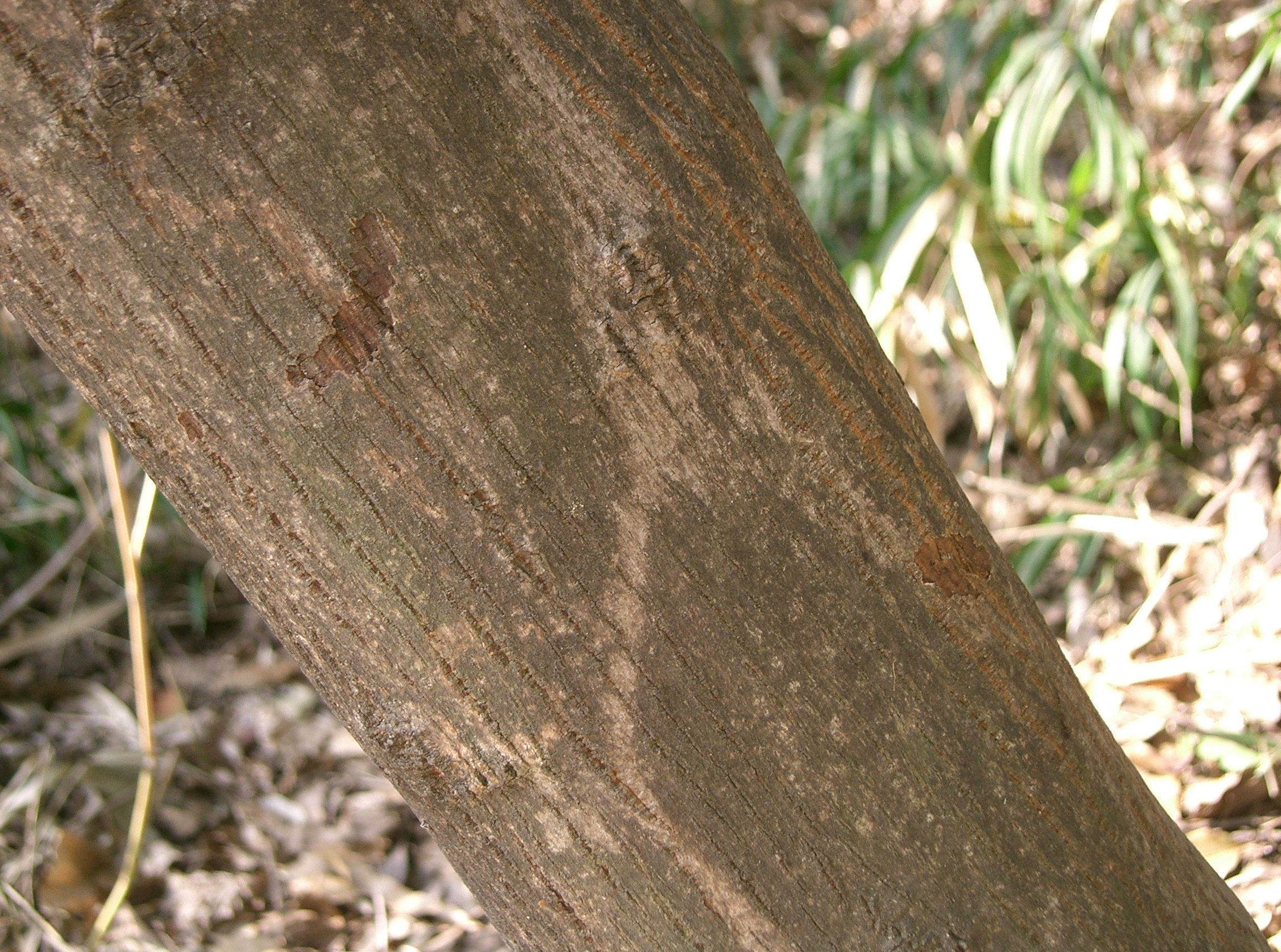
Bark
