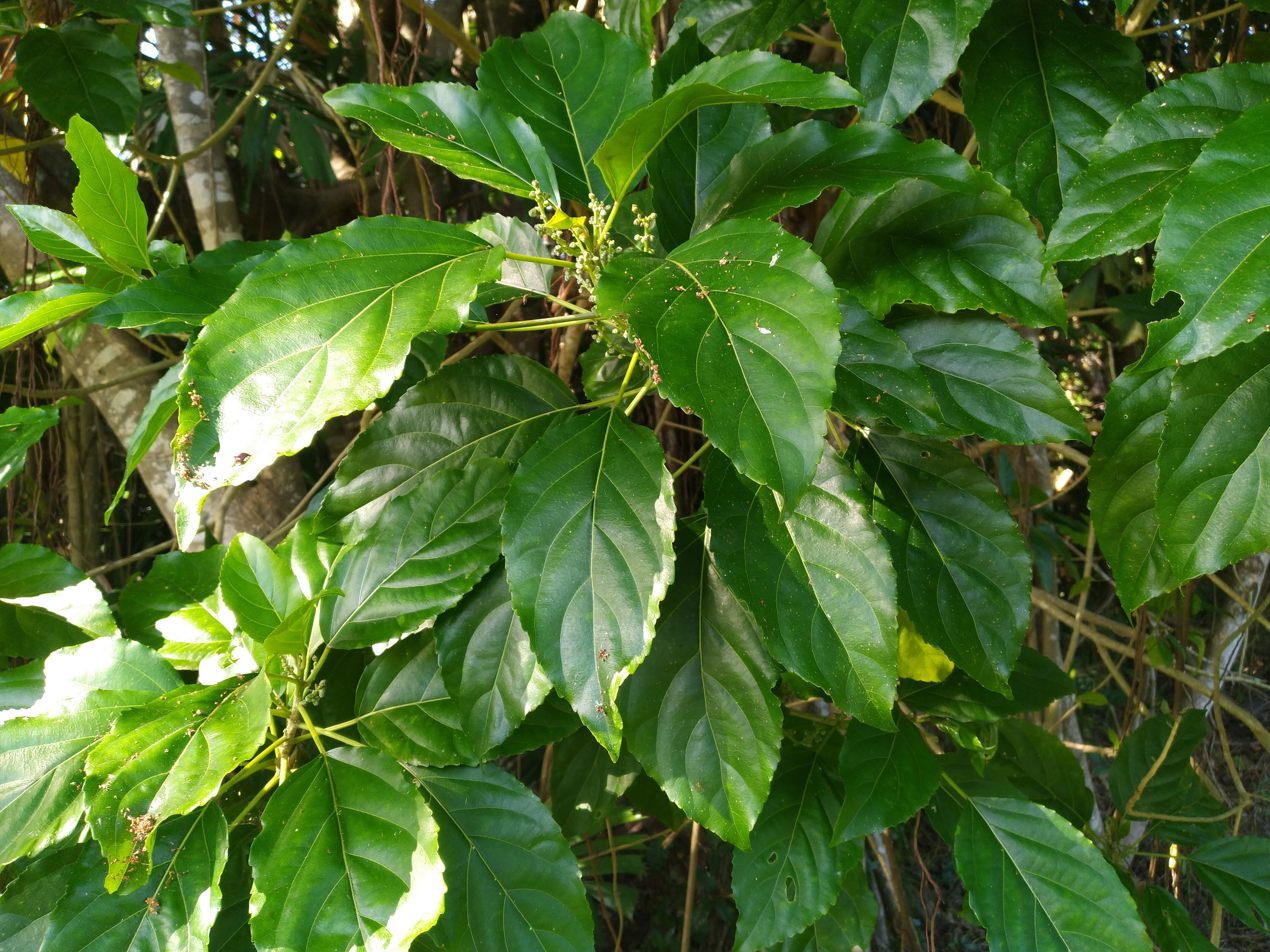
- In suburban Cairns

Conservation status
- Least Concern (IUCN 3.1)

Scientific classification
- Kingdom: Plantae
- Clade: Tracheophytes
- Clade: Angiosperms
- Clade: Eudicots
- Clade: Rosids
- Order: Malpighiales
- Family: Euphorbiaceae
- Genus: Claoxylon
- Species: C. hillii

Binomial name
- Claoxylon hillii Benth.

Synonyms
- Claoxylon delicatum Airy Shaw; Claoxylon indicum var. novoguineense J.J.Sm. ex Valeton

= Claoxylon hillii =

Species of flowering plant

Claoxylon hillii is a plant in the family Euphorbiaceae found in New Guinea and northern Australia. It is a small tree to 15 m (49 ft) tall, first described by English botanist George Bentham in 1873.

In Australia it is found in the Kimberly region of Western Australia, the Top End of the Northern Territory, and along the east coast of Cape York Peninsula in Queensland. It is also found in Papua New Guinea.

== Conservation ==
As of December 2024, this species has been assessed to be of least concern by the International Union for Conservation of Nature (IUCN) and by the Queensland Government under its Nature Conservation Act.

== Gallery ==
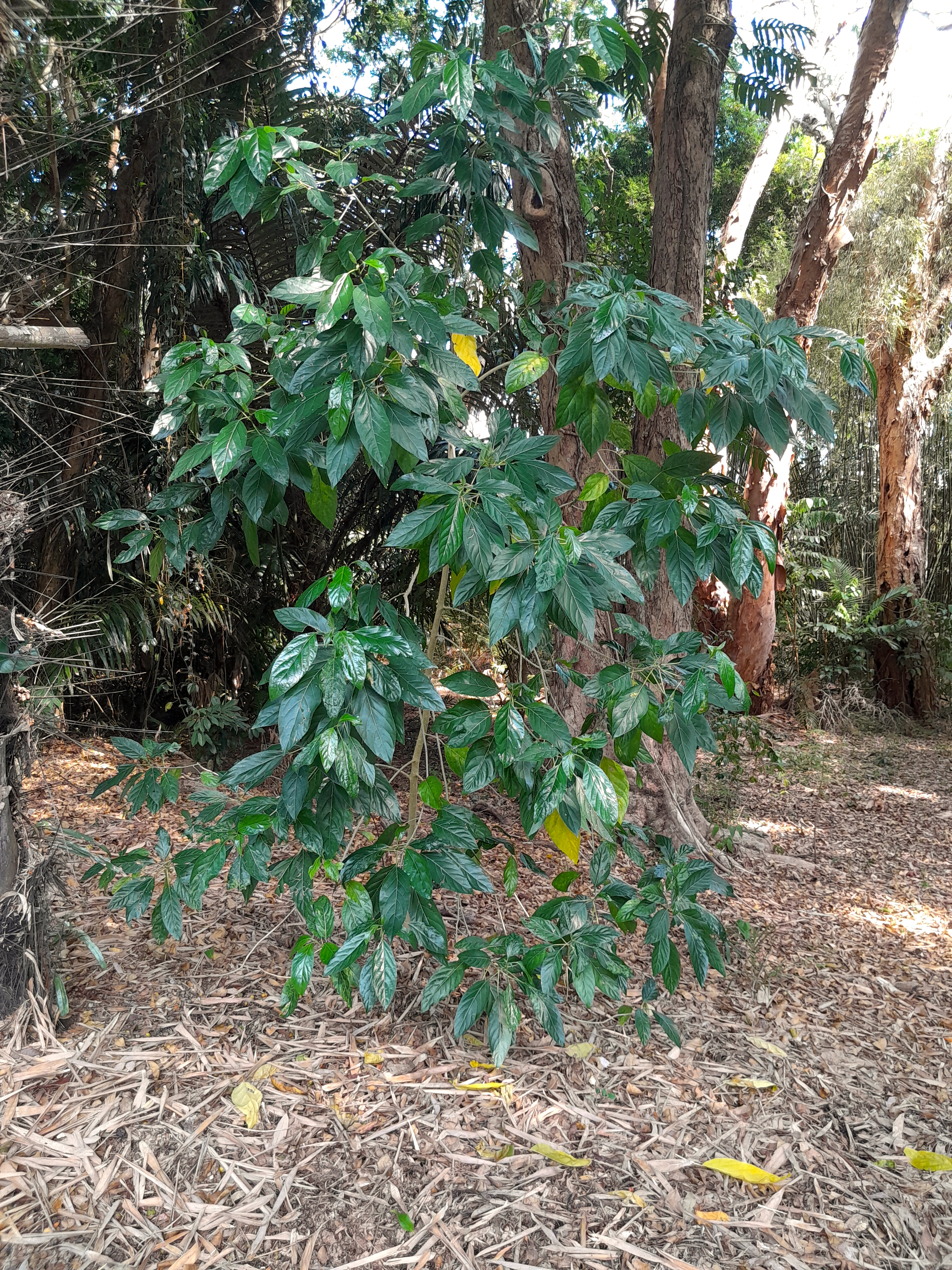
Habit

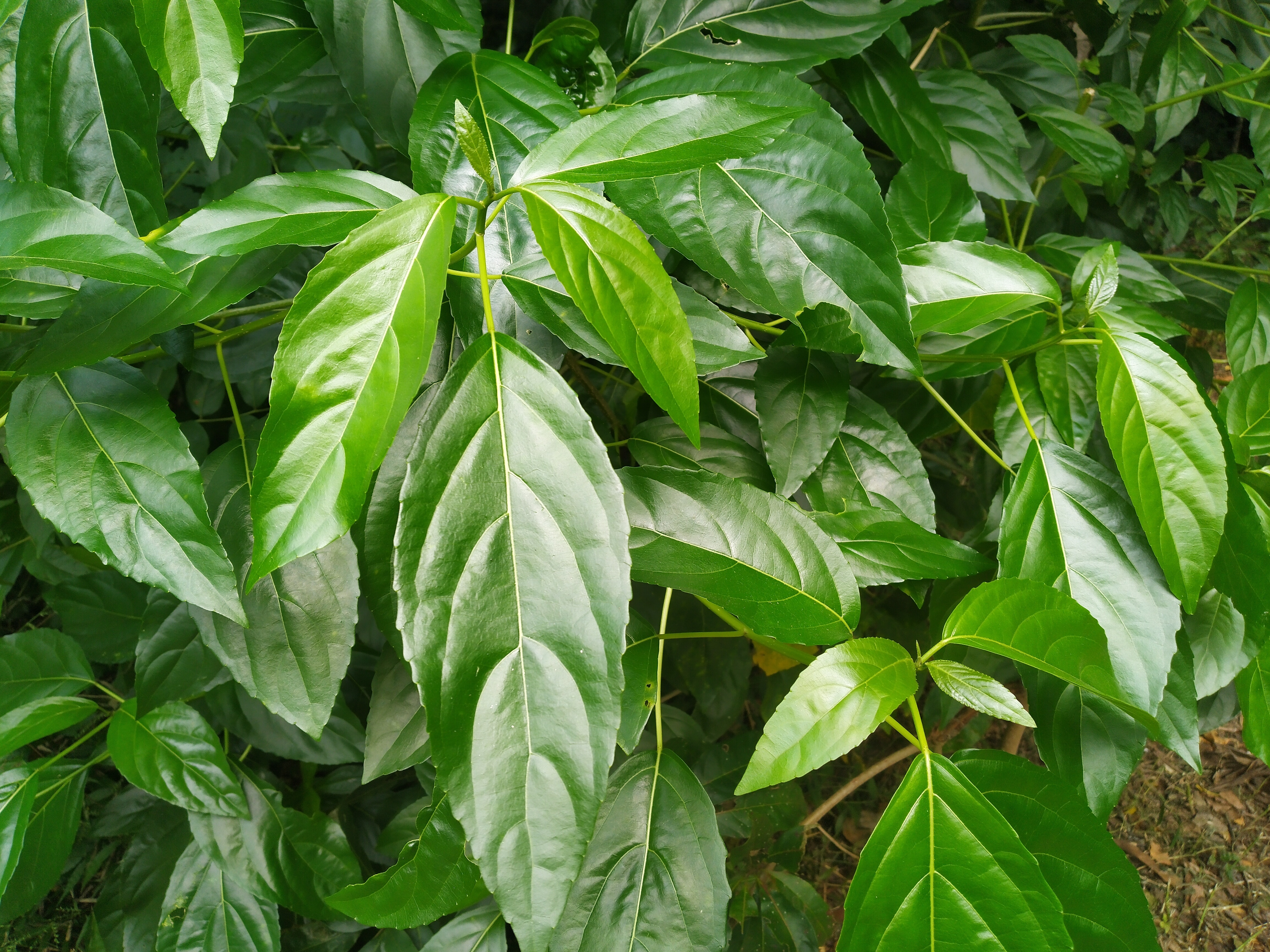
Glossy foliage

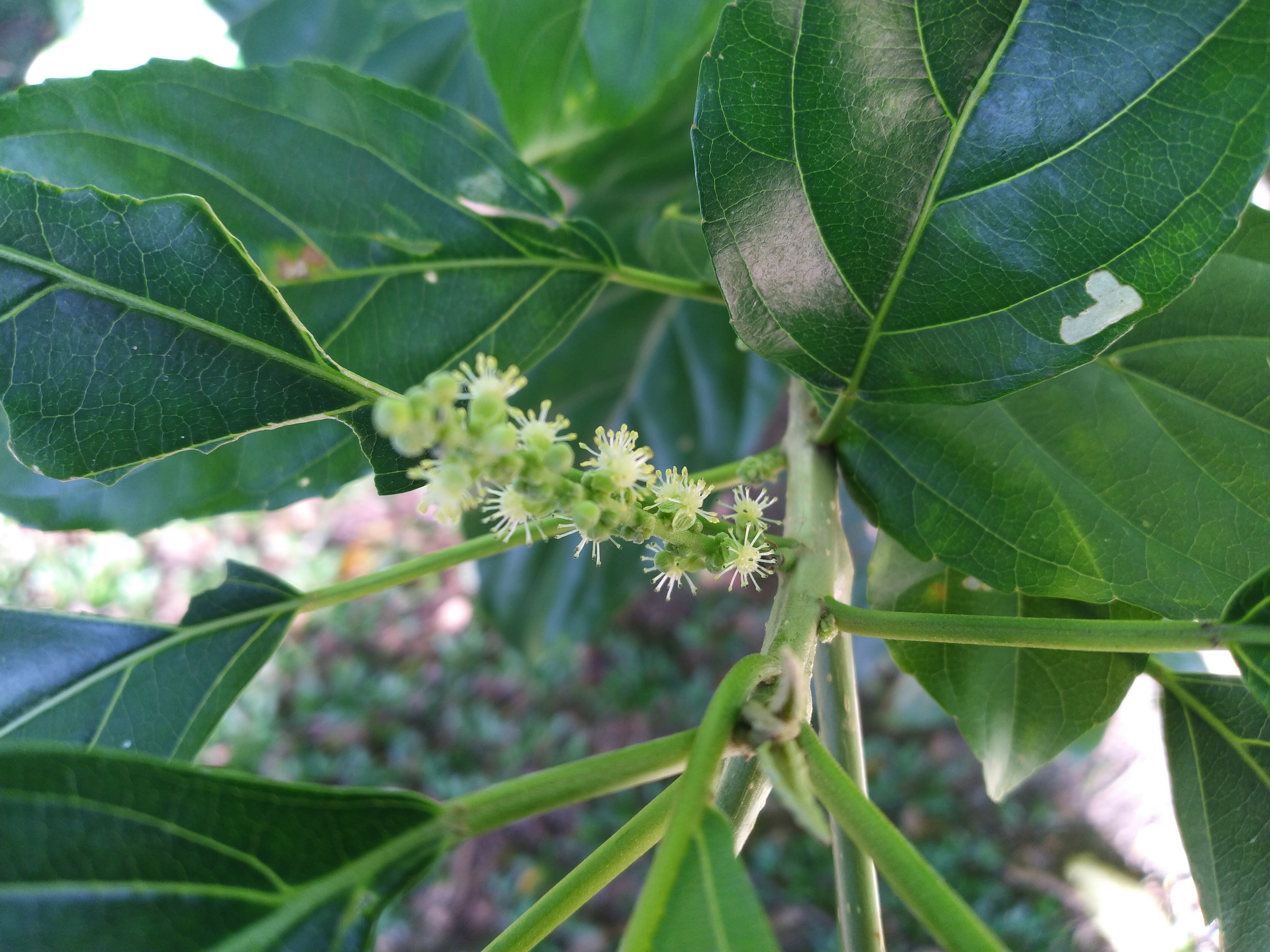
Flowers

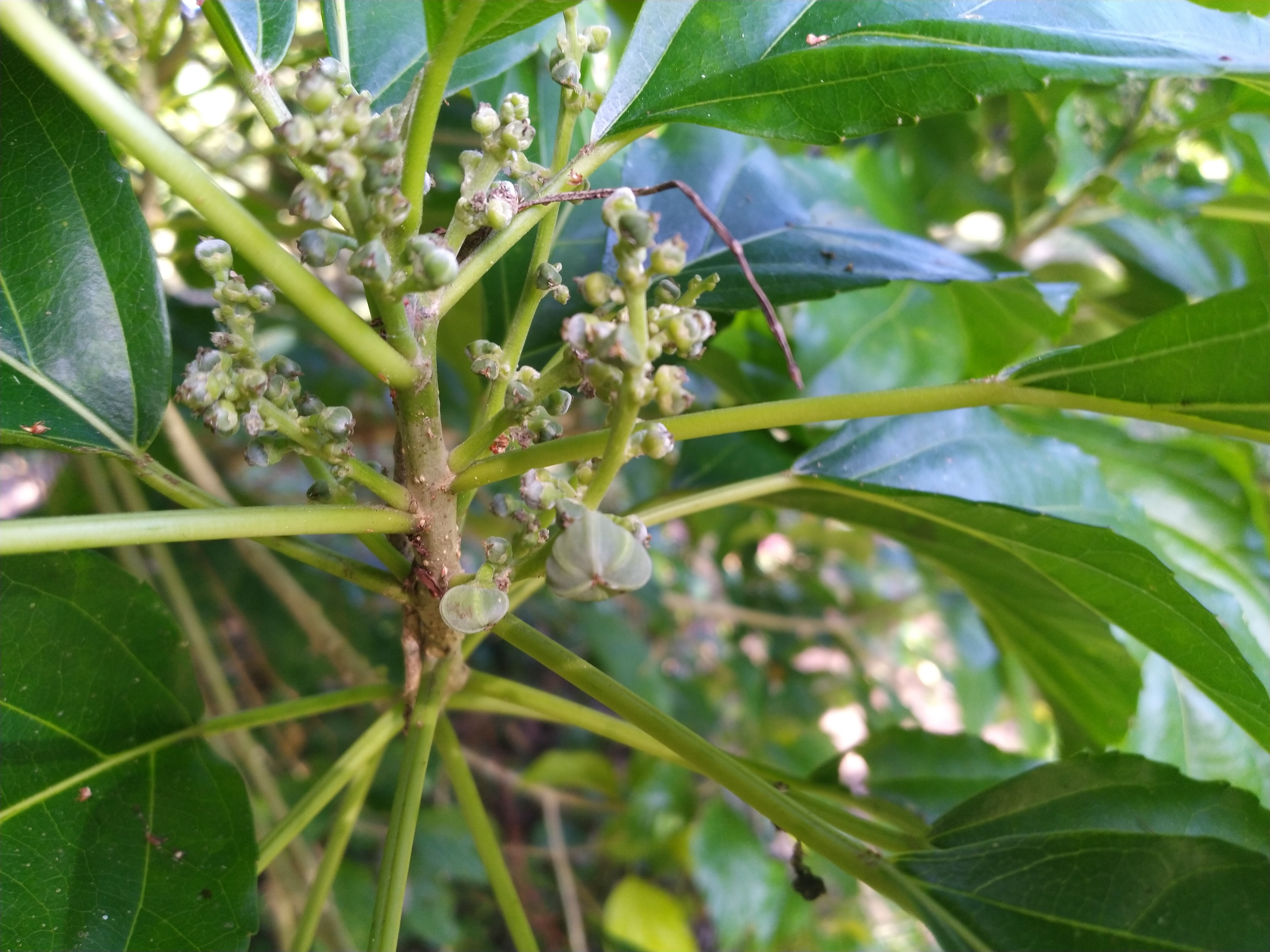
Immature fruit
