= Mallotochromene =

Names
- Preferred IUPAC name 1-{3-[(8-Acetyl-5,7-dihydroxy-2,2-dimethyl-2H-1-benzopyran-6-yl)methyl]-2,6-dihydroxy-4-methoxy-5-methylphenyl}ethan-1-one

Identifiers
CAS Number	98569-62-1
3D model (JSmol)	Interactive image
ChEBI	CHEBI:6656
ChEMBL	ChEMBL521361
ChemSpider	112743
KEGG	C09013
PubChem CID	126969
UNII	8Q7ZTX539B
CompTox Dashboard (EPA)	DTXSID60243719
- InChI: InChI=1S/C24H26O8/c1-10-18(27)16(11(2)25)21(30)15(22(10)31-6)9-14-19(28)13-7-8-24(4,5)32-23(13)17(12(3)26)20(14)29/h7-8,27-30H,9H2,1-6H3 Key: DIXWVWLWNGDQEC-UHFFFAOYSA-N; InChI=1/C24H26O8/c1-10-18(27)16(11(2)25)21(30)15(22(10)31-6)9-14-19(28)13-7-8-24(4,5)32-23(13)17(12(3)26)20(14)29/h7-8,27-30H,9H2,1-6H3 Key: DIXWVWLWNGDQEC-UHFFFAOYAB
- SMILES: CC1=C(C(=C(C(=C1O)C(=O)C)O)CC2=C(C3=C(C(=C2O)C(=O)C)OC(C=C3)(C)C)O)OC

Properties
Chemical formula	C_{24}H_{26}O_{8}
Molar mass	442.464 g·mol^{−1}
- Except where otherwise noted, data are given for materials in their standard state (at 25 °C [77 °F], 100 kPa). Infobox references

Mallotochromene is a phloroglucinol derivative found in the pericarp of the fruits of Mallotus japonicus.
