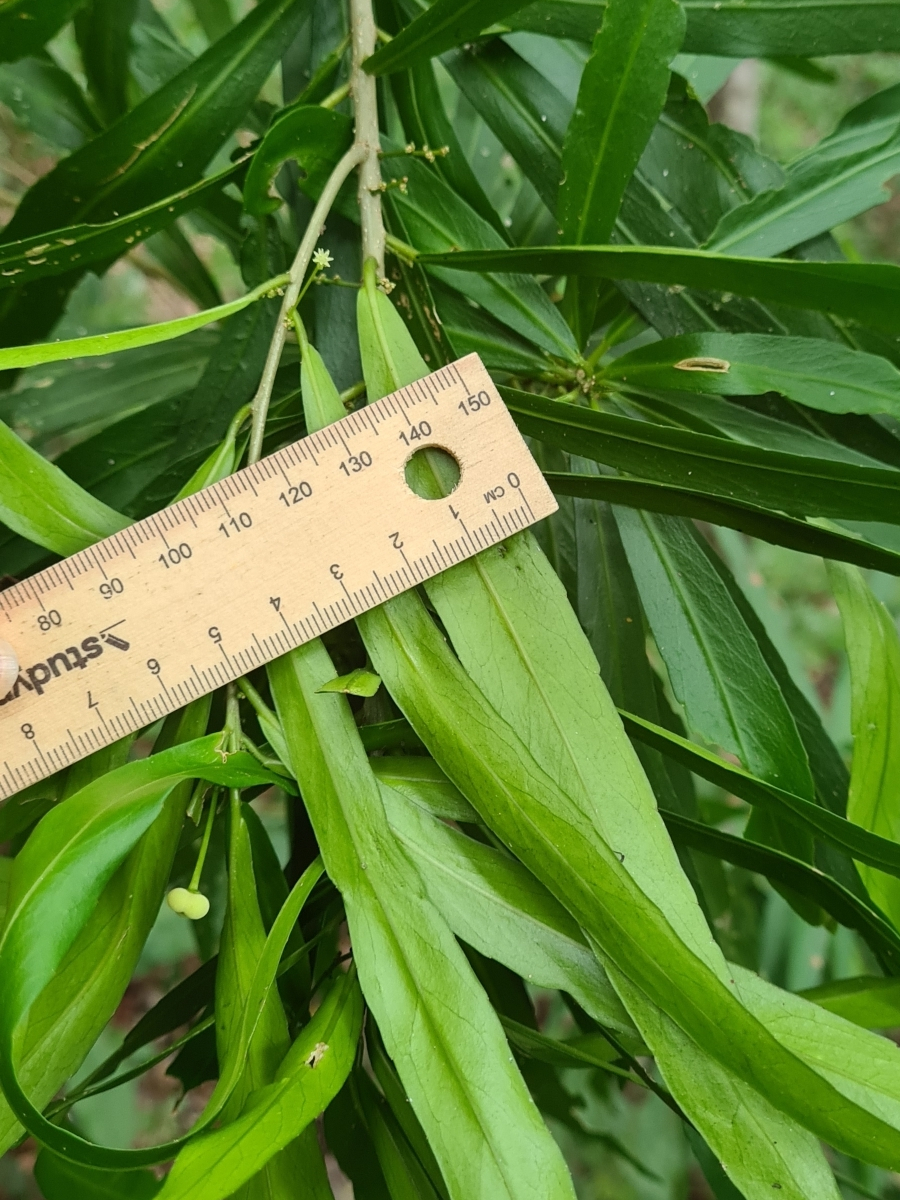
- Flower, fruit and foliage

Conservation status
- Least Concern (IUCN 3.1)

Scientific classification
- Kingdom: Plantae
- Clade: Tracheophytes
- Clade: Angiosperms
- Clade: Eudicots
- Clade: Rosids
- Order: Malpighiales
- Family: Euphorbiaceae
- Genus: Claoxylon
- Species: C. angustifolium

Binomial name
- Claoxylon angustifolium Müll.Arg.

Synonyms
- Mercurialis angustifolia (Müll.Arg.) Baill.

= Claoxylon angustifolium =

Species of flowering plant

Claoxylon angustifolium, commonly known as narrow leaf claoxylon, is a species of flowering plant in the family Euphorbiaceae found only in Queensland, Australia. It is a shrub which will usually grow to a height of about 4 m (13 ft), with long narrow leaves up to 22 cm (8.7 in) by 2 cm (0.79 in). The flowers are small, about 2 mm (0.08 in) diameter, and the fruit are capsules, green when ripe, and about 6 mm (0.24 in) long by 8 mm (0.31 in) wide. It was described in 1865 by Swiss botanist Johannes Müller Argoviensis. Its natural range is from the Mount Windsor National Park west of Mossman Gorge, south to Eungella National Park west of Mackay.

== Conservation ==
As of December 2024, this species has been assessed to be of least concern by the International Union for Conservation of Nature (IUCN) and by the Queensland Government under its Nature Conservation Act.

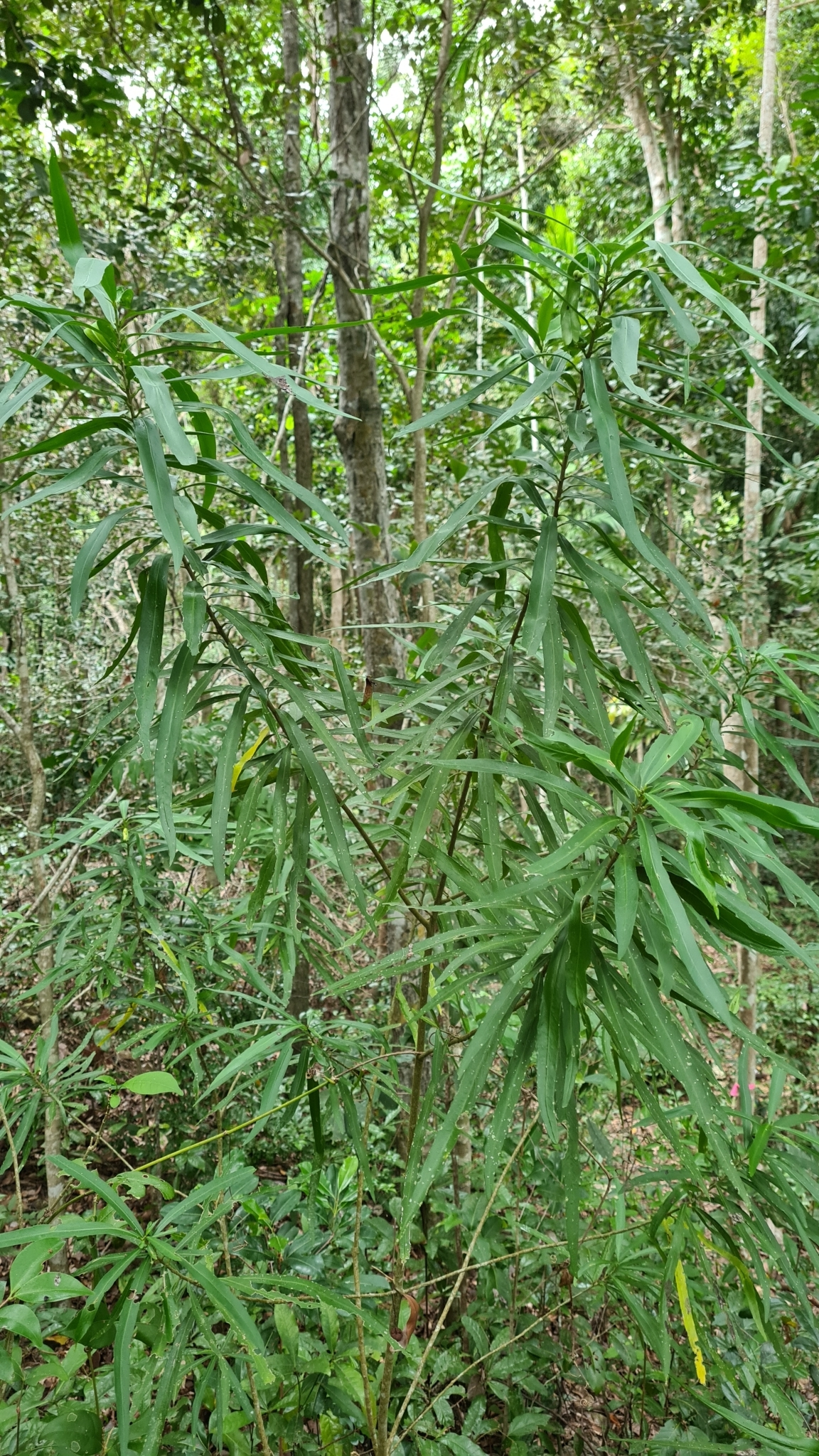
Habit

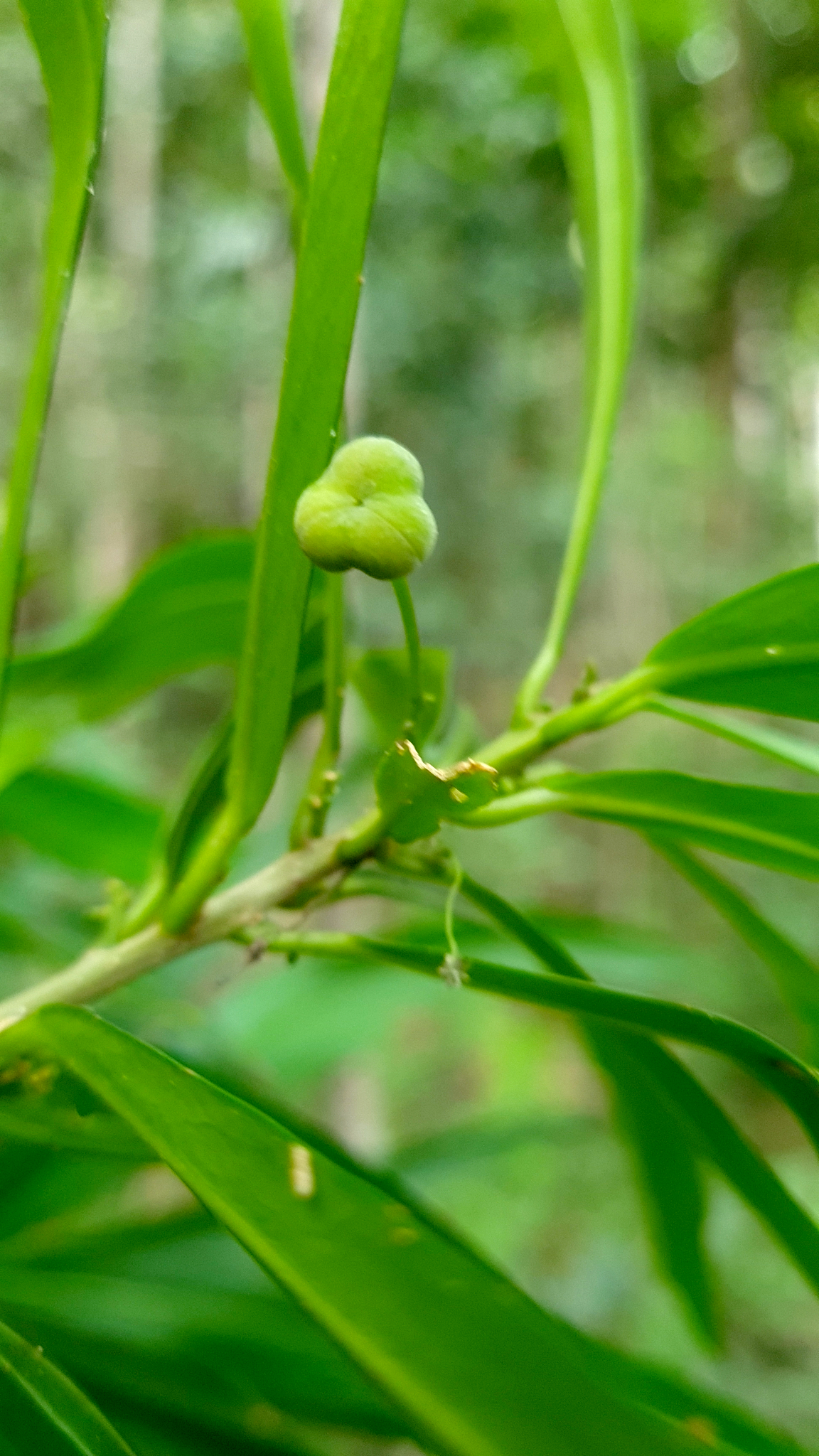
Fruit

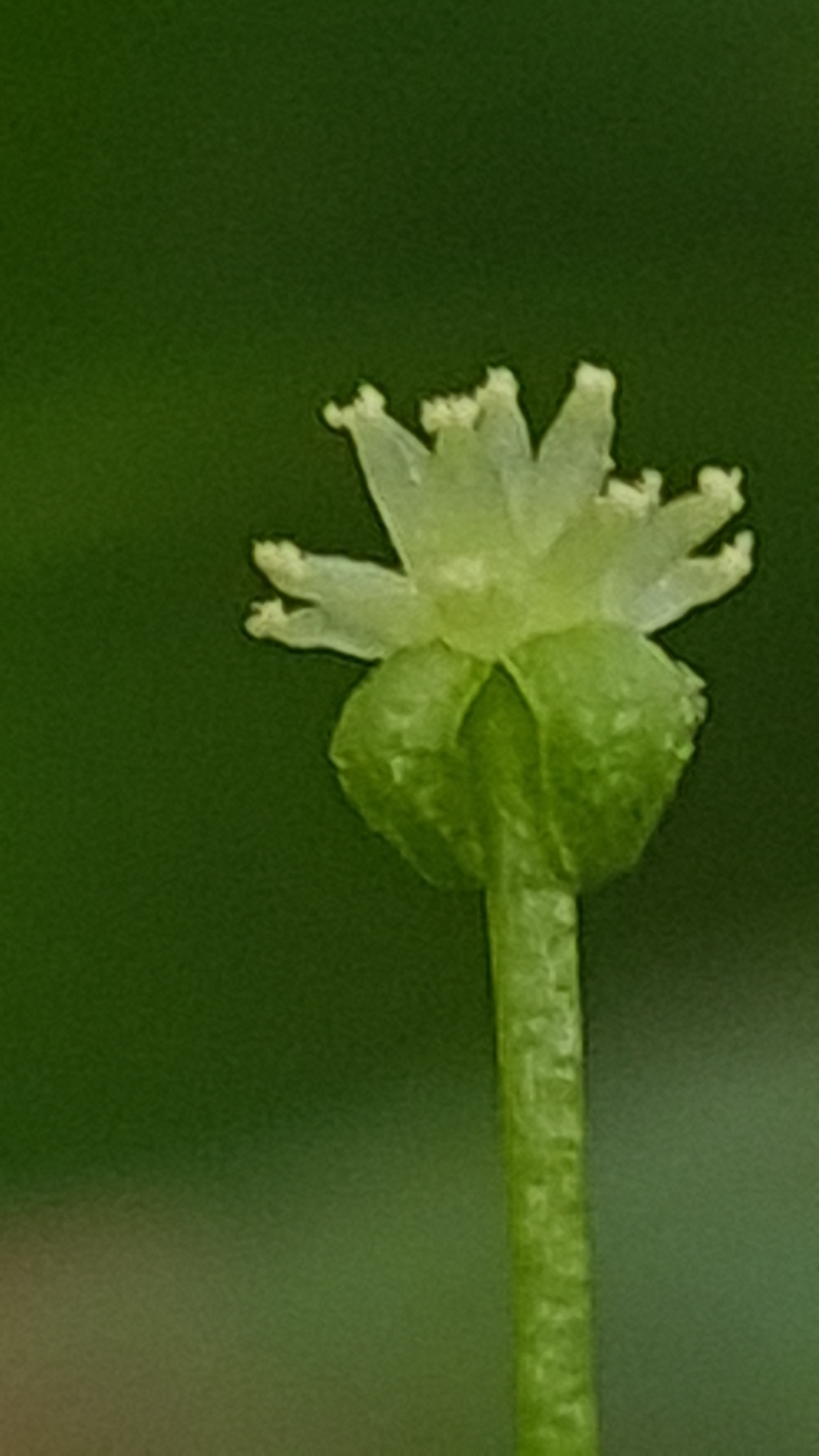
Flower
