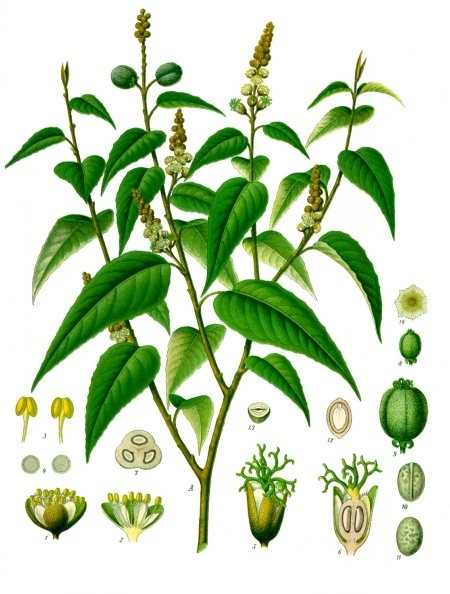

Conservation status
- Least Concern (IUCN 3.1)

Scientific classification
- Kingdom: Plantae
- Clade: Tracheophytes
- Clade: Angiosperms
- Clade: Eudicots
- Clade: Rosids
- Order: Malpighiales
- Family: Euphorbiaceae
- Genus: Croton
- Species: C. eluteria

Binomial name
- Croton eluteria (L.) W.Wright

= Croton eluteria =

Species of flowering plant

Croton eluteria, known as cascarilla, is a plant species of the genus Croton that is native to the Caribbean. It has been naturalized in other tropical regions of the Americas. It grows to be a small tree or tall shrub, rarely reaching 20 feet (6 m) in height. Its leaves are scanty, alternate, ovate-lanceolate, averaging 2 inches (5 cm) long, with close scaling below, giving a metallic silver-bronze appearance, and scattered white scales above. The flowers are small, with white petals, and very fragrant, appearing in March and April. The scented bark is fissured, pale yellowish brown, and may be covered in lichen.

== Chemical constituents ==
Cascarilla bark contains anything between 1% and 3% volatile oils, a unique series of diterpenoid compounds called cascarillins, lignins, tannin, and resins. There is also a long list of flavory terpene and diterpene compounds, including pinene, vanillin, D-limonene, and thujene.

== Uses ==
Croton eluteria is used to aid digestion. Cascarilla bark is also used to flavor the liqueurs Campari and Vermouth.
