= Deoptilia =

Scientific classification
- Kingdom: Animalia
- Phylum: Arthropoda
- Class: Insecta
- Order: Lepidoptera
- Family: Gracillariidae
- Subfamily: Acrocercopinae
- Genus: Deoptilia; Kumata & Kuroko, 1988

Species
- See text

Genus of moths

Deoptilia is a genus of moths in the family Gracillariidae.

== Etymology ==
Deoptilia is derived from the Greek deo (meaning bind) and ptilia (small wing).

== Species ==
- Deoptilia heptadeta (Meyrick, 1936)
- Deoptilia syrista (Meyrick, 1926)
