= Claoxylon longifolium =

Scientific classification
- Kingdom: Plantae
- Clade: Tracheophytes
- Clade: Angiosperms
- Clade: Eudicots
- Clade: Rosids
- Order: Malpighiales
- Family: Euphorbiaceae
- Genus: Claoxylon
- Species: C. longifolium

Binomial name
- Claoxylon longifolium (Blume) Endl. ex Hassk.

Synonyms
- Claoxylon elegans Airy Shaw

Species of flowering plant

Claoxylon longifolium is a species of flowering plants in the family Euphorbiaceae. It is found in Assam, South-East Asia, New Guinea and Caroline Islands.
