= Mallotophenone =

Names
- Preferred IUPAC name 1,1′-[Methylenebis(2,6-dihydroxy-4-methoxy-5-methyl-3,1-phenylene)]di(ethan-1-one)

Identifiers
CAS Number	98569-63-2
3D model (JSmol)	Interactive image
ChemSpider	155882
KEGG	C10708
PubChem CID	179090
UNII	YV44LJT547
CompTox Dashboard (EPA)	DTXSID70243720
- InChI: InChI=1S/C21H24O8/c1-8-16(24)14(10(3)22)18(26)12(20(8)28-5)7-13-19(27)15(11(4)23)17(25)9(2)21(13)29-6/h24-27H,7H2,1-6H3 Key: JXSPGOIAWPYMGS-UHFFFAOYSA-N; InChI=1/C21H24O8/c1-8-16(24)14(10(3)22)18(26)12(20(8)28-5)7-13-19(27)15(11(4)23)17(25)9(2)21(13)29-6/h24-27H,7H2,1-6H3 Key: JXSPGOIAWPYMGS-UHFFFAOYAZ
- SMILES: Cc1c(O)c(C(=O)C)c(O)c(c1OC)Cc(c(OC)c2C)c(O)c(C(C)=O)c2O

Properties
Chemical formula	C_{21}H_{24}O_{8}
Molar mass	404.415 g·mol^{−1}
- Except where otherwise noted, data are given for materials in their standard state (at 25 °C [77 °F], 100 kPa). Infobox references

Mallotophenone is a dimeric phloroglucinol found in Mallotus oppositifolius or in Mallotus japonicus.

The bioassay-guided fractionation of an ethanol extract of the leaves and inflorescence of M. oppositifolius collected in Madagascar led to the isolation of the two new bioactive dimeric phloroglucinols mallotophenone, together with mallotojaponins B and C. Diphenylmethanes are compounds that contain diphenylmethane moiety, which is a methane wherein two hydrogen atoms are replaced by two phenyl groups. Mallotophenone is strong as it has a very solid basic compound (based on its pKa).These compounds show antiproliferative and antiplasmodial activities. It’s chemical formula is C21H24O8.
