= Deoptilia syrista =

Scientific classification
- Kingdom: Animalia
- Phylum: Arthropoda
- Class: Insecta
- Order: Lepidoptera
- Family: Gracillariidae
- Genus: Deoptilia
- Species: D. syrista

Binomial name
- Deoptilia syrista (Meyrick, 1926)

Synonyms
- Acrocercops syrista Meyrick, 1926

Species of moth

Deoptilia syrista is a moth of the family Gracillariidae. It is known from the states of Karnataka and Maharashtra in India and from Malaysia and Taiwan.

The larvae feed on Mallotus philippinensis. They mine the leaves of their host plant. The mine starts as an irregular gallery along the veins under the upper cuticle of the leaf. Later mining occurs under a web spun over the upper surface of the veins. Eating takes place on either side of the vein, but the red dotted glands remain untouched.
