= Erythrococca molleri =

Conservation status
- Near Threatened (IUCN 2.3)

Scientific classification
- Kingdom: Plantae
- Clade: Tracheophytes
- Clade: Angiosperms
- Clade: Eudicots
- Clade: Rosids
- Order: Malpighiales
- Family: Euphorbiaceae
- Genus: Erythrococca
- Species: E. molleri

Binomial name
- Erythrococca molleri (Pax) Prain

Synonyms
- Athroandra molleri (Pax) Pax & K.Hoffm.; Claoxylon molleri Pax; Claoxylon purpurascens Beille

Species of flowering plant

Erythrococca molleri is a species of flowering plant in the family Euphorbiaceae. It is a shrub or tree endemic to São Tomé Island.
