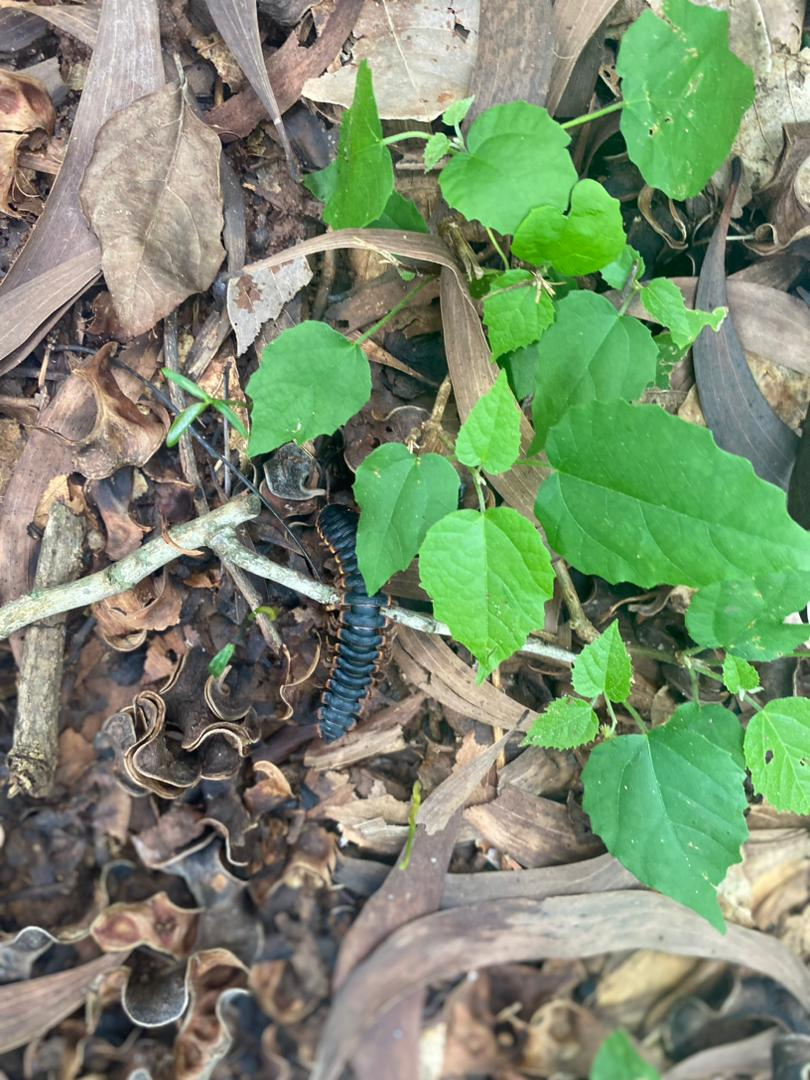
- At University of Abomey-Calavi, Benin

Conservation status
- Least Concern (IUCN 3.1)

Scientific classification
- Kingdom: Plantae
- Clade: Tracheophytes
- Clade: Angiosperms
- Clade: Eudicots
- Clade: Rosids
- Order: Malpighiales
- Family: Euphorbiaceae
- Genus: Mallotus
- Species: M. oppositifolius

Binomial name
- Mallotus oppositifolius (Geiseler) Müll.Arg.

Varieties
- M. oppositifolius var. genuinus M. oppositifolius var. glabratus M. oppositifolius var. integrifolius M. oppositifolius var. lindicus M. oppositifolius var. pubescens

= Mallotus oppositifolius =

Species of flowering plant

Mallotus oppositifolius is a plant species in the genus Mallotus found in Africa and Madagascar.

The variety Mallotus oppositifolius var. lindicus is classified in the IUCN red list of vulnerable species of plants.

The aqueous and ethanol extracts of the plant show antifungal properties, and anti parasitic activity against blastocystis hominis. The bioassay-guided fractionation of an ethanol extract of the leaves and inflorescence of M. oppositifolius collected in Madagascar led to the isolation of the two new bioactive dimeric phloroglucinols mallotojaponins B and C, together with mallotophenone. These compounds show antiproliferative and antiplasmodial (antimalarial) activities. Two components of M. oppositifolius leaf extract, MTX and isovaleric acid, synergistically activate heteromeric KCNQ2/3 (potassium) channels, indicating the molecular mechanism behind the anticonvulsant properties of this widely used African traditional medicine
