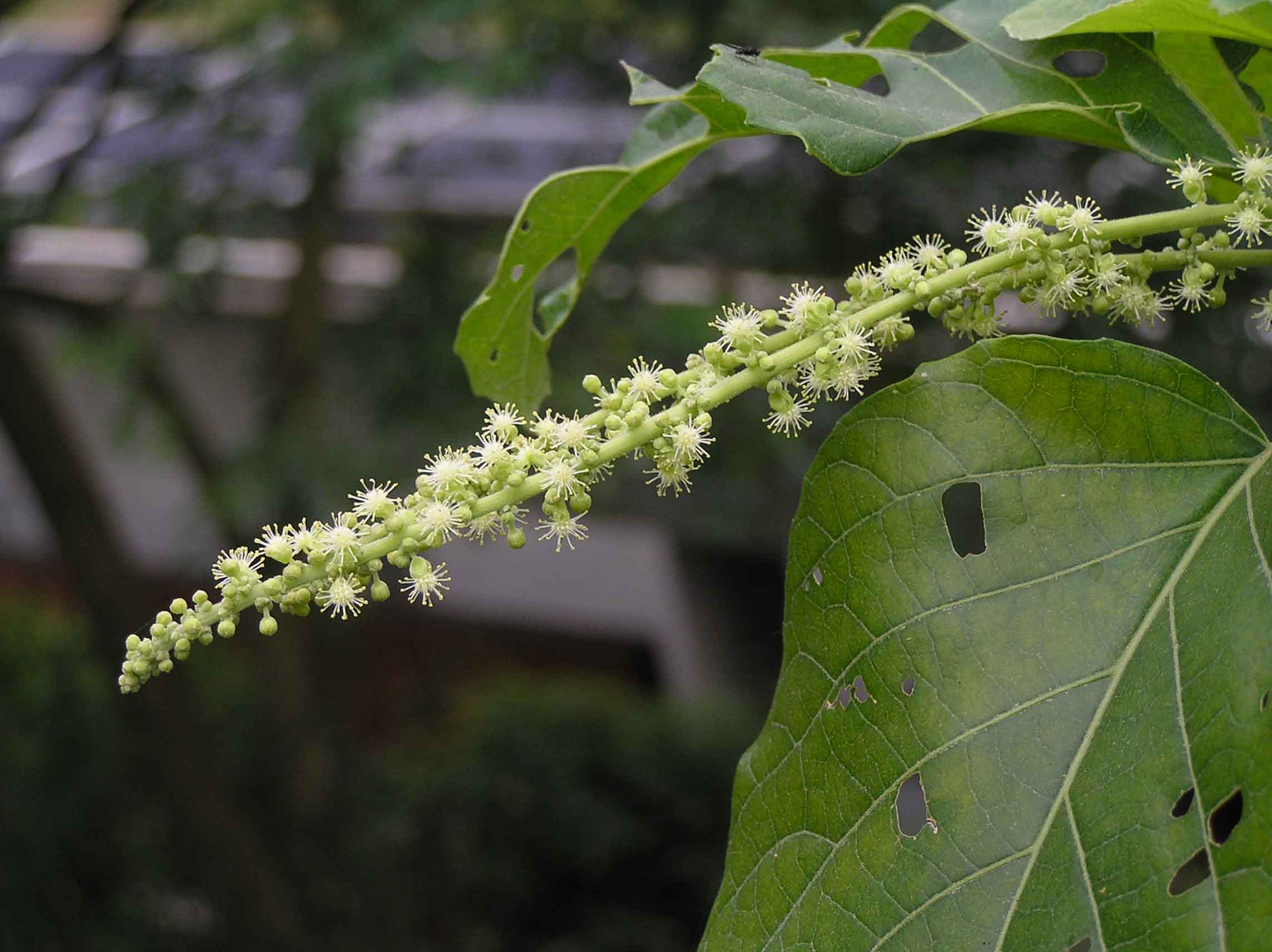

Scientific classification
- Kingdom: Plantae
- Clade: Tracheophytes
- Clade: Angiosperms
- Clade: Eudicots
- Clade: Rosids
- Order: Malpighiales
- Family: Euphorbiaceae
- Genus: Claoxylon
- Species: C. indicum

Binomial name
- Claoxylon indicum (Reinw. ex Blume) Hassk. (1844)

Synonyms
- Erythrochilus indicus Reinw. ex Blume; Claoxylon caerulescens Ridl.

= Claoxylon indicum =

Species of flowering plant

Claoxylon indicum is a plant in the spurge family Euphorbiaceae native to south and southeast Asia. The Latin word indicum means "Indian", referring to the locality of collection of the type specimen, which was probably Java, part of the Dutch East Indies at that time.

== Description ==
Claoxylon indicum is a pyramid-shaped shrub or small tree growing to 2–10 m in height. Its branches are grey and hairy, with large leaf scars. The leaves are oval and 80–300 mm long. The slender male inflorescence is 30–150 mm long, carrying many flowers; the female inflorescence 15–80 mm long. The lobed fruit is 7–10 mm in diameter, and the seeds round, black and wrinkled.

== Distribution and habitat ==
The plant is widely distributed through southern and south-eastern Asia from India and southern China through Indochina and Malesia to Sulawesi. It also occurs on Christmas Island, an Australian territory in the north-eastern Indian Ocean south of Java. It is common along roadsides, railways, forest edges and in forest clearings.
