= Mallotojaponin C =

Names
- Preferred IUPAC name 1,1′-{{#parsoidfragment:0}}{Methylenebis[2,6-dihydroxy-4-methoxy-5-(3-methylbut-2-en-1-yl)-3,1-phenylene]}di(ethan-1-one)

Identifiers
3D model (JSmol)	Interactive image
ChEMBL	ChEMBL2337125
ChemSpider	29414242
PubChem CID	71658103
CompTox Dashboard (EPA)	DTXSID701045321
- InChI: InChI=1S/C29H36O8/c1-14(2)9-11-18-24(32)22(16(5)30)26(34)20(28(18)36-7)13-21-27(35)23(17(6)31)25(33)19(29(21)37-8)12-10-15(3)4/h9-10,32-35H,11-13H2,1-8H3 Key: SQDDGCHCPZMCOU-UHFFFAOYSA-N; InChI=1/C29H36O8/c1-14(2)9-11-18-24(32)22(16(5)30)26(34)20(28(18)36-7)13-21-27(35)23(17(6)31)25(33)19(29(21)37-8)12-10-15(3)4/h9-10,32-35H,11-13H2,1-8H3 Key: SQDDGCHCPZMCOU-UHFFFAOYAI
- SMILES: CC(=O)c1c(O)c(c(OC)c(c1O)C\C=C(\C)/C)Cc2c(OC)c(C\C=C(/C)\C)c(O)c(C(=O)C)c2O

Properties
Chemical formula	C_{29}H_{36}O_{8}
Molar mass	512.599 g·mol^{−1}
- Except where otherwise noted, data are given for materials in their standard state (at 25 °C [77 °F], 100 kPa). Infobox references

Mallotojaponin C is a dimeric phloroglucinol found in Mallotus oppositifolius.

The bioassay-guided fractionation of an ethanol extract of the leaves and inflorescence of M. oppositifolius collected in Madagascar led to the isolation of the two new bioactive dimeric phloroglucinols mallotojaponins B and C, together with mallotophenone. These compounds show antiproliferative and antiplasmodial activities.
