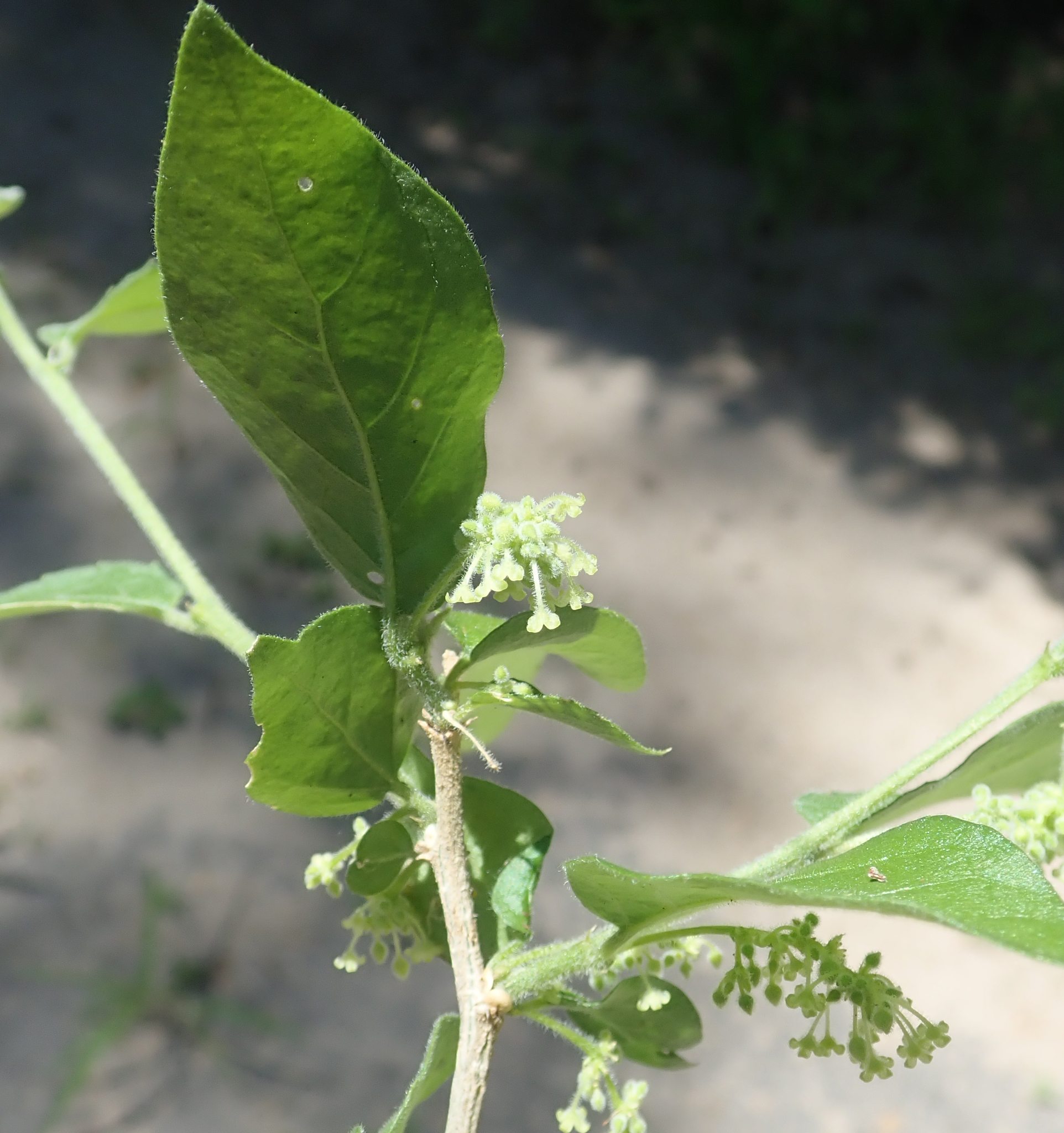
- Erythrococca menyharthii in Botswana

Scientific classification
- Kingdom: Plantae
- Clade: Tracheophytes
- Clade: Angiosperms
- Clade: Eudicots
- Clade: Rosids
- Order: Malpighiales
- Family: Euphorbiaceae
- Subfamily: Acalyphoideae
- Tribe: Acalypheae
- Subtribe: Claoxylinae
- Genus: Erythrococca; Benth.

Type species
- Erythrococca aculeata (syn of E. anomala) Benth.

Synonyms
- Athroandra (Hook.f.) Pax & K.Hoffm.; Autrandra Pierre ex Prain; Chloropatane Engl.; Deflersia Schweinf. ex Penz.; Poggeophyton Pax

= Erythrococca =

Genus of flowering plants

Erythrococca is a plant genus of the family Euphorbiaceae, first described in 1849. It is native to Africa and the Arabian Peninsula.

Species

1. Erythrococca abyssinica - Ethiopia, Eritrea, Yemen, Saudi Arabia
2. Erythrococca africana - W + C Africa
3. Erythrococca angolensis - Angola, Zambia
4. Erythrococca anomala - W + C Africa
5. Erythrococca atrovirens - W + C Africa
6. Erythrococca berberidea - Tanzania, Mozambique, KwaZulu-Natal
7. Erythrococca bongensis - E + C Africa
8. Erythrococca chevalieri - Guinea, Benin, Congo-Brazzaville
9. Erythrococca columnaris - Príncipe, Gabon, Central African Republic
10. Erythrococca dewevrei - Zaïre, Cameroon, Equatorial Guinea
11. Erythrococca fischeri - Tanzania, Kenya, Uganda, Burundi, Rwanda
12. Erythrococca hispida - Cameroon
13. Erythrococca integrifolia - Somalia
14. Erythrococca kirkii - Tanzania, Kenya, Mozambique
15. Erythrococca laurentii - Zaïre
16. Erythrococca macrophylla - Zaïre
17. Erythrococca mannii - Pico Basilé
18. Erythrococca membranacea - Nigeria, Cameroon, Gabon
19. Erythrococca menyharthii - E + S Africa from Kenya to Namibia
20. Erythrococca molleri - São Tomé
21. Erythrococca natalensis - KwaZulu-Natal
22. Erythrococca neglecta - Angola
23. Erythrococca pallidifolia - Bioko
24. Erythrococca parvifolia - Ethiopia
25. Erythrococca patula - Cameroon
26. Erythrococca pauciflora - Angola
27. Erythrococca pentagyna - Kenya
28. Erythrococca poggei - Congo, Zaïre
29. Erythrococca poggeophyton - Zaïre
30. Erythrococca polyandra - Tanzania, Mozambique, Zimbabwe, Equatorial Guinea
31. Erythrococca pubescens - Kenya
32. Erythrococca rivularis - Cameroon, Equatorial Guinea
33. Erythrococca sanjensis - Tanzania
34. Erythrococca subspicata - Congo, Zaïre, Central African Republic
35. Erythrococca trichogyne - Ethiopia to Botswana
36. Erythrococca tristis - Angola
37. Erythrococca ulugurensis - Tanzania, Malawi
38. Erythrococca uniflora - Ethiopia
39. Erythrococca usambarica - Tanzania, Kenya
40. Erythrococca welwitschiana - C Africa
41. Erythrococca zambesiaca - Malawi, Mozambique
