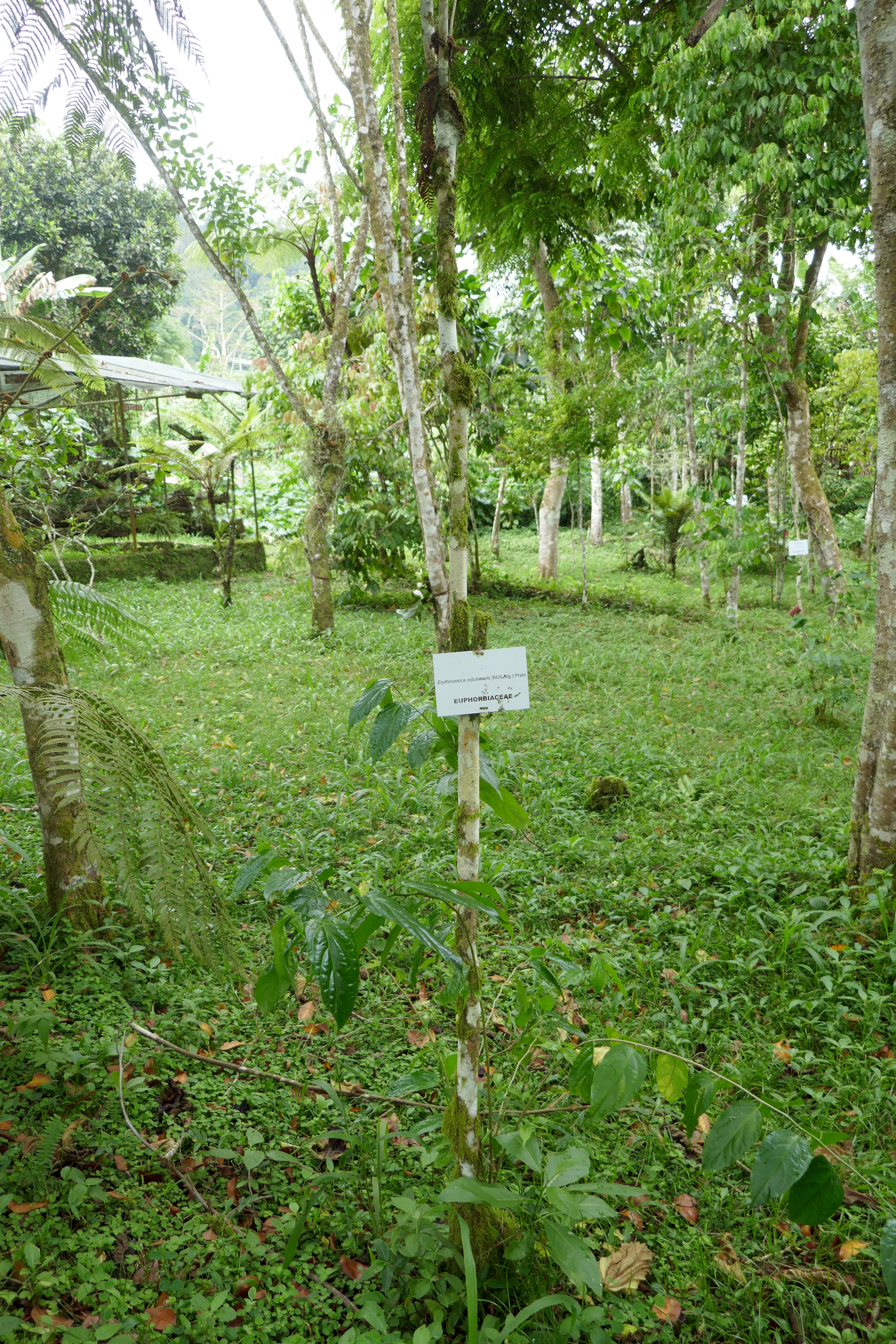

Conservation status
- Vulnerable (IUCN 2.3)

Scientific classification
- Kingdom: Plantae
- Clade: Tracheophytes
- Clade: Angiosperms
- Clade: Eudicots
- Clade: Rosids
- Order: Malpighiales
- Family: Euphorbiaceae
- Genus: Erythrococca
- Species: E. columnaris

Binomial name
- Erythrococca columnaris (Muell. Arg.) Prain

= Erythrococca columnaris =

Species of flowering plant

Erythrococca columnaris is a species of plant in the family Euphorbiaceae. It is endemic to Príncipe.
