= Mallotojaponin B =

Names
- Preferred IUPAC name 1-(3-{[3-Acetyl-2,4-dihydroxy-6-methoxy-5-(3-methylbut-2-en-1-yl)phenyl]methyl}-2,6-dihydroxy-4-methoxy-5-methylphenyl)ethan-1-one

Identifiers
CAS Number	1417701-55-3
3D model (JSmol)	Interactive image
ChEMBL	ChEMBL2337124
ChemSpider	28945549
PubChem CID	71657974
CompTox Dashboard (EPA)	DTXSID101336346
- InChI: InChI=1S/C25H30O8/c1-11(2)8-9-15-21(29)19(14(5)27)23(31)17(25(15)33-7)10-16-22(30)18(13(4)26)20(28)12(3)24(16)32-6/h8,28-31H,9-10H2,1-7H3 Key: WVPDRBVWCPPZIR-UHFFFAOYSA-N
- SMILES: Cc1c(c(c(c(c1OC)Cc2c(c(c(c(c2OC)CC=C(C)C)O)C(=O)C)O)O)C(=O)C)O

Properties
Chemical formula	C_{25}H_{30}O_{8}
Molar mass	458.507 g·mol^{−1}
- Except where otherwise noted, data are given for materials in their standard state (at 25 °C [77 °F], 100 kPa). Infobox references

Mallotojaponin B is a dimeric phloroglucinol found in Mallotus oppositifolius.

The bioassay-guided fractionation of an ethanol extract of the leaves and inflorescence of M. oppositifolius collected in Madagascar led to the isolation of the two new bioactive dimeric phloroglucinols mallotojaponins B and C, together with mallotophenone. These compounds show antiproliferative and antiplasmodial activities.
