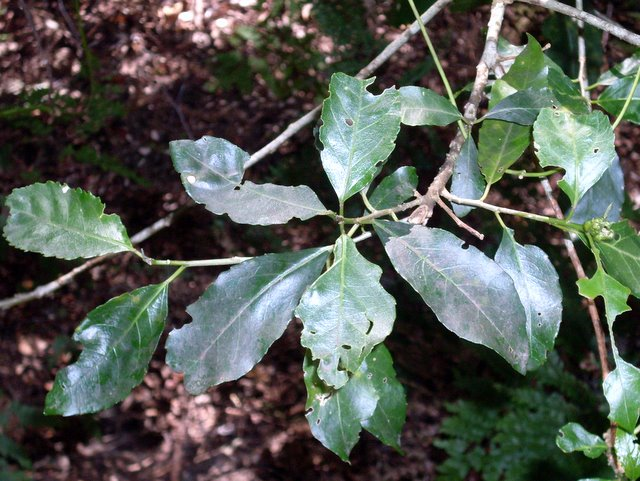
- At Macquarie Pass National Park, NSW

Scientific classification
- Kingdom: Plantae
- Clade: Tracheophytes
- Clade: Angiosperms
- Clade: Eudicots
- Clade: Rosids
- Order: Malpighiales
- Family: Euphorbiaceae
- Genus: Claoxylon
- Species: C. australe

Binomial name
- Claoxylon australe Baill.

= Claoxylon australe =

Species of tree

Claoxylon australe, known as brittlewood is a common rainforest shrub or understorey tree. Its habitat includes all types of eastern Australian rainforests. The natural range of distribution is from Eden (37° S) in southeastern New South Wales to Bowen (20° S) in tropical Queensland.

== Description ==
A shrub or small tree growing to 9 metres in height and a trunk diameter of 30 cm. The trunk is cylindrical or somewhat flanged at the butt in larger plants. The bark is fawnish brown or grey, fairly smooth with some lines of vertical bumps and other irregularities. Branchlets are often hairy, green turning to fawn with lenticels.

Leaves are alternate, simple and toothed in an irregular manner. They are oblong or elliptical in shape, 5 to 12 cm long with a blunt leaf tip. Leaf stalks are 1 to 4 cm long. There are usually two small glands at the apex. The midrib is paler than the leaf itself, and venation is more evident under the leaf.

Greenish flowers form on racemes in the months of October and November. Male and female flowers occur on separate plants (dioecious). The fruit matures in January to March, being a purple-black capsule, which is globular in shape, 6 mm in diameter. Within each of the three lobes of the capsule is a single red warty seed. Its fruit is eaten by the brown cuckoo-dove and Australian king parrot.
