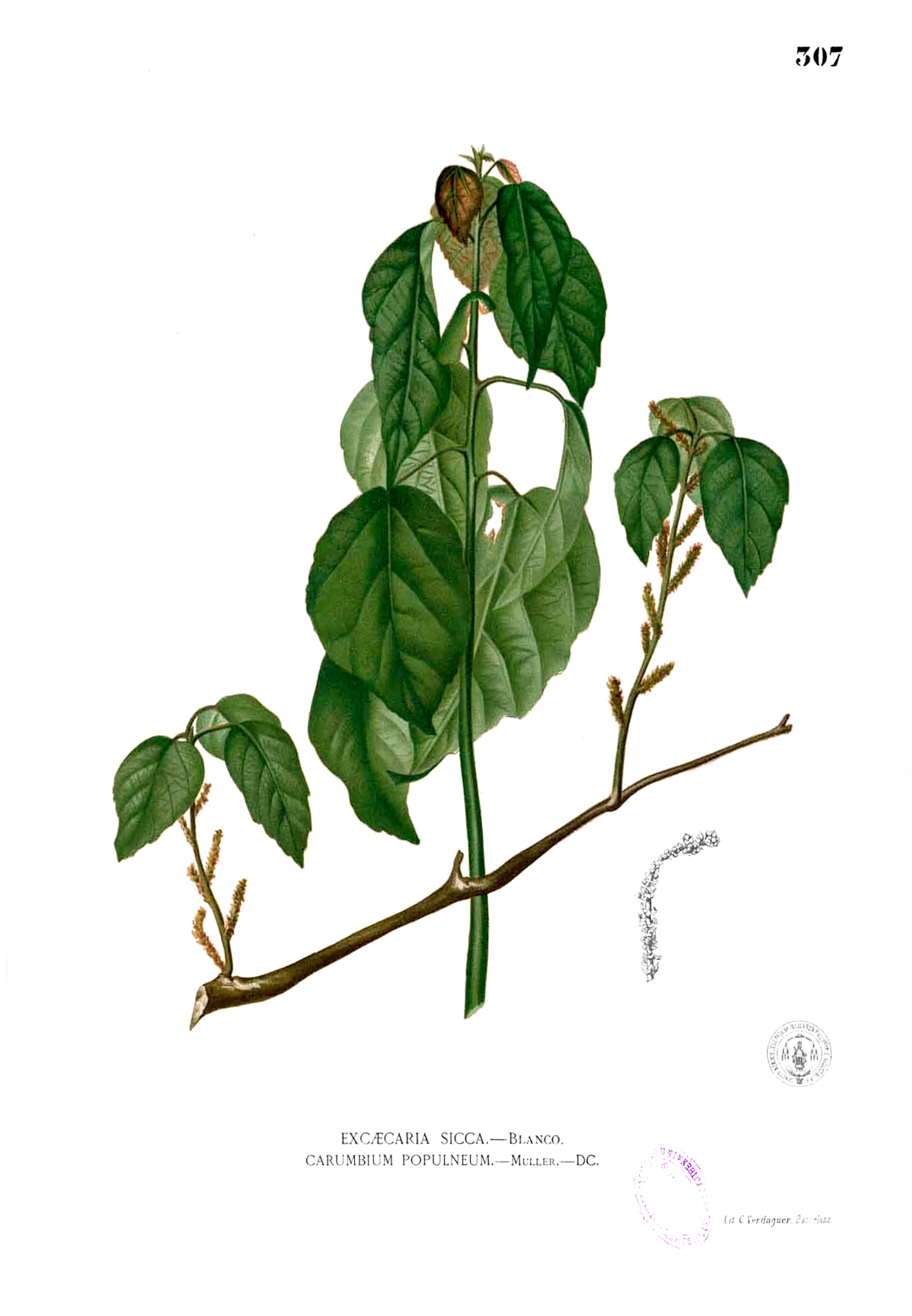
- Alchornea sicca

Scientific classification
- Kingdom: Plantae
- Clade: Tracheophytes
- Clade: Angiosperms
- Clade: Eudicots
- Clade: Rosids
- Order: Malpighiales
- Family: Euphorbiaceae
- Subfamily: Acalyphoideae
- Tribe: Alchorneae
- Subtribe: Alchorneinae
- Genus: Alchornea; Sw.

Synonyms
- Bleekeria Miq.; Caelebogyne (Coelebogyne) J.Sm.; Cladodes Lour.; Hermesia Humb. & Bonpl.; Lepidoturus Baill.; Schousboea Schumach. & Thonn. (non Willd.: preoccupied); Stipellaria Benth.; Caturus Lour.

= Alchornea =

Genus of flowering plants

Alchornea is a plant genus of the family Euphorbiaceae first described as a genus in 1788. It is widespread in tropical and subtropical regions of Africa, South Asia, Australia, Latin America, and various oceanic islands. Molecular phylogenetic analyses suggest that Bocquillonia from New Caledonia is nested in Alchornea.

Species

1. Alchornea acutifolia - Venezuela, Colombia, Peru
2. Alchornea alnifolia - Madagascar, Mayotte
3. Alchornea anamariae - Peru, Bolivia
4. Alchornea androgyna - N Vietnam
5. Alchornea annamica - Vietnam
6. Alchornea aquifolia - Queensland, New South Wales
7. Alchornea bogotensis - Venezuela, Colombia, Ecuador
8. Alchornea brittonii - Peru, Bolivia
9. Alchornea castaneifolia - South America
10. Alchornea chiapasana - Veracruz, Chiapas
11. Alchornea coelophylla - Colombia, Ecuador
12. Alchornea cordifolia - tropical Africa
13. Alchornea costaricensis - Central America, Colombia, Ecuador
14. Alchornea davidii - S China
15. Alchornea discolor - South America
16. Alchornea floribunda - tropical Africa
17. Alchornea fluviatilis - South America
18. Alchornea glabra - Anhui
19. Alchornea glandulosa - South + Central America
20. Alchornea grandiflora - South + Central America
21. Alchornea grandis - Venezuela, Colombia, Ecuador, Panama
22. Alchornea guatemalensis - Baja Verapaz
23. Alchornea hilariana - Peru, Bolivia, Brazil
24. Alchornea hirtella - Africa
25. Alchornea humbertii - Madagascar
26. Alchornea hunanensis - Hunan
27. Alchornea integrifolia - Guatemala, Honduras, Colombia
28. Alchornea latifolia - Mexico, West Indies, C + S America
29. Alchornea laxiflora - Africa
30. Alchornea liukiuensis - Taiwan, Nansei-shoto
31. Alchornea lojaensis - Ecuador
32. Alchornea megalophylla - Colombia, Panama
33. Alchornea mildbraedii - Cameroon
34. Alchornea mollis - E Himalayas
35. Alchornea occidentalis - C Africa
36. Alchornea parviflora - Thailand, Philippines, Borneo, Sumatra, Malaysia
37. Alchornea pearcei - Peru, Bolivia, Colombia, Ecuador
38. Alchornea perrieri - Madagascar
39. Alchornea rhodophylla - Penang
40. Alchornea rugosa - SE Asia, S China, Assam, Queensland, Papuasia
41. Alchornea scandens - Vietnam
42. Alchornea sicca - Luzon, Indochina
43. Alchornea sidifolia - S Brazil, Misiones
44. Alchornea tachirensis - Venezuela, Colombia
45. Alchornea tiliifolia - SE Asia, E Himalayas
46. Alchornea trewioides - S China, N Vietnam
47. Alchornea triplinervia - South + Central America, Trinidad
48. Alchornea ulmifolia - Ryukyu Islands
49. Alchornea vaniotii - Yunnan
50. Alchornea websteri - Ecuador
51. Alchornea yambuyaensis - SC Africa

formerly included

moved to other genera (Aparisthmium Cleidion Cnesmone Discocleidion Discoglypremna Necepsia Neoscortechinia Orfilea Sampantaea Trigonostemon Wetria )

1. A. amentiflora - Sampantaea amentiflora
2. A. arborea - Neoscortechinia nicobarica
3. A. blumeana - Wetria insignis
4. A. caloneura - Discoglypremna caloneura
5. A. castaneifolia - Necepsia castaneifolia
6. A. cordata (A.Juss.) Müll.Arg. 1866 not Benth. 1849 - Aparisthmium cordatum
7. A. coriacea (Baill.) Müll.Arg. 1865 not Ule 1909 - Orfilea coriacea
8. A. cuneata - Trigonostemon heteranthus
9. A. cuneifolia - Trigonostemon heteranthus
10. A. latifolia Klotzsch not Sw. 1788 - Aparisthmium cordatum
11. A. macrophylla - Aparisthmium cordatum
12. A. madagascariensis - Necepsia castaneifolia
13. A. mairei - Cnesmone mairei
14. A. mappa - Macaranga mappa
15. A. martiana - Conceveiba martiana
16. A. multispicata - Orfilea multispicata
17. A. oblongifolia - Cleidion castaneifolium
18. A. orinocensis - Aparisthmium cordatum
19. A. rufescens - Discocleidion rufescens
