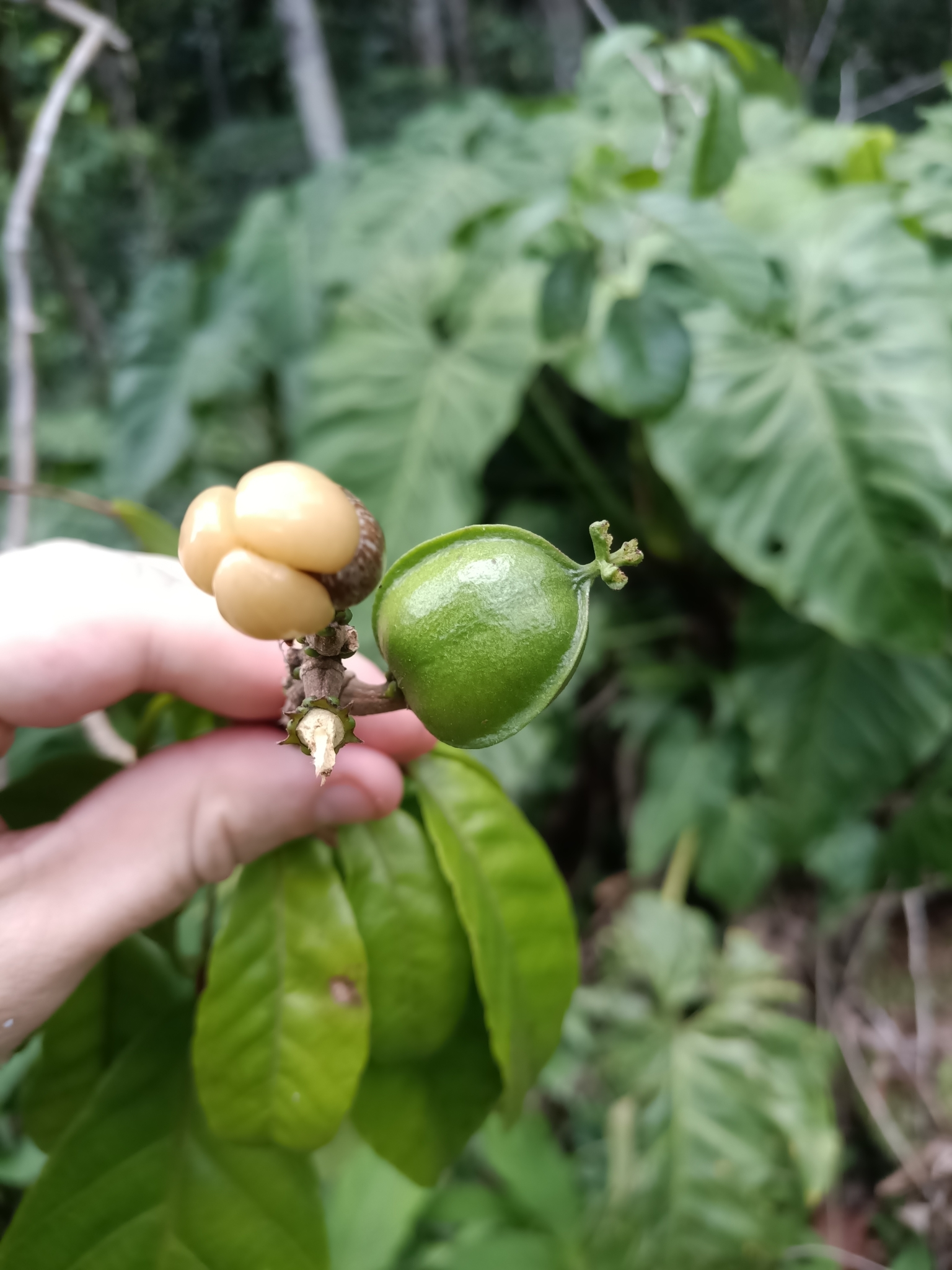
- Conceveiba guianensis in French Guiana

Scientific classification
- Kingdom: Plantae
- Clade: Tracheophytes
- Clade: Angiosperms
- Clade: Eudicots
- Clade: Rosids
- Order: Malpighiales
- Family: Euphorbiaceae
- Subfamily: Acalyphoideae
- Tribe: Alchorneae
- Subtribe: Conceveibinae
- Genus: Conceveiba; Aubl.

Synonyms
- Gavarretia Baill.; Conceveibastrum (Müll.Arg.) Pax & K.Hoffm.; Veconcibea (Müll.Arg.) Pax & K.Hoffm.; Polyandra Leal

= Conceveiba =

Genus of flowering plants

Conceveiba is a plant genus of the family Euphorbiaceae, first described as a genus in 1775. It is native to South America and Central America.

Species

1. Conceveiba guianensis Aubl. - Brazil, Peru, Bolivia, Ecuador, Colombia, Venezuela, 3 Guianas
2. Conceveiba hostmanii Benth. - Guyana, Suriname, Amazonas State in Brazil
3. Conceveiba krukoffii Steyerm. - Venezuela, French Guiana, NW Brazil
4. Conceveiba latifolia Benth. - Colombia, Venezuela, Peru, Amazonas State in Brazil
5. Conceveiba martiana Baill. - Venezuela, French Guiana, NW Brazil, Colombia, Ecuador, Peru, Bolivia
6. Conceveiba maynasensis Secco - Loreto in Peru
7. Conceveiba parvifolia McPherson - Panama, NW Colombia
8. Conceveiba pleiostemona Donn.Sm. - Costa Rica, Nicaragua, Colombia, Venezuela
9. Conceveiba praealta (Croizat) Punt ex J.Murillo - NW Brazil
10. Conceveiba ptariana (Steyerm.) Jabl. - S Venezuela
11. Conceveiba rhytidocarpa Müll.Arg. - Colombia, Ecuador, Peru
12. Conceveiba santanderensis J.Murillo - NW Colombia
13. Conceveiba terminalis (Baill.) Müll.Arg. - Venezuela, Guyana, Suriname, NW Brazil, Colombia, Peru
14. Conceveiba tristigmata J.Murillo - Colombia, Venezuela, NW Brazil

formerly included

moved to other genera (Alchornea Aparisthmium Aubletiana Cladogynos Neoboutonia )

1. C. africana Müll.Arg. 1865 - Neoboutonia mannii
2. C. africana D.W.Thomas 1990 - Aubletiana macrostachys
3. C. cordata - Aparisthmium cordatum
4. C. javanensis - Alchornea rugosa
5. C. leptostachys - Aubletiana leptostachys
6. C. macropylla - Aparisthmium cordatum
7. C. macrostachys - Aubletiana macrostachys
8. C. poeppigiana - Aparisthmium cordatum
9. C. pubescens - Alchornea brittonii
10. C. tomentosa - Cladogynos orientalis
