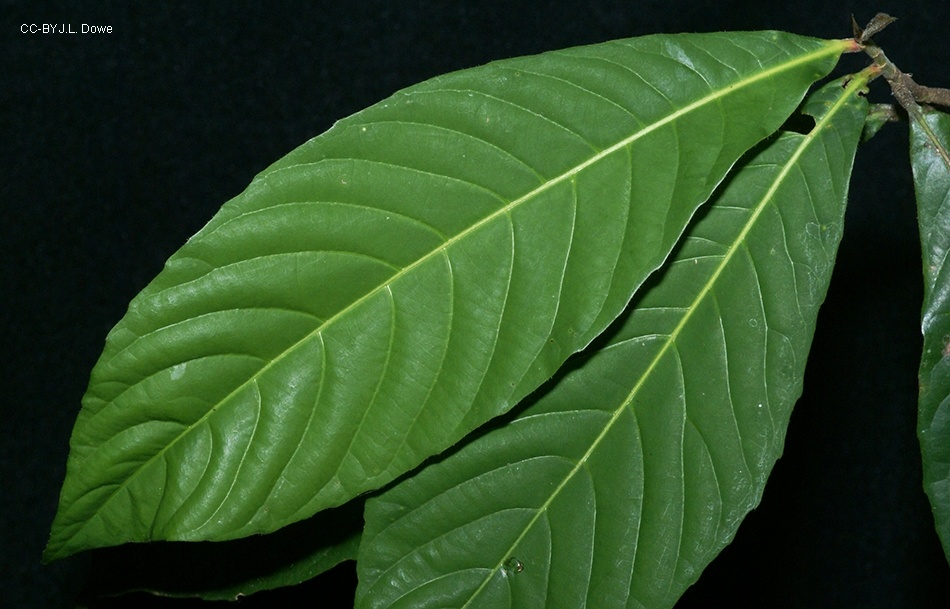
- Wetria australiensis

Scientific classification
- Kingdom: Plantae
- Clade: Tracheophytes
- Clade: Angiosperms
- Clade: Eudicots
- Clade: Rosids
- Order: Malpighiales
- Family: Euphorbiaceae
- Subfamily: Acalyphoideae
- Tribe: Acalypheae
- Subtribe: Cleidiinae
- Genus: Wetria; Baill.

Type species
- Wetria trewioides (syn of Wetria insignis) Baill.

Synonyms
- Pseudotrewia Miq.

= Wetria =

Genus of flowering plants

Wetria is a plant genus of the family Euphorbiaceae, first described as a genus in 1858. It is native to Australia, New Guinea and Southeast Asia.

Species

1. Wetria australiensis P.I.Forst. - Papua New Guinea, Queensland
2. Wetria insignis (Steud.) Airy Shaw - Thailand, Myanmar, Peninsular Malaysia, Borneo, Sumatra, Java, Lesser Sunda Islands, Philippines

Formerly included

moved to other genera (Discocleidion, Trigonostemon)

1. Wetria cuneifolia - Trigonostemon heteranthus
2. Wetria rufescens - Discocleidion rufescens
