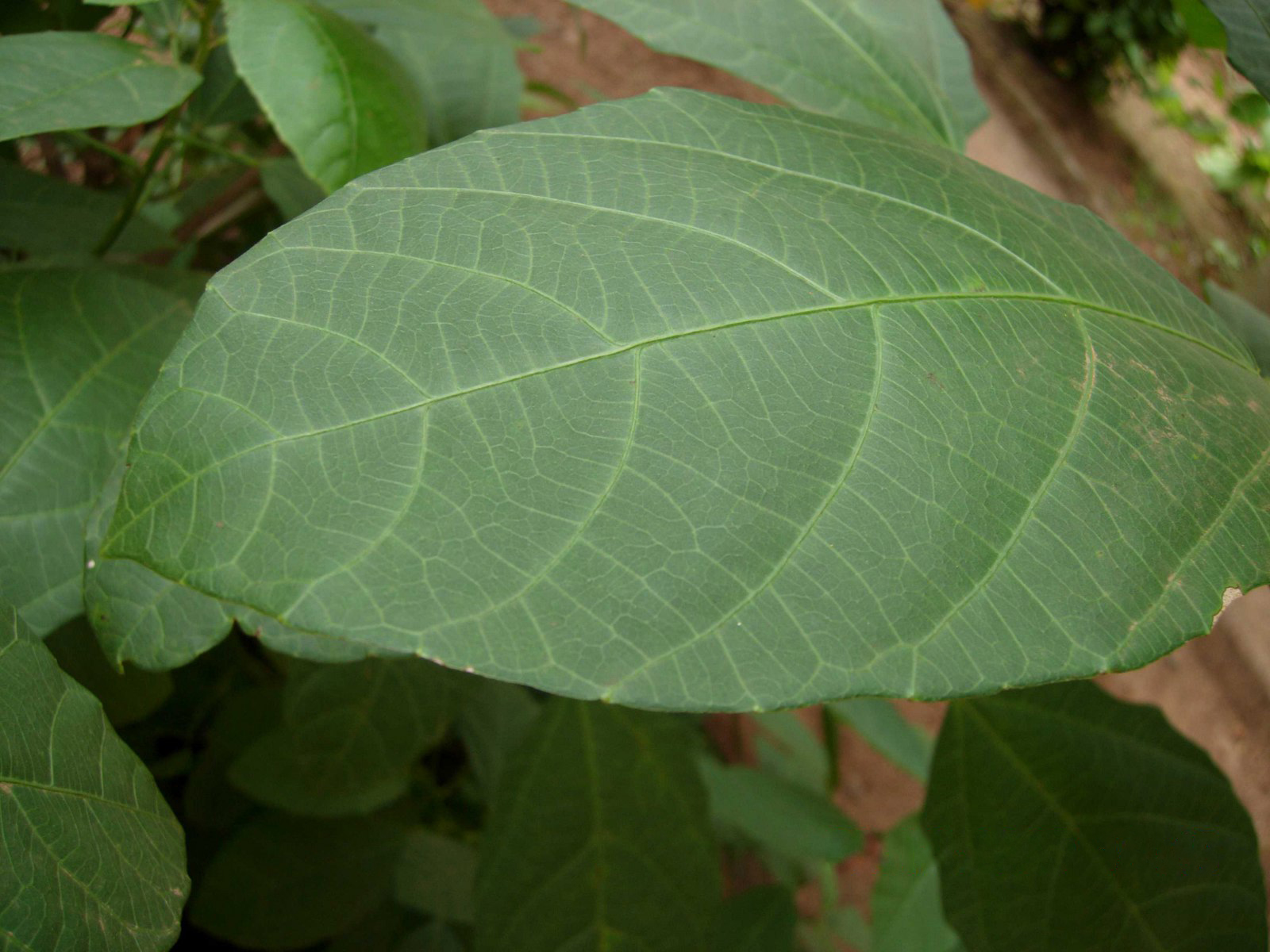
- Baliospermum solanifolium

Scientific classification
- Kingdom: Plantae
- Clade: Tracheophytes
- Clade: Angiosperms
- Clade: Eudicots
- Clade: Rosids
- Order: Malpighiales
- Family: Euphorbiaceae
- Subfamily: Crotonoideae
- Tribe: Codiaeae
- Genus: Baliospermum; Blume

= Baliospermum =

Genus of flowering plants

Baliospermum is a genus of plants under the family Euphorbiaceae first described as a genus in 1825. It is native to Southeast Asia and the Himalayas.

Species

1. Baliospermum angustifolium - Tibet
2. Baliospermum bilobatum - Tibet
3. Baliospermum calycinum - N Indochina, E Himalayas, Yunnan
4. Baliospermum solanifolium - Indochina, Himalayas, Yunnan, W Malaysia, Sumatra, Java, Lesser Sunda Islands
5. Baliospermum yui - Yunnan, Myanmar

Formerly included

moved to other genera: Cheilosa Trigonostemon

1. B. analayanum - Cheilosa montana
2. B. malayanum - Cheilosa montana
3. B. reidioides - Trigonostemon reidioides
