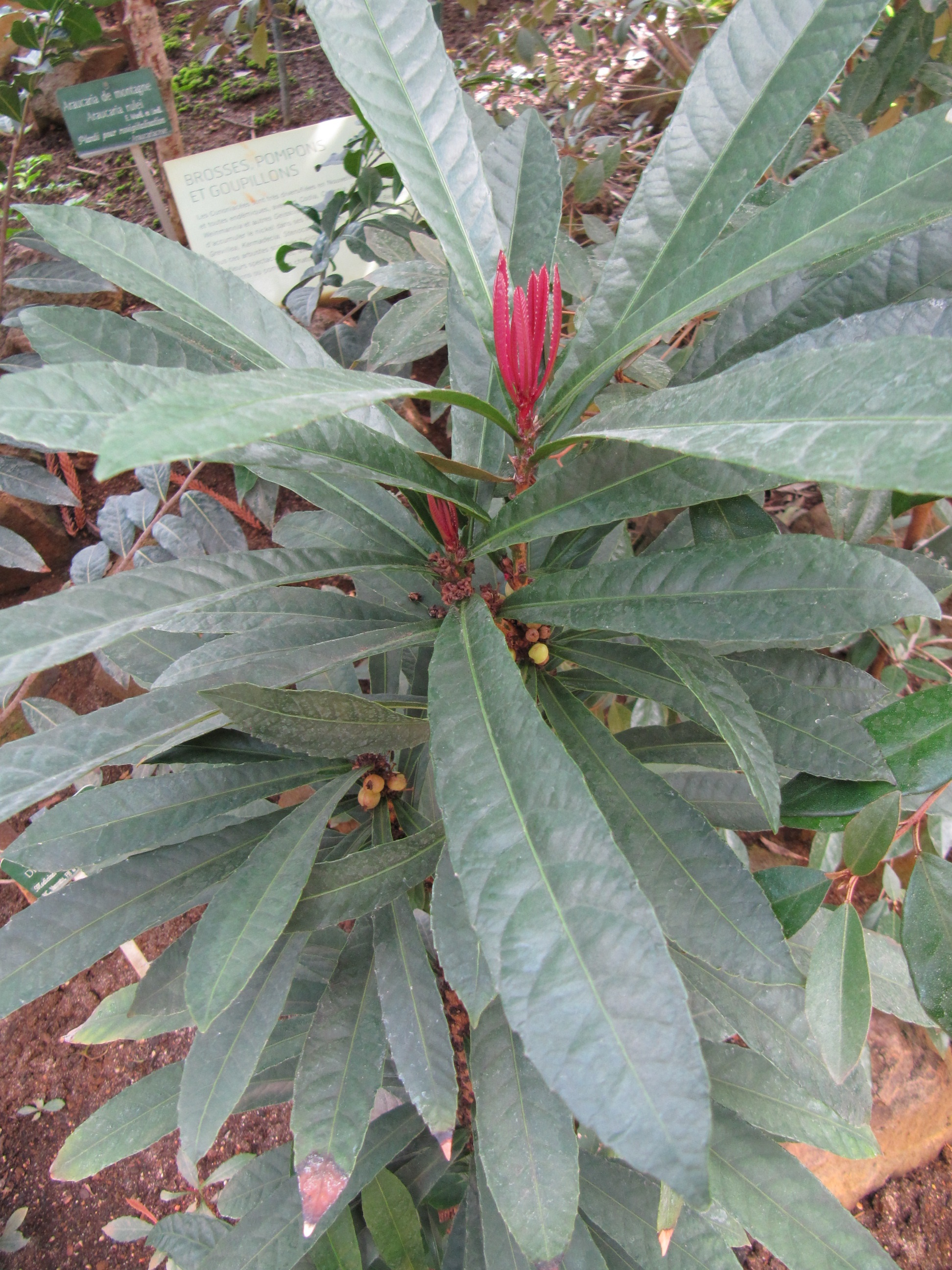
- Bocquillonia castaneifolia

Scientific classification
- Kingdom: Plantae
- Clade: Tracheophytes
- Clade: Angiosperms
- Clade: Eudicots
- Clade: Rosids
- Order: Malpighiales
- Family: Euphorbiaceae
- Subfamily: Acalyphoideae
- Tribe: Alchorneae
- Subtribe: Alchorneinae
- Genus: Bocquillonia; Baill.

Synonyms
- Ramelia Baill.

= Bocquillonia =

Genus of flowering plants

Bocquillonia is a plant genus of the family Euphorbiaceae first described as a genus in 1862. The entire genus is endemic to New Caledonia (including smaller islands that are part of the territory). Molecular phylogenetic analyses suggest that Bocquillonia is nested in Alchornea.

Species

1. Bocquillonia arborea - Îles des Pins
2. Bocquillonia brachypoda - incl Îles des Pins, Île Art
3. Bocquillonia brevipes
4. Bocquillonia castaneifolia - incl Île Art
5. Bocquillonia codonostylis - Mt. Panié Reg.
6. Bocquillonia corneri
7. Bocquillonia goniorrhachis
8. Bocquillonia grandidens
9. Bocquillonia longipes
10. Bocquillonia lucidula
11. Bocquillonia nervosa
12. Bocquillonia phenacostigma - Mt. Aoupinié
13. Bocquillonia rhomboidea - incl. Loyalty Is
14. Bocquillonia sessiliflora
15. Bocquillonia spicata
