= Alchornea sodiroi =

Conservation status
- Vulnerable (IUCN 3.1)

Scientific classification
- Kingdom: Plantae
- Clade: Tracheophytes
- Clade: Angiosperms
- Clade: Eudicots
- Clade: Rosids
- Order: Malpighiales
- Family: Euphorbiaceae
- Genus: Alchornea
- Species: A. sodiroi

Binomial name
- Alchornea sodiroi Pax & Hoffm.

Species of flowering plant

Alchornea sodiroi is a species of plant in the family Euphorbiaceae. It is endemic to Ecuador. Its natural habitat is subtropical or tropical moist montane forests.
