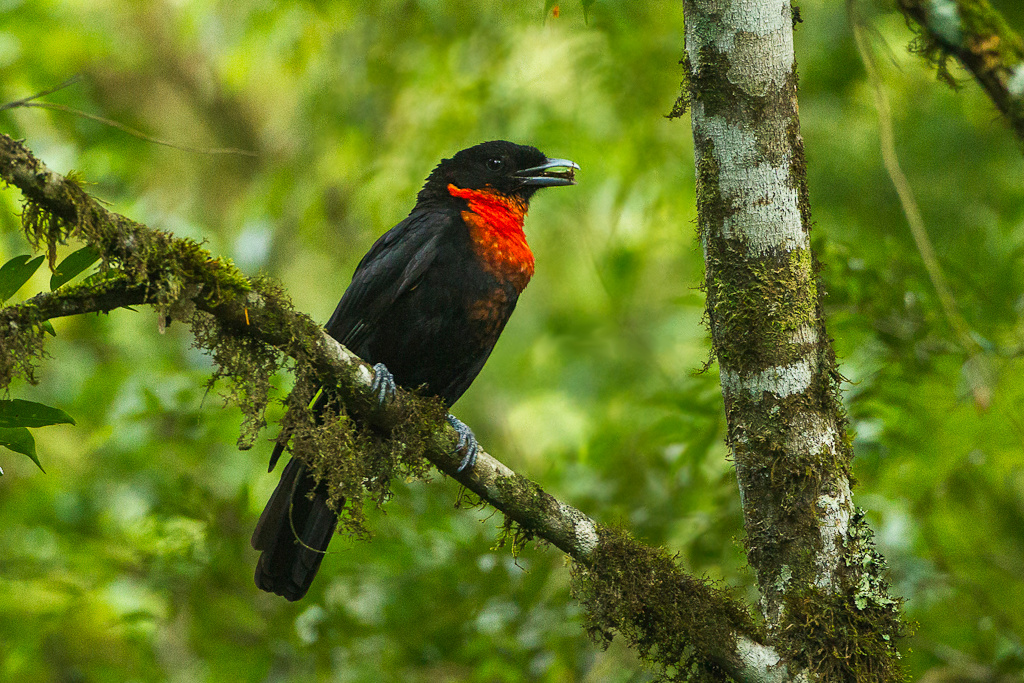
- at Intervales State Park, São Paulo state, Brazil

Conservation status
- Least Concern (IUCN 3.1)

Scientific classification
- Kingdom: Animalia
- Phylum: Chordata
- Class: Aves
- Order: Passeriformes
- Family: Cotingidae
- Genus: Pyroderus; G.R. Gray, 1840
- Species: P. scutatus

Binomial name
- Pyroderus scutatus (Shaw, 1792)

Synonyms
- Pyroderus granadensis; Coracias scutata

= Red-ruffed fruitcrow =

Species of bird

The red-ruffed fruitcrow (Pyroderus scutatus) is a species of bird in the monotypic genus Pyroderus. It belongs to the family Cotingidae, and is one of the largest passerines in South America. Its common names in Spanish include yacutoro, toropisco montañero, sangretoro, pájaro torero, and cuervo-frutero de garganta roja. This species was first named Coracias scutata by Shaw in 1792, but was later changed to the current scientific name. This species has five subspecies P. s. scutatus (Shaw, 1792), P. s. orenocensis (Lafresnaye, 1846), P. s. granadensis (Lafresnaye, 1846), P. s. masoni (Ridgway, 1886), P. s. occidentalis (Chapman, 1914).

== Description ==
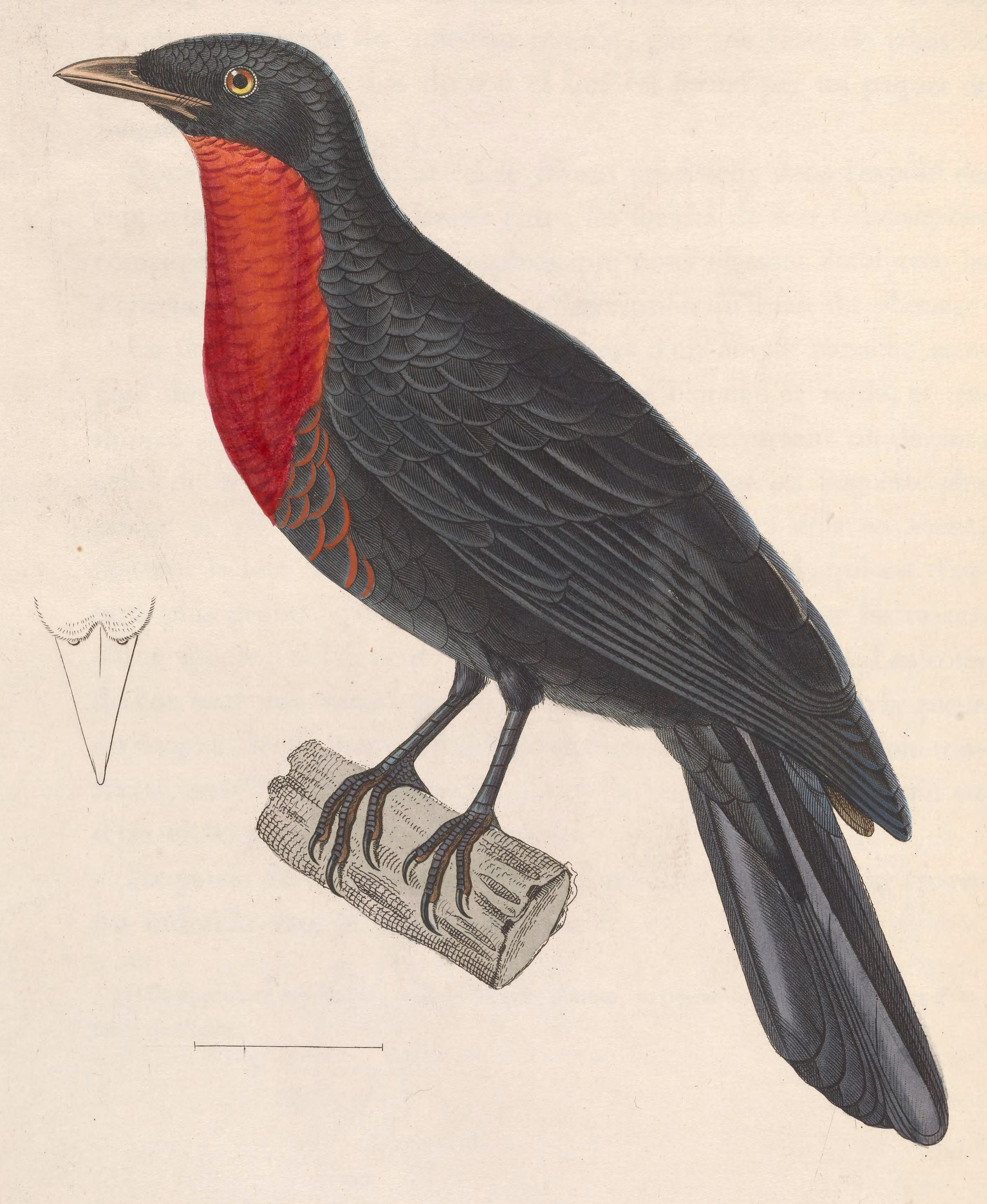
Pyroderus scutatus illustration 1838

It has a relatively heavy pale bluish bill, and the plumage is primarily black, but with a dull brown to bright orange-crimson patch on the throat depending on the subspecies, (thereby superficially resembling the smaller male purple-throated fruitcrow). Some subspecies have brown underparts. Males gather in loose leks where they call to attract the smaller, but otherwise similar, females.

=== Subspecies description ===
Pyroderus scutatus scutatus is the nominated subspecies with a glossy black back with some iridescence. A crimson patch is present covering the throat while some coverts are a dull chestnut. The feet are wholly black and the bill is a light grey. Females are almost identical, but slightly smaller and with a slightly duller ruff.

Pyroderus scutatus orenocensis is more dull instead of the glossy black seen in P. s. scutatus. It also has a fully chestnut breast.

Pyroderus scutatus granadensis has the same appearance as P. s. scutatus, but is significantly smaller with length 14 in, wing 8.5 in and tail 5 in.

Pyroderus scutatus masoni is black above and a dull dark brown/chestnut below that turns mottled to black as it approaches the undertail coverts. The chin and chest are a crimson with a black strip dividing the bright chest from the chestnut belly.

Pyroderus scutatus occidentalis appears very similar to P. s. masoni, but the color is more bright and uniform with the chestnut belly complete instead of mottled.

== Distribution and habitat ==
Its distribution is highly disjunct, with population associated to northeastern Venezuela and Guyana, the east Andean slopes in Peru, Andean slopes in north-western Ecuador, Colombia and western Venezuela, the Venezuelan Coastal Range and the Atlantic Forest in south-eastern Brazil, eastern Paraguay and far north-eastern Argentina. It is found in humid forest, especially in highlands, but are also found in forest borders, Amazon lowlands, and in slightly drier forest.

The largest population of P. s. scutatus can be found in the Atlantic Forest in SE Brazil. The high population is speculated due to a lack of competition in the area Other P. s. scutatus are found in east Paraguay and northeast Argentina in Misiones.

Pyroderus scutatus orenocensis is only found in northeast Bolívar, a state in east Venezuela.

Pyroderus scutatus granadensis lives in the Andes in Colombia and Venezuela. Specifically, it is found in the east Andes, eastern slope of the central Andes in Colombia, Serranía de Perijá, east of Distrito Federal along the mountains, and the Andes in Venezuela.

Pyroderus scutatus masoni is located in the Andes of northern and central Peru. It has been recently confirmed in southeast Ecuador in Cordillera del Cóndor.

Pyroderus scutatus occidentalis is found in the west Andes in Colombia and in the western slope of the central Andes in Colombia to northwest Ecuador, specifically Imbabura, Carchi, and Santo Domingo de los Tsachilas.

== Behavior and ecology ==
=== Breeding ===
The nest is cup shaped, normally shallow, and is made of twigs which may be lined with fern fronds. These materials allow light to pass through. Normal clutch size is one egg. There has been very little research on the reproductive biology of P. scutatus. The literature is incomplete on the breeding strategies of all the subspecies, but P. s. granadensis and P. s. scutatus have been described.

Pyroderus scutatus granadensis Shallow open cup shaped nests consist of twigs, with the inter lined with fern fronds. Nests are found near streams in steep drainages. Clutch sizes consistently a single egg with an average incubation time of 22.3 days.

Pyroderus scutatus scutatus Nest of this subspecies are unusually well made compared to all other subspecies described. The nest is bulky and substantial, not allowing light to pass through. The inside nest diameter of the cup is 16.5 cm (6.5 in), and height 5 cm (2.0 in), with the outside nest diameter 38 cm (15 in), and height 11.3 cm (4.4 in). Nests have been found on honey wood trees (Alchornea triplinervia) and though the nests do not have any camouflage built into them, they are built within ferns on an inaccessible branch, hiding and protecting the nest. Though normal clutch size for P. scutatus is one, and always one for P. s. granadensis, two nestlings have been observed for P. s. scutatus. Young nestlings appear with brown, thick down, which is mainly missing from throat, but is concentrated on the head. The nearly bare skin on the throat is a bright pink and the beak is yellow.

=== Food and feeding ===
Pyroderus scutatus are omnivores, feeding on fruit, insects, and lizards with fruit making up the majority of the adults diet.

Pyroderus scutatus granadensis feeding patterns of the nestlings change with age. When the nestlings first start eating the parents will bring them mainly insects (66.7%) and lizards (25%) with fruit only making up about 8.3%. Only in the late stages of the nestling period does the diet change to mainly fruit (82.4%) with insects making up the minority (17.6%).

=== Survival ===
The nest defense strategy of P. scutatus is to leave the nest and chase the potential threat away. A common threat is a predator like a hawk or another Red-ruffed Fruitcrow entering the territory near the nest. P. s. scutatus has been observed diligently check the surrounding area for several seconds on a branch around 10 to 15 meters away from the nest before feeding the nestlings. It is thought that it is checking for predators as to not lead any to the nest.

== Relation to humans ==
The local people have been known to treat Cotingas as game birds, especially the red-ruffed Fruitcrow who is one of the largest in the family.

== Status and conservation ==
While generally a low-density species, it remains widespread and is locally not rare, but many of the populations are in decline, most likely due to habitat fragmentation and degradation of the ecosystem. BirdLife International and the IUCN has rated this species Least Concern, but P. s. scutatus is listed as endangered by many Brazilian states including Rio Grande do Sul, São Paulo, Minas Gerais, and Rio de Janeiro due to the deforestation of the Atlantic Forest. There is also a correlation between the decline of P. scutatus and the rapid reduction of seed size of palm fruit. With local extinctions of P. scutatus, less palm fruit seeds are being eaten, digested, and excreted, leading to a decline in the dispersal of the seeds and a rapid reduction of seed size of palm fruit.
