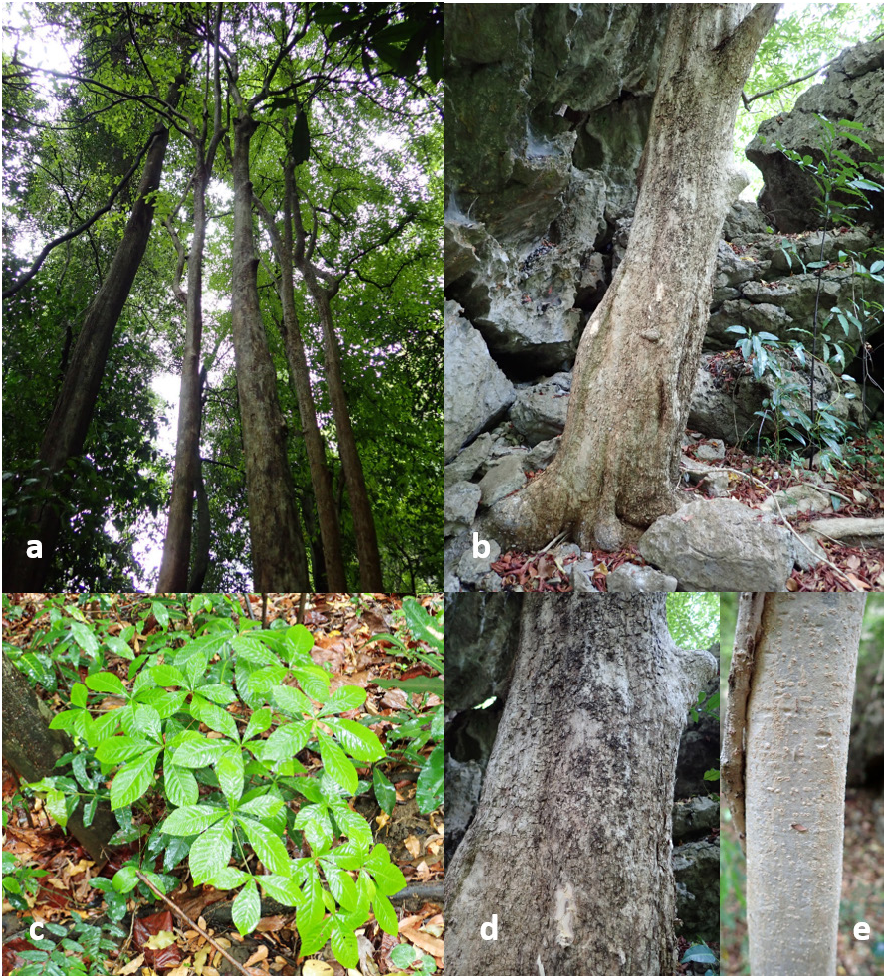
- Paranecepsia andrafiabensis

Scientific classification
- Kingdom: Plantae
- Clade: Tracheophytes
- Clade: Angiosperms
- Clade: Eudicots
- Clade: Rosids
- Order: Malpighiales
- Family: Euphorbiaceae
- Subfamily: Acalyphoideae
- Tribe: Bernardieae
- Genus: Paranecepsia; Radcl.-Sm.

= Paranecepsia =

Genus of flowering plants

Paranecepsia is a plant genus of the family Euphorbiaceae, first described in 1976.

As of August 2024, Plants of the World Online accepted these species:

- Paranecepsia alchorneifolia Radcl.-Sm.
- Paranecepsia andrafiabensis Barberá & O.Lachenaud
