= Amyrea =

Scientific classification
- Kingdom: Plantae
- Clade: Tracheophytes
- Clade: Angiosperms
- Clade: Eudicots
- Clade: Rosids
- Order: Malpighiales
- Family: Euphorbiaceae
- Subfamily: Acalyphoideae
- Tribe: Bernardieae
- Genus: Amyrea; Leandri

Genus of flowering plants

Amyrea is a plant genus of the family Euphorbiaceae first described as a genus in 1941. It is native to Madagascar and to nearby Mayotte Island in the Indian Ocean.

Species

1. Amyrea celastroides Radcl.-Sm. - Madagascar
2. Amyrea eucleoides Radcl.-Sm. - Madagascar
3. Amyrea gracillima Radcl.-Sm. - Madagascar
4. Amyrea grandifolia Radcl.-Sm. - Madagascar
5. Amyrea humbertii Leandri - Mayotte, Madagascar
6. Amyrea lancifolia Radcl.-Sm. - Madagascar
7. Amyrea maprouneifolia Radcl.-Sm. - Madagascar
8. Amyrea myrtifolia Radcl.-Sm. - Madagascar
9. Amyrea remotiflora Radcl.-Sm. - Madagascar
10. Amyrea sambiranensis Leandri - Madagascar
11. Amyrea stenocarpa Radcl.-Sm. - Madagascar
