= Adenophaedra =

- Illustration of Adenophaedra megalophylla accompanying its protologue.

Scientific classification
- Kingdom: Plantae
- Clade: Tracheophytes
- Clade: Angiosperms
- Clade: Eudicots
- Clade: Rosids
- Order: Malpighiales
- Family: Euphorbiaceae
- Subfamily: Acalyphoideae
- Tribe: Bernardieae
- Genus: Adenophaedra (Mull.Arg.) Mull.Arg.

Type species
- Adenophaedra megaphylla (Mull.Arg.) Mull.Arg.

Synonyms
- Bernardia Section Adenophaedra Mull.Arg. in Linnaea 34:172, 1865

Genus of flowering plants

Adenophaedra is a plant genus of the family Euphorbiaceae first described as a genus in 1874. It is native to tropical regions of South America and Central America.

Species

1. Adenophaedra cearensis Secco - Ceará
2. Adenophaedra grandifolia (Klotzsch) Müll.Arg. - Costa Rica, Panama, Colombia, Venezuela, Guyana, French Guiana, Ecuador, Peru, NW Brazil
3. Adenophaedra megaphylla (Mull.Arg.) Mull.Arg. - Colombia, Ecuador, Peru, Suriname, E Brazil
