= C12H19N3O =

The molecular formula C_{12}H_{19}N_{3}O (molar mass: 221.29 g/mol, exact mass: 221.1528 u) may refer to:

- Procarbazine, a drug against cancer
- Alchorneine, an alkaloid
