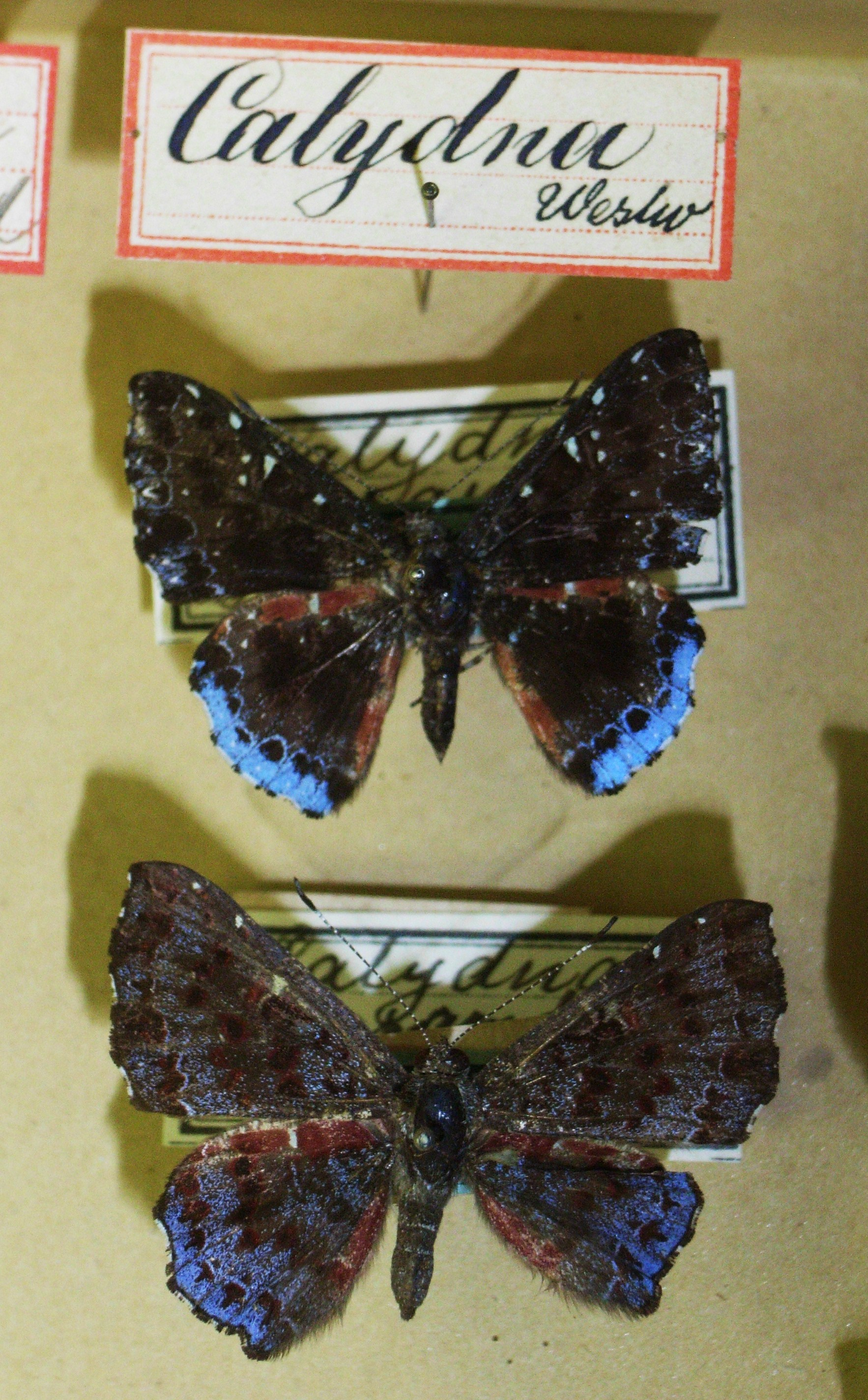
- Calydna species from Museum Wiesbaden

Scientific classification
- Kingdom: Animalia
- Phylum: Arthropoda
- Class: Insecta
- Order: Lepidoptera
- Family: Riodinidae
- Subfamily: Riodininae
- Genus: Calydna; Doubleday, 1847

Species
- See text

= Calydna (butterfly) =

Genus of butterflies

Calydna is a genus of butterflies in the family Riodinidae. They are resident in the Neotropics.

Species of Calydna feed as larvae on Olacaceae, Euphorbiaceae, Schoepfia, Ximenia and Conceveiba.

== Species list ==
- Calydna cabira Hewitson, 1854 French Guiana, Brazil
- Calydna caieta Hewitson, 1854 French Guiana, Brazil
- Calydna calamisa Hewitson, 1854 Brazil
- Calydna candace Hewitson, 1859 Brazil
- Calydna carneia Hewitson, 1859 Brazil
- Calydna catana Hewitson, 1859 Venezuela, Brazil
- Calydna cea Hewitson, 1859 Brazil, Peru
- Calydna charila Hewitson, 1854 Brazil, Peru
- Calydna fissilisima Hall, 2002 Brazil
- Calydna hiria (Godart, [1824]) Brazil, Peru
- Calydna jeannea Hall, 2002 Peru
- Calydna lusca (Geyer, [1835]) Mexico, Peru
- Calydna micra Bates, 1868 Brazil
- Calydna nicolayi Hall, 2002 Peru
- Calydna stolata Brévignon, 1998 French Guiana
- Calydna thersander (Stoll, [1780]) French Guiana, Guyana, Suriname, Brazil
- Calydna sturnula (Geyer, 1837) Mexico, Brazil
- Calydna venusta Godman & Salvin, [1886] Mexico, Panama, Colombia, Venezuela, Trinidad and Tobago, French Guiana, Guyana, Suriname, Brazil

== Sources ==
- Calydna at Markku Savela's website on Lepidoptera
