= Aubletiana =

Scientific classification
- Kingdom: Plantae
- Clade: Tracheophytes
- Clade: Angiosperms
- Clade: Eudicots
- Clade: Rosids
- Order: Malpighiales
- Family: Euphorbiaceae
- Subfamily: Acalyphoideae
- Tribe: Alchorneae
- Subtribe: Alchorneinae
- Genus: Aubletiana; J.Murillo

Genus of flowering plants

Aubletiana is a plant genus of the family Euphorbiaceae, first described as a genus in 2000. It is native to tropical Africa.

Species

1. Aubletiana leptostachys (Breteler) J.Murillo - Cameroon, Gabon
2. Aubletiana macrostachys (Breteler) J.Murillo - Gabon
