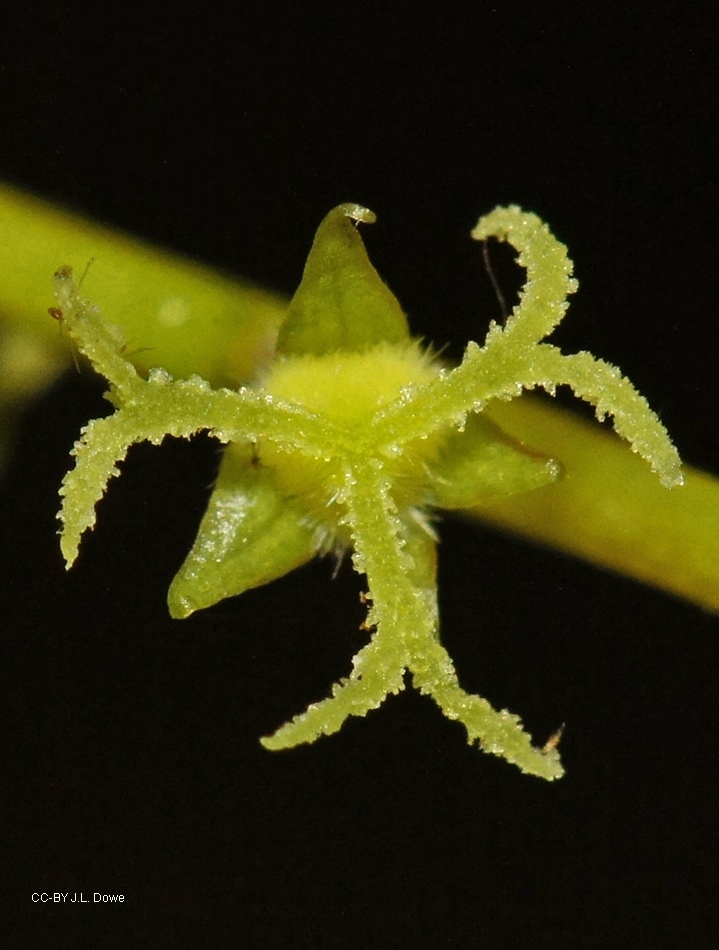
- Female flower

Conservation status
- Endangered (IUCN 3.1)
- Critically Endangered (NCA)

Scientific classification
- Kingdom: Plantae
- Clade: Embryophytes
- Clade: Tracheophytes
- Clade: Angiosperms
- Clade: Eudicots
- Clade: Rosids
- Order: Malpighiales
- Family: Euphorbiaceae
- Genus: Wetria
- Species: W. australiensis

Binomial name
- Wetria australiensis P.I.Forst.

= Wetria australiensis =

Species of flowering plant

Wetria australiensis is a species of plant in the family Euphorbiaceae, native to Papua New Guinea and the state of Queensland, Australia. It is a small tree to about 15 m (49 ft) tall, first described in 1994 by New Zealand-born botanist Paul Irwin Forster.

== Distribution and habitat ==
The species is known from a very small area of rainforest just west of Cairns, Queensland, and two isolated occurrences in Papua New Guinea. When first described it was only known from the site near Cairns.

== Conservation ==
As of March 2025, this species has been assessed to be endangered by the International Union for Conservation of Nature (IUCN) and critically endangered by the Queensland Government under its Nature Conservation Act.

== Gallery ==
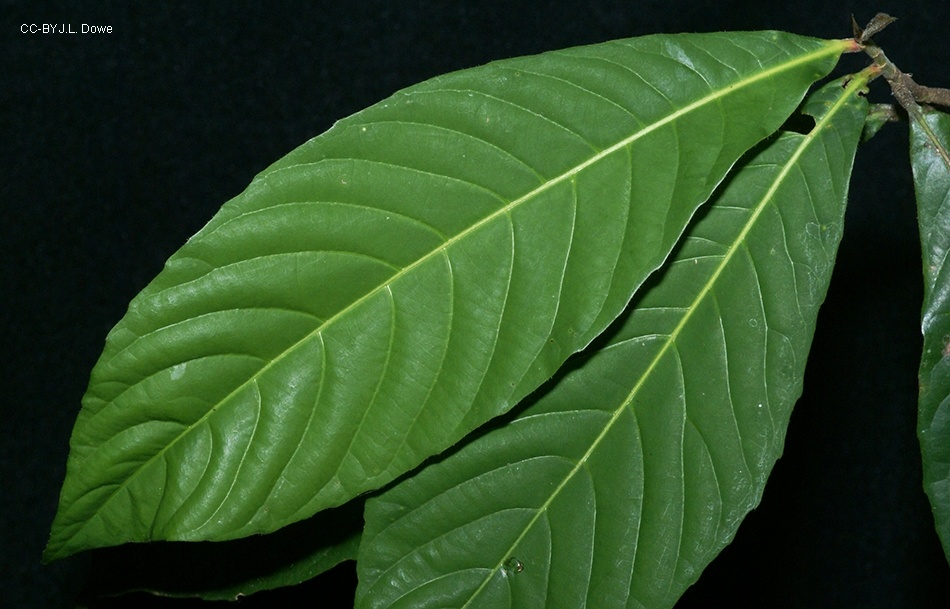
Foliage

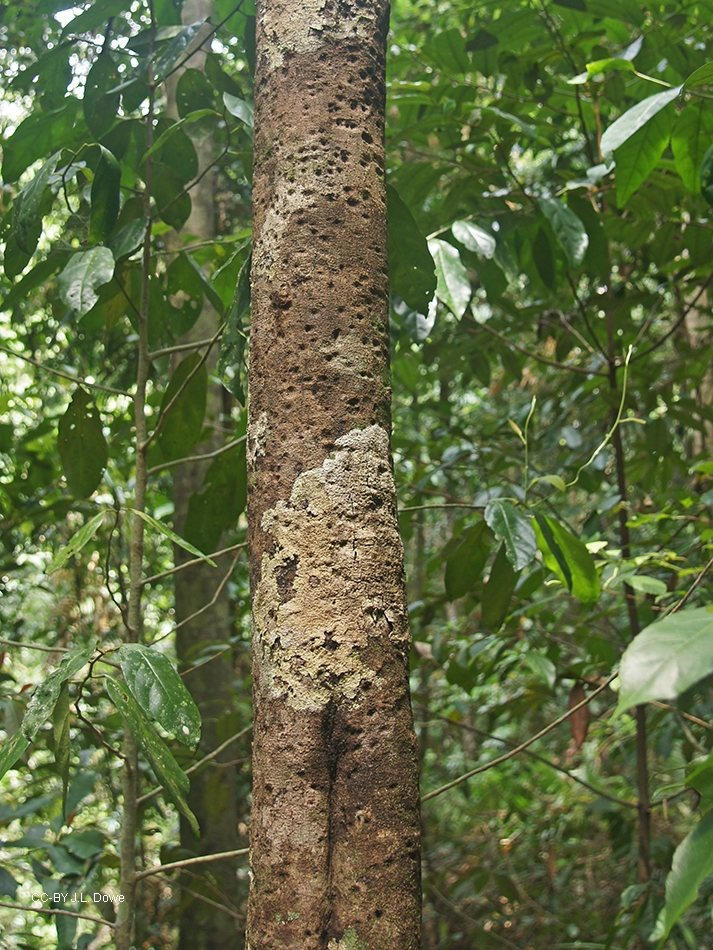
Trunk
