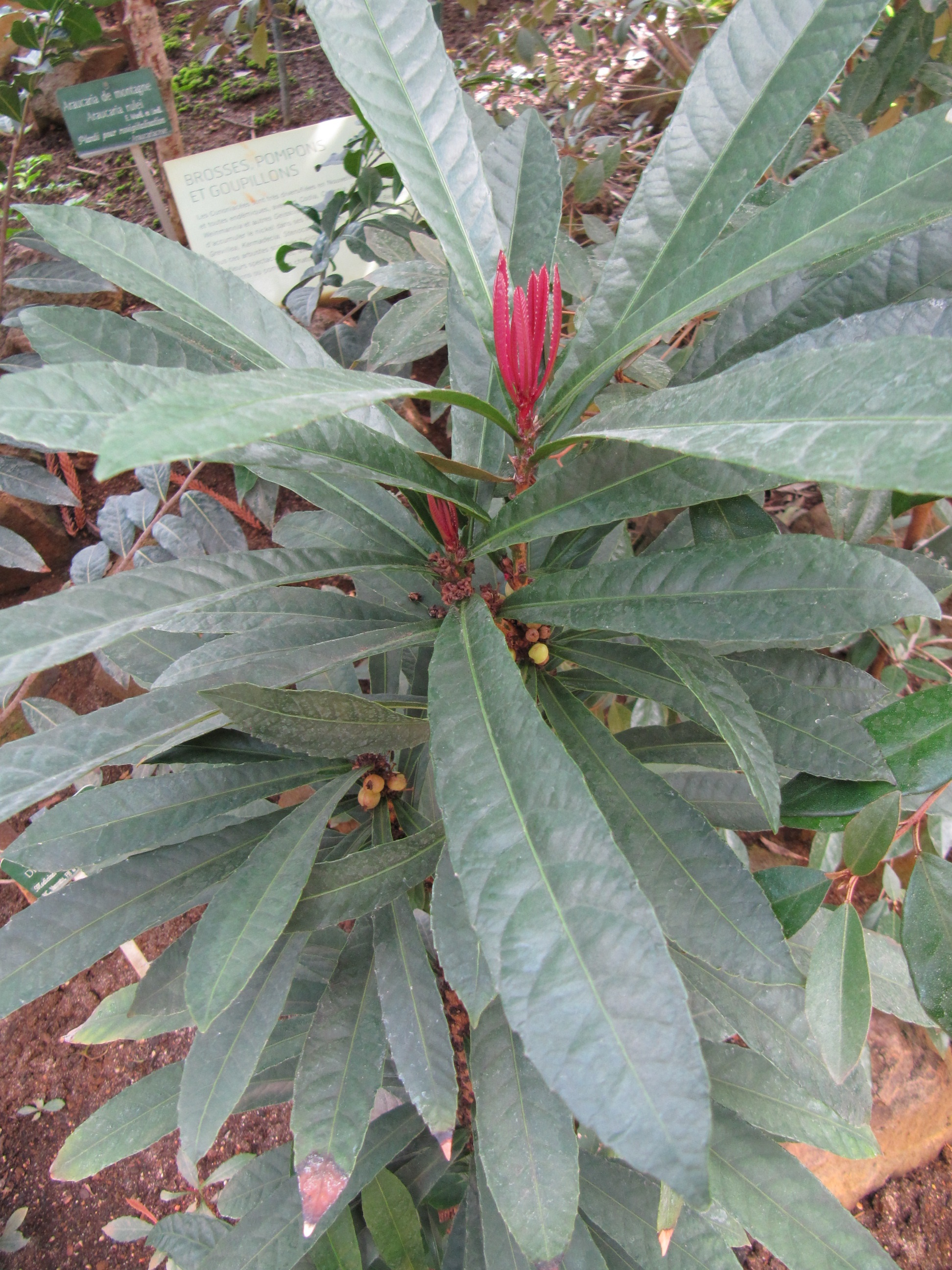

Conservation status
- Critically Endangered (IUCN 3.1)

Scientific classification
- Kingdom: Plantae
- Clade: Tracheophytes
- Clade: Angiosperms
- Clade: Eudicots
- Clade: Rosids
- Order: Malpighiales
- Family: Euphorbiaceae
- Genus: Bocquillonia
- Species: B. castaneifolia

Binomial name
- Bocquillonia castaneifolia Guillaumin

= Bocquillonia castaneifolia =

Species of flowering plant

Bocquillonia castaneifolia is a species of plant in the family Euphorbiaceae. It is endemic to New Caledonia.
