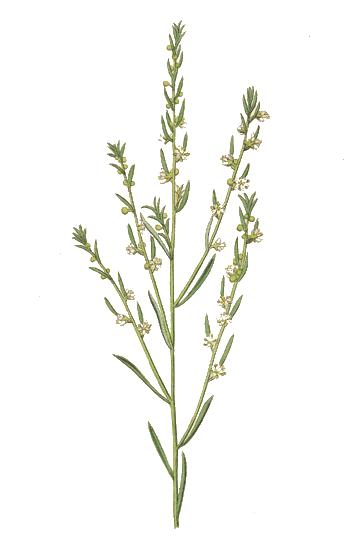
- Cluytia ericoides

Scientific classification
- Kingdom: Plantae
- Clade: Tracheophytes
- Clade: Angiosperms
- Clade: Eudicots
- Clade: Rosids
- Order: Malpighiales
- Family: Euphorbiaceae
- Subfamily: Acalyphoideae
- Tribe: Clutieae; Pax in Engl. & Prantl, Nat. Pflanzenfam. III, 5: 14. Mai 1890 (Cluytieae)

Genera
- Subtribe Clutiinae Müll.-Arg., Linnaea 34: 202. Jul 1865 (Cluytieae).; Clutia L. (1753); Kleinodendron

= Clutieae =

Extinct tribe of flowering plants

Clutieae was a tribe of plant of the family Euphorbiaceae. It comprised 2 genera, Clutia and Kleinodendron. Clutia is now included in the family Peraceae, and Kleinodendron is included in the family Phyllanthaceae

== See also ==
- Taxonomy of the Euphorbiaceae
