= Paranecepsia alchorneifolia =

Conservation status
- Vulnerable (IUCN 3.1)

Scientific classification
- Kingdom: Plantae
- Clade: Tracheophytes
- Clade: Angiosperms
- Clade: Eudicots
- Clade: Rosids
- Order: Malpighiales
- Family: Euphorbiaceae
- Genus: Paranecepsia
- Species: P. alchorneifolia

Binomial name
- Paranecepsia alchorneifolia Radcl.-Sm.

Species of flowering plant

Paranecepsia alchorneifolia is a plant in the family Euphorbiaceae. It is native to southeastern Africa (eastern Tanzania and northern Mozambique).

The species has been assessed as vulnerable on the IUCN Red List.
