= Bocquillonia arborea =

Conservation status
- Endangered (IUCN 3.1)

Scientific classification
- Kingdom: Plantae
- Clade: Tracheophytes
- Clade: Angiosperms
- Clade: Eudicots
- Clade: Rosids
- Order: Malpighiales
- Family: Euphorbiaceae
- Genus: Bocquillonia
- Species: B. arborea

Binomial name
- Bocquillonia arborea Airy Shaw

Species of flowering plant

Bocquillonia arborea is a species of plant in the family Euphorbiaceae. It is endemic to New Caledonia.
