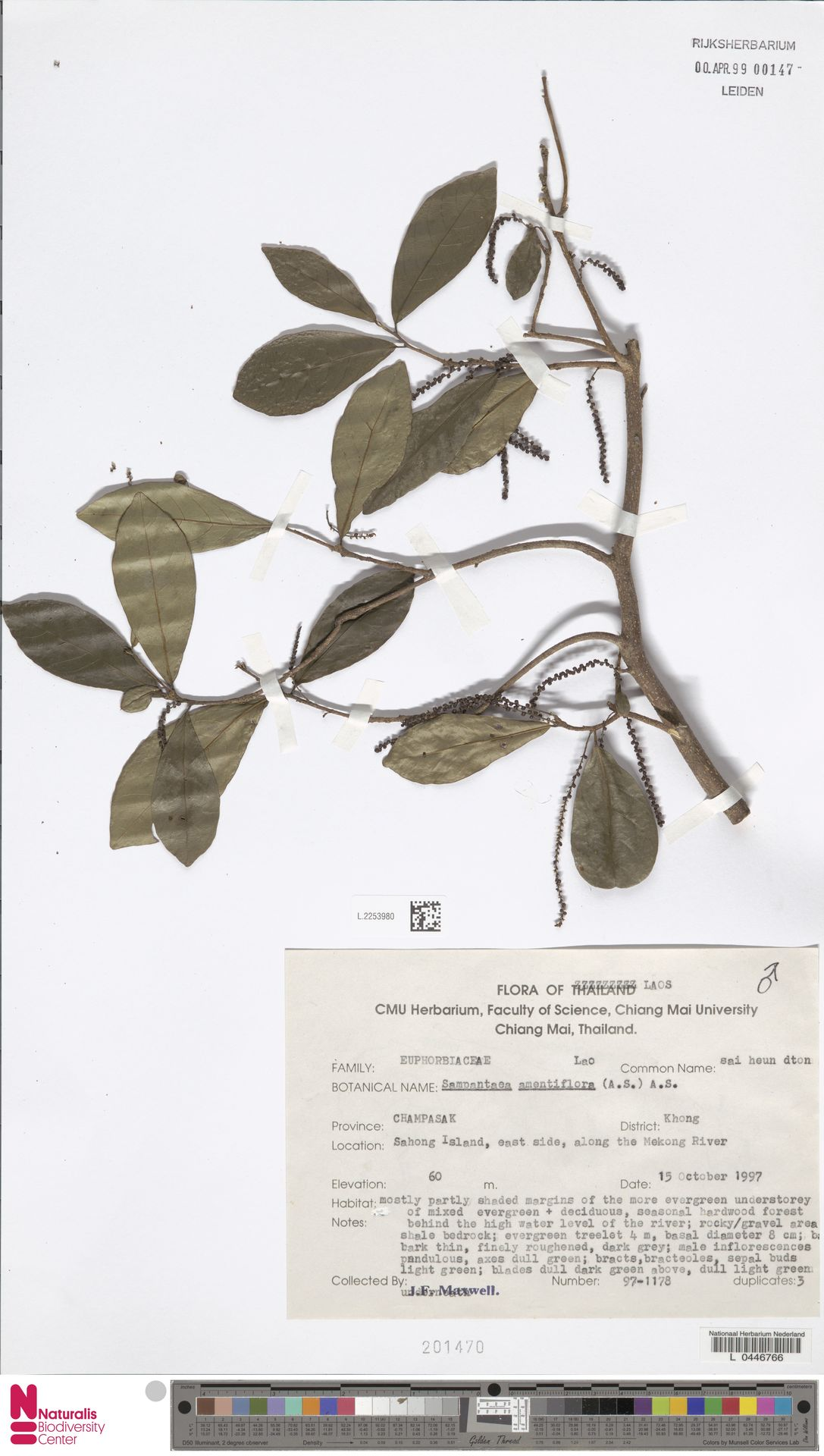

Scientific classification
- Kingdom: Plantae
- Clade: Tracheophytes
- Clade: Angiosperms
- Clade: Eudicots
- Clade: Rosids
- Order: Malpighiales
- Family: Euphorbiaceae
- Subfamily: Acalyphoideae
- Tribe: Acalypheae
- Subtribe: Cleidiinae
- Genus: Sampantaea; Airy Shaw
- Species: S. amentiflora

Binomial name
- Sampantaea amentiflora (Airy Shaw) Airy Shaw

Synonyms
- Alchornea amentiflora Airy Shaw

= Sampantaea =

Species of plant

Sampantaea amentiflora is a plant species of the family Euphorbiaceae, first described as a genus in 1972. The genus Sampantaea is monotypic and found in Thailand and Cambodia.
