= Alchornea integrifolia =

Conservation status
- Endangered (IUCN 3.1)

Scientific classification
- Kingdom: Plantae
- Clade: Tracheophytes
- Clade: Angiosperms
- Clade: Eudicots
- Clade: Rosids
- Order: Malpighiales
- Family: Euphorbiaceae
- Genus: Alchornea
- Species: A. integrifolia

Binomial name
- Alchornea integrifolia Pax & K.Hoffm.

Species of tree

Alchornea integrifolia is a plant species in the family Euphorbiaceae. It is endemic to Guatemala where it has only been found in the departments of Alta Verapaz and Baja Verapaz. It is a tree of 6-25 m that grows in swampy broadleaf forest at an altitude of 1000–1500 m.
