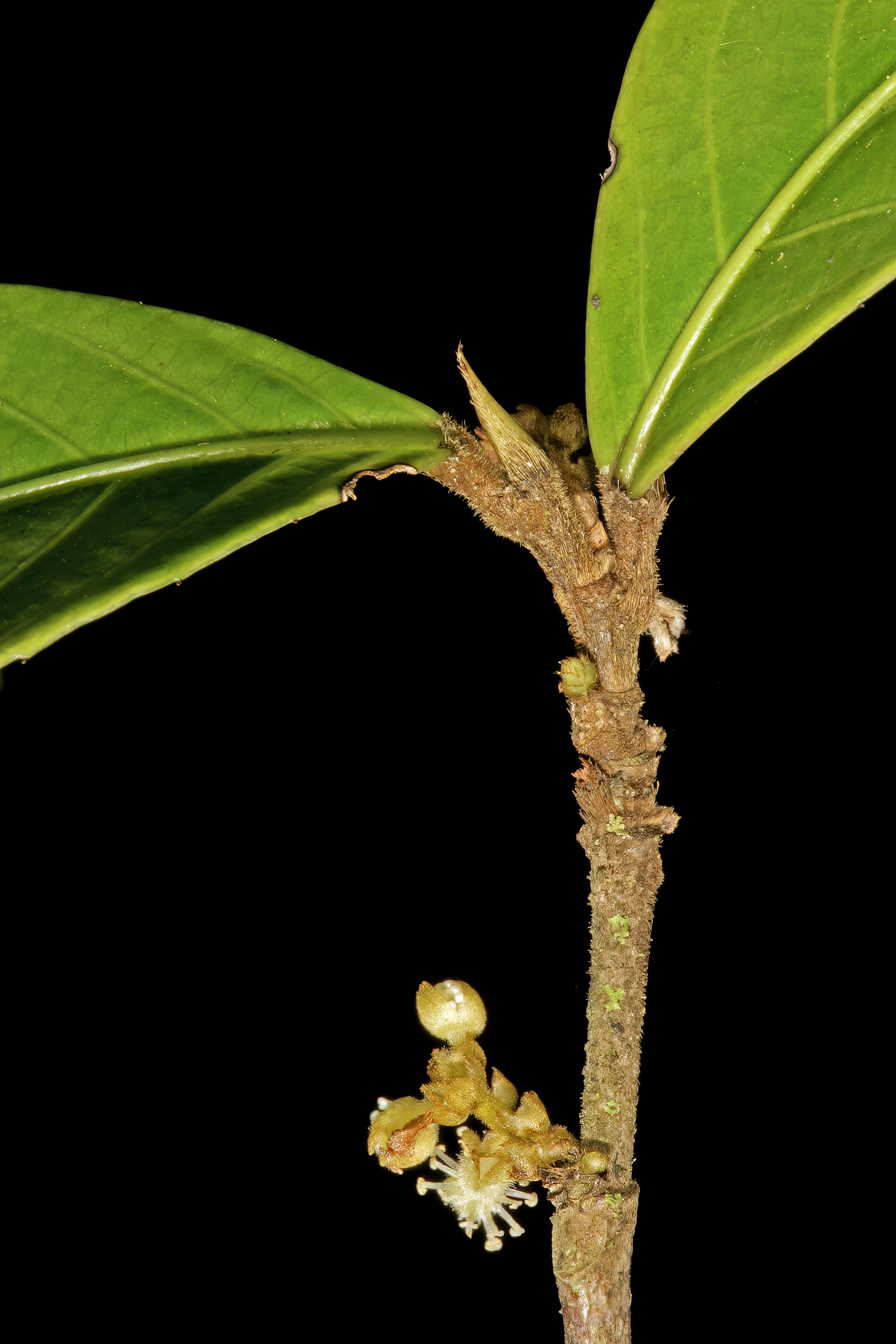
- Necepsia castaneifolia

Scientific classification
- Kingdom: Plantae
- Clade: Tracheophytes
- Clade: Angiosperms
- Clade: Eudicots
- Clade: Rosids
- Order: Malpighiales
- Family: Euphorbiaceae
- Subfamily: Acalyphoideae
- Tribe: Bernardieae
- Genus: Necepsia; Prain

Type species
- Necepsia afzelii Prain

Synonyms
- Neopalissya Pax; Palissya Baill.

= Necepsia =

Genus of flowering plants

Necepsia is a plant genus of the family Euphorbiaceae first described as a genus in 1910. It is native to Madagascar and to tropical Africa.

Species

1. Necepsia afzelii Prain - Liberia, Sierra Leone, Ivory Coast, Ghana, Cameroon, Congo, Cabinda, Gabon
2. Necepsia castaneifolia (Baill.) Bouchat & J.Léonard - Tanzania, Zimbabwe, Madagascar
3. Necepsia zairensis Bouchat & J.Léonard - Congo, Zaire
