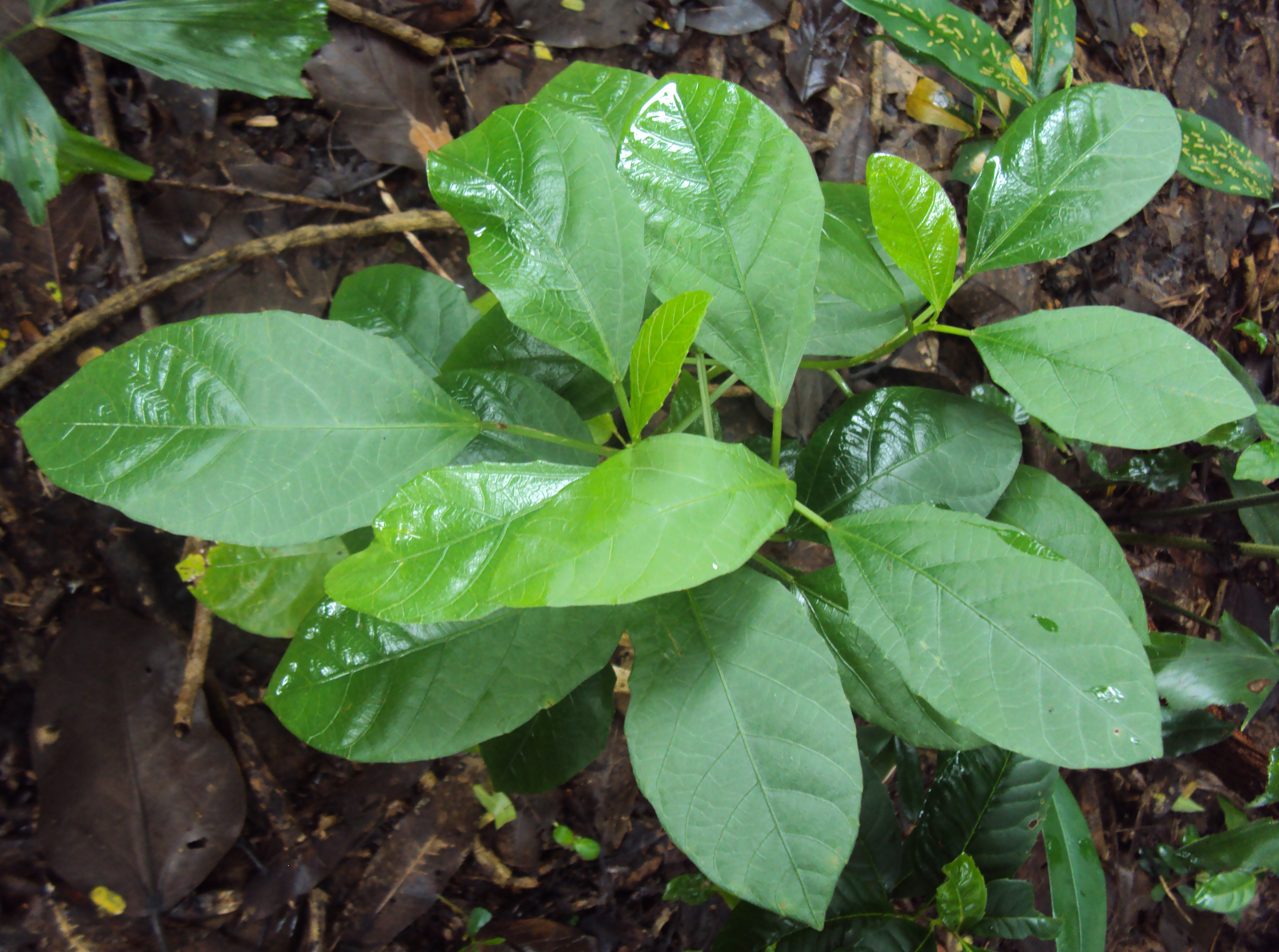

Scientific classification
- Kingdom: Plantae
- Clade: Tracheophytes
- Clade: Angiosperms
- Clade: Eudicots
- Clade: Rosids
- Order: Malpighiales
- Family: Euphorbiaceae
- Genus: Baliospermum
- Species: B. solanifolium

Binomial name
- Baliospermum solanifolium (Burm.) Suresh

Synonyms
- Baliospermum angulare Decne. ex Baill.; Baliospermum axillare var. dioicum Haines; Baliospermum axillare Blume; Baliospermum indicum Decne.; Baliospermum montanum (Willd.) Müll.Arg.; Baliospermum montanum var. dioicum (Haines) Haines; Baliospermum montanum var. heterophyllum Gagnep.; Baliospermum moritzianum Baill.; Baliospermum pendulinum Pax; Baliospermum polyandrum Wight, nom. superfl.; Baliospermum raziana Keshaw, Murthy & Yogan.; Croton polyandrus Roxb., nom. illeg.; Croton roxburghii Wall.; Croton solanifolius Burm.; Jatropha montana Willd.; Ricinus montanus (Willd.) Roxb. ex Benth.

= Baliospermum solanifolium =

Species of plant

Baliospermum solanifolium, synonym Baliospermum montanum, is a plant in the family Euphorbiaceae. It is commonly known as red physic nut, wild castor, wild croton or wild sultan seed. It is a stout undershrub with numerous flowers.

== Description ==
Baliospermum solanifolium is a stout under-shrub 0.9-1.8 m in height with herbaceous branches from the roots. Leaves are simple, sinuate-toothed, upper ones small, lower ones large and sometimes palmately 3-5 lobed. Flowers are numerous, arranged in axillary racemes with male flowers above and a few females below. Fruits are capsules, 8-13 mm long and obovoid. Seeds are ellipsoid smooth and mottled.

== Distribution ==
Baliospermum solanifolium is distributed from China to tropical Asia. It is found throughout the sub-Himalayan tracts from Khasi Hills to Kashmir. It is common in Bihar, West Bengal, and Peninsular and Central India.

== Phytochemistry ==
Compounds isolated from this plant include steroids, triterpenoids, diterpenes, glycosides, saponins, alkaloids, and polyphenols. The stems and leaves had the highest total phenolic content, which can be attributed to the existence of tannins in this plant.
