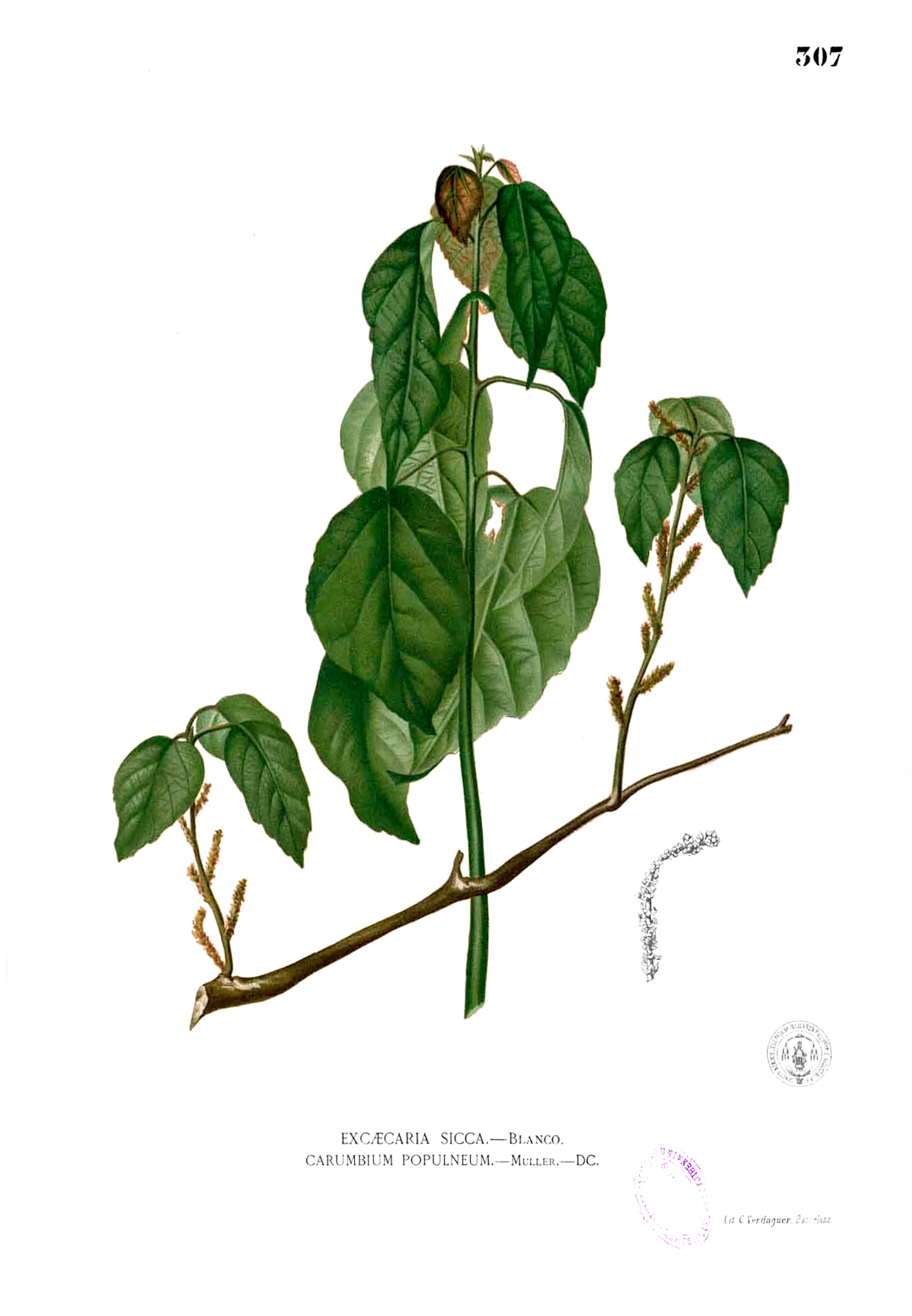
- Alchornea sicca

Scientific classification
- Kingdom: Plantae
- Clade: Tracheophytes
- Clade: Angiosperms
- Clade: Eudicots
- Clade: Rosids
- Order: Malpighiales
- Family: Euphorbiaceae
- Subfamily: Acalyphoideae
- Tribe: Alchorneae (Hurus.) Hutch.

Subtribes and genera
- Subtribe Alchorneinae Alchornea Aparisthmium Aubletiana Bocquillonia Orfilea Subtribe Conceveibinae Conceveiba Gavarretia Polyandra

= Alchorneae =

Tribe of flowering plants

Alchorneae is a tribe of plants in the subfamily Acalyphoideae, under the family Euphorbiaceae. It comprises 2 subtribes and 7 genera.

== See also ==
- Taxonomy of the Euphorbiaceae
