= Bocquillonia longipes =

Conservation status
- Vulnerable (IUCN 3.1)

Scientific classification
- Kingdom: Plantae
- Clade: Tracheophytes
- Clade: Angiosperms
- Clade: Eudicots
- Clade: Rosids
- Order: Malpighiales
- Family: Euphorbiaceae
- Genus: Bocquillonia
- Species: B. longipes

Binomial name
- Bocquillonia longipes McPherson

Species of flowering plant

Bocquillonia longipes is a species of plant in the family Euphorbiaceae. It is endemic to New Caledonia.
