= Alchornea floribunda =

Conservation status
- Least Concern (IUCN 3.1)

Scientific classification
- Kingdom: Plantae
- Clade: Tracheophytes
- Clade: Angiosperms
- Clade: Eudicots
- Clade: Rosids
- Order: Malpighiales
- Family: Euphorbiaceae
- Genus: Alchornea
- Species: A. floribunda

Binomial name
- Alchornea floribunda Müll. Arg.

Species of plant

Alchornea floribunda is a plant native to tropical Africa. The plant is locally known as Niando.

== Description ==
Alchornea floribunda is a large, straggly shrub that grows into a bush about 4.5 metres (15 ft) tall.

== Uses ==
This plant has many traditional uses. The leaves are sometimes cooked and eaten as a vegetable and may be eaten with meat or fish as an antidote to poison. They are also consumed as a remedy for ovarian problems and gastro-intestinal disorders. A decoction of the dried leaves is used to treat diarrhoea and the leaves are pulped to promote the healing of wounds. The dried leaves and fibrous root scrapings are used as a substitute for tobacco. The powdered rootbark is highly prized in traditional medicine as a stimulating intoxicant and aphrodisiac.

This plant is preferentially used by chimpanzees in making tools for catching termites in the Dja Faunal Reserve in south eastern Cameroon. The animals hunt through the forest for the shrub and make short poles out of it. Thicker poles about half a metre long are used to dig into and disturb the termite mound, and thinner, flexible poles are inserted for the angry termites to climb onto. The chimpanzees then scoop the termites clinging to their fishing rods into their mouths.

== Phytochemicals ==
Compounds contained in Alchornea floribunda include Alchorneine, Alchorneinone, Alkaloids, Anthranilic acid, Gentisinic acid, Isoalchorneine and Yohimbine.

== See also ==
- Psychedelic plants
