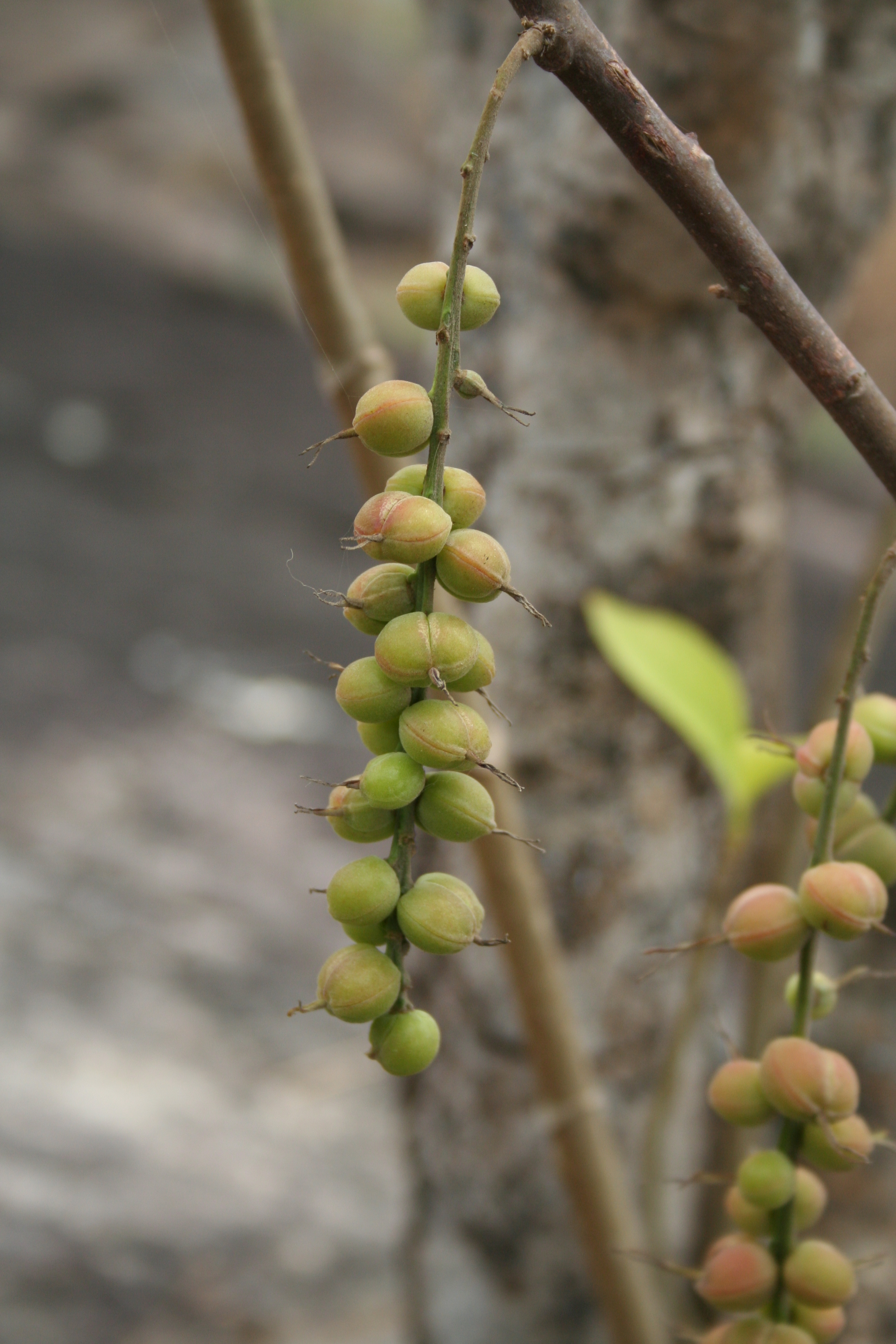

Conservation status
- Least Concern (IUCN 3.1)

Scientific classification
- Kingdom: Plantae
- Clade: Tracheophytes
- Clade: Angiosperms
- Clade: Eudicots
- Clade: Rosids
- Order: Malpighiales
- Family: Euphorbiaceae
- Genus: Alchornea
- Species: A. cordifolia

Binomial name
- Alchornea cordifolia Müll.Arg.

Synonyms
- Schousboea cordifolia Alchornea cordata

= Alchornea cordifolia =

Species of flowering plant

Alchornea cordifolia is a shrub or small tree distributed throughout tropical Africa, it can grow up to 8 metres tall. The plant is used in traditional African medicine. Common name is the Christmas bush.

== Chemical constituents ==
The leaves, roots and stem bark contain terpenoids, steroid glycosides, flavonoids, tannins, saponins, carbohydrates and the imidazopyrimidine alkaloids alchorneine, alchornidine, and several guanidine alkaloids. The leaves also contain a range of hydroxybenzoic acids: gallic acid and its ethyl ester, gentisic acid, anthranilic acid, protocatechuic acid, and ellagic acid (alizarine yellow). A C20 homolog of vernolic acid named alchornoic acid can be found in the seed oil.

== Uses ==
The plant is cultivated for its medicinal purposes in the Democratic Republic of Congo. It supplies dye and wood, and in other occasions it is widely used for food. Its dried leaves are substituted for tea. The roots of the plant are used to treat venereal diseases, amoebic dysentery and diarrhoea. It is used to make drops to cure eye diseases like conjunctivitis.
