= Orfilea =

Scientific classification
- Kingdom: Plantae
- Clade: Tracheophytes
- Clade: Angiosperms
- Clade: Eudicots
- Clade: Rosids
- Order: Malpighiales
- Family: Euphorbiaceae
- Subfamily: Acalyphoideae
- Tribe: Alchorneae
- Subtribe: Alchorneinae
- Genus: Orfilea; Baill.

Synonyms
- Diderotia Baill.; Lautembergia Baill.

Genus of flowering plants

Orfilea is a plant genus of the family Euphorbiaceae first described as a genus in 1858. It is native to Madagascar and other islands in the Indian Ocean.

Species

1. Orfilea ankafinensis (Baill.) Radcl.-Sm. & Govaerts - W Madagascar
2. Orfilea coriacea Baill. - Comoros, Madagascar
3. Orfilea multispicata (Baill.) G.L.Webster - Madagascar
4. Orfilea neraudiana (Baill.) G.L.Webster - Mauritius
