= Alchornea hirtella =

Scientific classification
- Kingdom: Plantae
- Clade: Tracheophytes
- Clade: Angiosperms
- Clade: Eudicots
- Clade: Rosids
- Order: Malpighiales
- Family: Euphorbiaceae
- Genus: Alchornea
- Species: A. hirtella

Binomial name
- Alchornea hirtella Benth.

Species of flowering plant

Alchornea hirtella is a shrub or small tree in the genus Alchornea in the family Euphorbiaceae. It is native to tropical Central and Southern Africa.

== Description ==
Alchornea hirtella is a straggly climber, a spindly shrub or a small tree that can grow to a height of about 9 metres (30 ft).

== Distribution and habitat ==
Alchornea hirtella is native to Central and Southern Africa. Its range extends from Senegal, Uganda and Kenya, southwards to Angola, Zambia, Mozambique and South Africa. It grows, sometimes in profusion, as an understorey shrub in tropical rain forest and in secondary forest, in riverine corridors and in the splash zone around waterfalls. It can grow at altitudes of up to 2,500 metres (8,200 ft).

== Uses ==
Stakes made of Alchornea hirtella wood easily root and are used for bean poles. Branches are split for use in basketry and the wood is sometimes used in construction and as firewood.

Extracts from the leaves of A. hirtella possess antimicrobial properties and have been found to inhibit growth of Proteus vulgaris, a pathogenic bacterium. The plant also has traditional herbal uses; various parts are used to treat toothache, diarrhoea, stomach ache, worms, headache, pain and the after effects of intoxication.

This plant is preferentially used by chimpanzees in making tools for catching ants. The animals hunt through the forest for the shrub and make short poles out of it. Thicker poles are used to dig into and disturb an ant nest and thinner, flexible poles are inserted for the angry ants to climb onto. The chimpanzees then run their hands along the poles, scooping off the ants and thrusting handfuls into their mouths.
