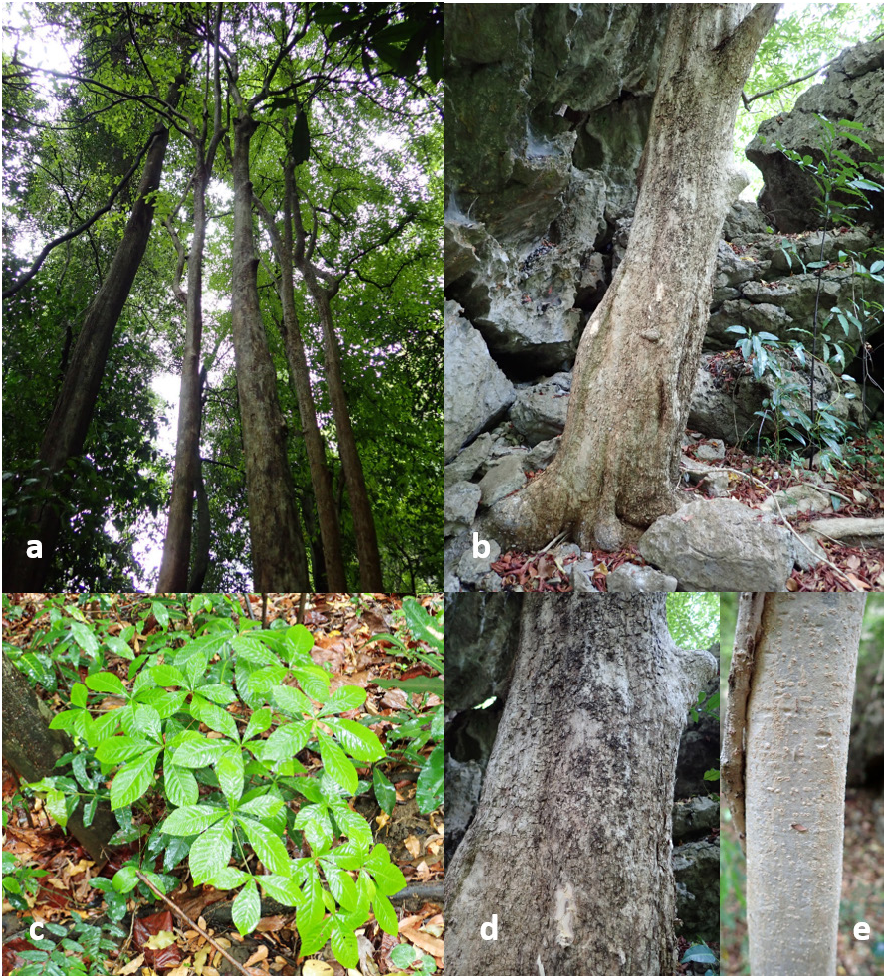
- Field photos: stand of P. andrafiabensis; old trunk; seedlings; old trunk closeup; young trunk

Conservation status
- Critically Endangered (IUCN 3.1)

Scientific classification
- Kingdom: Plantae
- Clade: Embryophytes
- Clade: Tracheophytes
- Clade: Spermatophytes
- Clade: Angiosperms
- Clade: Eudicots
- Clade: Rosids
- Order: Malpighiales
- Family: Euphorbiaceae
- Genus: Paranecepsia
- Species: P. andrafiabensis

Binomial name
- Paranecepsia andrafiabensis Barberá & O.Lachenaud

= Paranecepsia andrafiabensis =

Species of flowering plant

Paranecepsia andrafiabensis is a tree in the family Euphorbiaceae. It is a critically endangered species, endemic to Madagascar.

== Description ==
Paranecepsia andrafiabensis grows up to 15 m (50 ft) tall, with a trunk diameter of up to 40 cm (16 in). The bark begins smooth, becoming scaly with age. The leaves are oblanceolate to elliptic and measure up to 15.5 cm (6 in) long. The flowers are green to yellow.

== Taxonomy ==
Paranecepsia andrafiabensis was described by Spanish botanist Patricia Barberá and French botanist Olivier Lachenaud in the European Journal of Taxonomy in 2022. The type specimen was collected in Diana Region. The species is named for the village of Andrafiabe in Diana Region.

== Distribution and habitat ==
Paranecepsia andrafiabensis is endemic to northwestern Madagascar, where it is confined to the boundaries of Ankarana Special Reserve in Diana Region. Its habitat is in deciduous forest on limestone karst, at elevations of 37–72 m (121–236 ft).

== Conservation ==
Paranecepsia andrafiabensis has been assessed as critically endangered on the IUCN Red List. Although the species is partly in a protected area, Ankarana Special Reserve, it is threatened by fires that are set for animal grazing.
