= Cheiloseae =

Scientific classification
- Kingdom: Plantae
- Clade: Tracheophytes
- Clade: Angiosperms
- Clade: Eudicots
- Clade: Rosids
- Order: Malpighiales
- Family: Euphorbiaceae
- Subfamily: Acalyphoideae
- Tribe: Cheiloseae

Genera
- Cheilosa; Neoscortechinia

Tribe of flowering plants

Cheiloseae is a tribe of plant of the family Euphorbiaceae. It comprises 2 genera.

== See also ==
- Taxonomy of the Euphorbiaceae
