= Discocleidion =

Conservation status
- Least Concern (IUCN 3.1)

Scientific classification
- Kingdom: Plantae
- Clade: Tracheophytes
- Clade: Angiosperms
- Clade: Eudicots
- Clade: Rosids
- Order: Malpighiales
- Family: Euphorbiaceae
- Subfamily: Acalyphoideae
- Tribe: Bernardieae
- Genus: Discocleidion; Pax & K.Hoffm.
- Species: D. rufescens

Binomial name
- Discocleidion rufescens (Franch.) Pax & K.Hoffm.

Synonyms
- Cleidion sect. Discocleidion Müll. Arg.; Alchornea rufescens Franch.; Wetria rufescens (Franch.) Pamp.; Acalypha giraldii Pax ex Diels; Mallotus cavaleriei H.Lév.

Genus of flowering plants

Discocleidion is a genus of plants in the family Euphorbiaceae. It was first described as a genus in 1914. It contains one accepted species, Discocleidion rufescens, endemic to China.

formerly included

moved to Alchornea

1. Discocleidion glabrum Merr., synonym of Alchornea glabra (Merr.) Hurus.
2. Discocleidion ulmifolium (Müll.Arg.) Pax & K.Hoffm., synonym of Alchornea ulmifolia (Müll.Arg.) Hurus.
