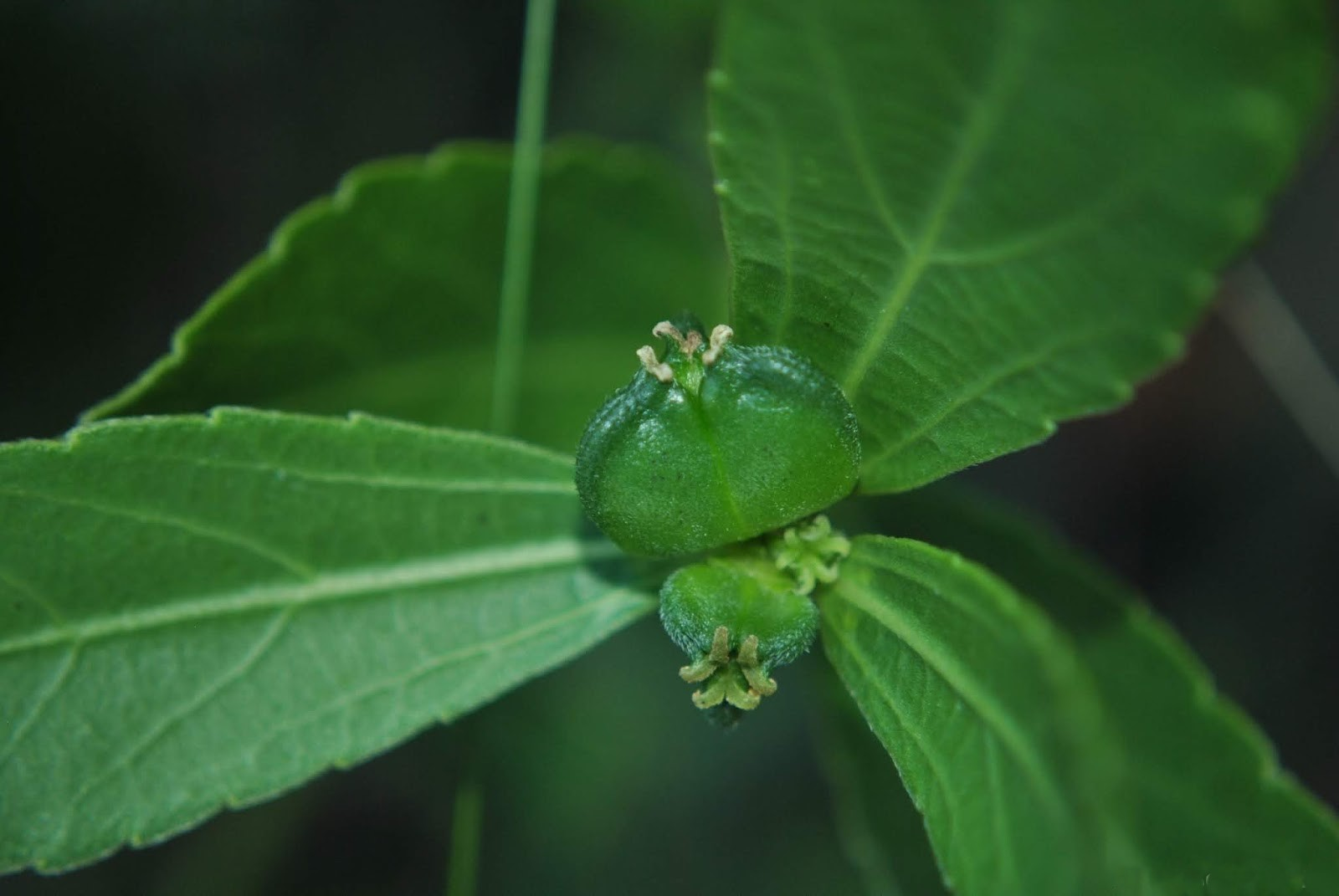
- Bernardia sellowi

Scientific classification
- Kingdom: Plantae
- Clade: Tracheophytes
- Clade: Angiosperms
- Clade: Eudicots
- Clade: Rosids
- Order: Malpighiales
- Family: Euphorbiaceae
- Subfamily: Acalyphoideae
- Tribe: Bernardieae; G.L.Webster

Genera
- Adenophaedra; Amyrea; Bernardia; Discocleidion; Necepsia; Paranecepsia

= Bernardieae =

Tribe of flowering plants

The Bernardieae is a tribe of the subfamily Acalyphoideae, under the family Euphorbiaceae. It comprises 6 genera.

== See also ==
- Taxonomy of the Euphorbiaceae
