= Neoscortechinia =

Scientific classification
- Kingdom: Plantae
- Clade: Tracheophytes
- Clade: Angiosperms
- Clade: Eudicots
- Clade: Rosids
- Order: Malpighiales
- Family: Euphorbiaceae
- Tribe: Cheiloseae
- Genus: Neoscortechinia; Hook.f. ex Pax

Type species
- Alcinaeanthus philippinensis Merr.

Synonyms
- Alcinaeanthus Merr.; Scortechinia Hook.f. 1887, illegitimate homonym, not Sacc. 1885 (a fungus)

Genus of flowering plants

Neoscortechinia is a plant genus of the family Euphorbiaceae first described as a genus in 1897. It is native to Southeast Asia and Papuasia.

Species

1. Neoscortechinia angustifolia (Airy Shaw) Welzen - Sabah, Kalimantan
2. Neoscortechinia forbesii (Hook.f.) S.Moore - New Guinea, Admiralty Islands, Bismarck Archipelago, Solomon Islands
3. Neoscortechinia kingii (Hook.f.) Pax & K.Hoffm. - W Malaysia, Sumatra, Borneo
4. Neoscortechinia nicobarica (Hook.f.) Pax & K.Hoffm. - Nicobar Islands, Myanmar, Malaysia, Indonesia, Philippines, W New Guinea
5. Neoscortechinia philippinensis (Merr.) Welzen - Myanmar, Thailand, Malaysia, W Indonesia, Philippines
6. Neoscortechinia sumatrensis S.Moore - W Malaysia, N. Sumatra, Simeuluë, Borneo
