= Alchorneine =

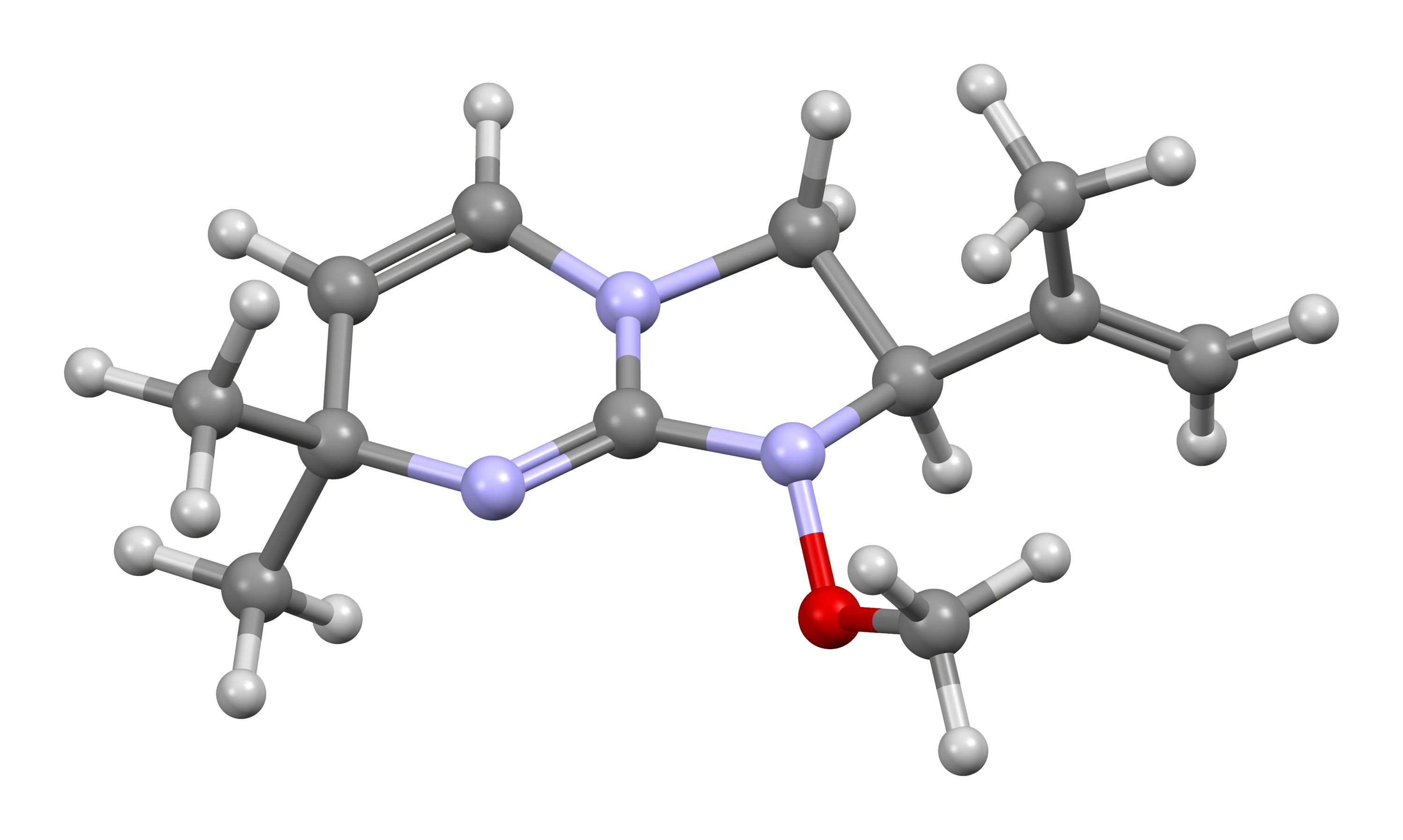

Names
- Preferred IUPAC name (2R)-1-Methoxy-7,7-dimethyl-2-(prop-1-en-2-yl)-1,2,3,7-tetrahydroimidazo[1,2-a]pyrimidine

Identifiers
CAS Number	28340-21-8
3D model (JSmol)	Interactive image
ChemSpider	3683166
PubChem CID	217611
UNII	EZ8Q3SE26S
CompTox Dashboard (EPA)	DTXSID50276915
- InChI: InChI=1S/C12H19N3O/c1-9(2)10-8-14-7-6-12(3,4)13-11(14)15(10)16-5/h6-7,10H,1,8H2,2-5H3 Key: RCNXAKUMTKVCLL-UHFFFAOYSA-N; InChI=1/C12H19N3O/c1-9(2)10-8-14-7-6-12(3,4)13-11(14)15(10)16-5/h6-7,10H,1,8H2,2-5H3 Key: RCNXAKUMTKVCLL-UHFFFAOYAY
- SMILES: CC(=C)C1CN2C=CC(N=C2N1OC)(C)C

Properties
Chemical formula	C_{12}H_{19}N_{3}O
Molar mass	221.304 g·mol^{−1}
- Except where otherwise noted, data are given for materials in their standard state (at 25 °C [77 °F], 100 kPa). Infobox references

Alchorneine is an imidazopyrimidine alkaloid found in trees in the genus Alchornea such as Alchornea castaneifolia, Alchornea floribunda or Alchornea cordifolia. This alkaloid causes certain nerve cells to be paralyzed, which has potential use as a purgative or pain reliever. It is used to create a tonic in traditional Western African medicine.
