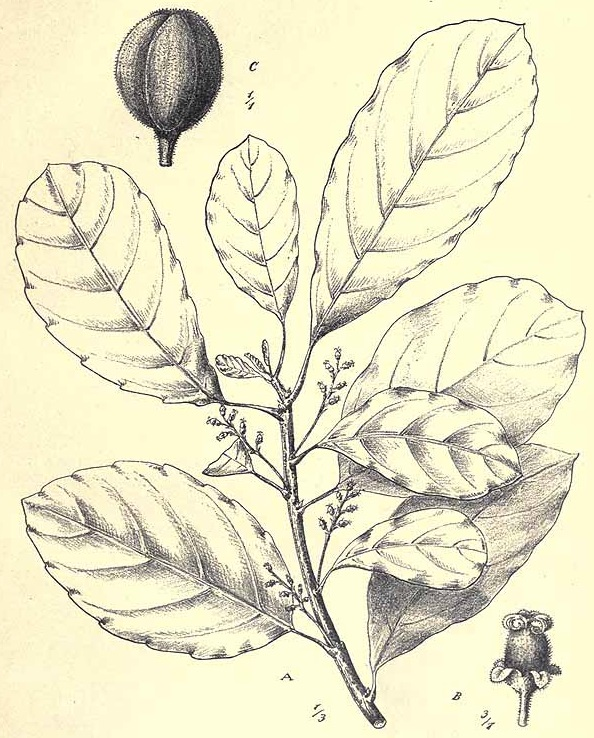
- Cheilosa montana, as drawn by H.G.A. Engler, printed in Das Pflanzenreich, 147 (52): 13, fig. 3 (1912)

Scientific classification
- Kingdom: Plantae
- Clade: Tracheophytes
- Clade: Angiosperms
- Clade: Eudicots
- Clade: Rosids
- Order: Malpighiales
- Family: Euphorbiaceae
- Tribe: Cheiloseae
- Genus: Cheilosa; Blume
- Species: C. montana

Binomial name
- Cheilosa montana Blume

Synonyms
- Baliospermum malayanum Hook.f.; Baliospermum analayanum Hook.f. ex B.D.Jacks.; Cheilosa homaliifolia Merr.; Scortechinia malayana (Hook.f.) Ridl.; Cheilosa malayana (Hook.f.) Corner ex Airy Shaw

= Cheilosa =

Genus of flowering plants

Cheilosa is a monotypic plant genus of the family Euphorbiaceae first described as a genus in 1826. Only one species is recognized: Cheilosa montana, native to Southeast Asia (Peninsular Malaysia, Borneo, Sumatra, Philippines, Java).

formerly included

moved to Trigonostemon

- Cheilosa whiteana Croizat, synonym of Trigonostemon whiteanus (Croizat) Airy Shaw
