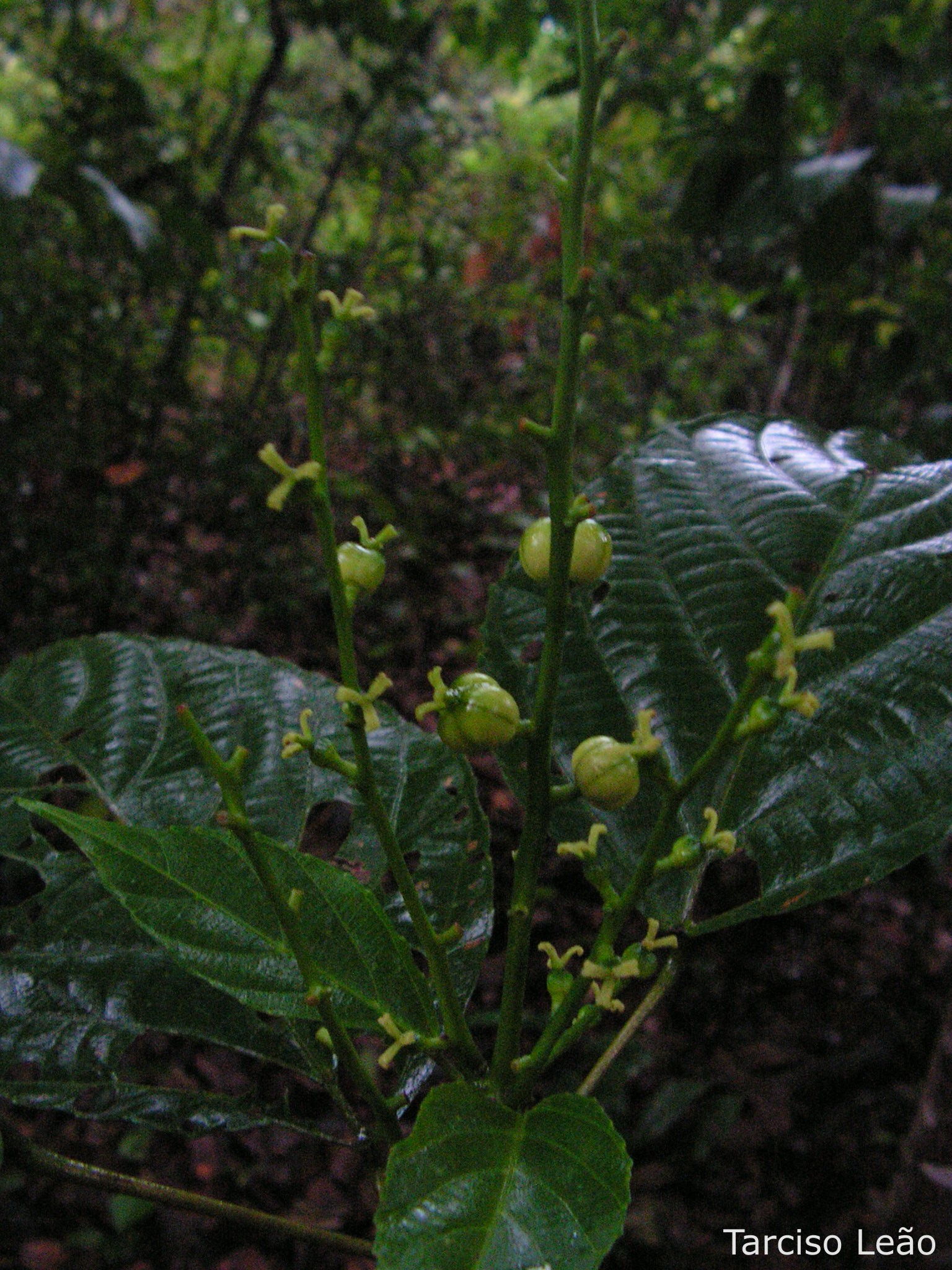
- Aparisthmium cordatum in Brazil

Conservation status
- Least Concern (IUCN 3.1)

Scientific classification
- Kingdom: Plantae
- Clade: Tracheophytes
- Clade: Angiosperms
- Clade: Eudicots
- Clade: Rosids
- Order: Malpighiales
- Family: Euphorbiaceae
- Subfamily: Acalyphoideae
- Tribe: Alchorneae
- Subtribe: Alchorneinae
- Genus: Aparisthmium; Endl.
- Species: A. cordatum

Binomial name
- Aparisthmium cordatum (A.Juss.) Baill.

Synonyms
- Conceveiba cordata A.Juss.; Alchornea cordata (A.Juss.) Müll.Arg.; Alchornea macrophylla Mart.; Alchornea latifolia Klotzsch; Conceveiba macropylla (Mart.) Klotzsch ex Benth.; Aparisthmium macrophyllum (Mart.) Baill.; Aparisthmium spruceanum Baill.; Conceveiba poeppigiana Klotzsch ex Pax & K.Hoffm.; Alchornea orinocensis Croizat

= Aparisthmium =

Genus of trees

Aparisthmium is a plant genus of the family Euphorbiaceae first described as a genus in 1840. It contains only one known species, Aparisthmium cordatum, native to South America and Costa Rica.
