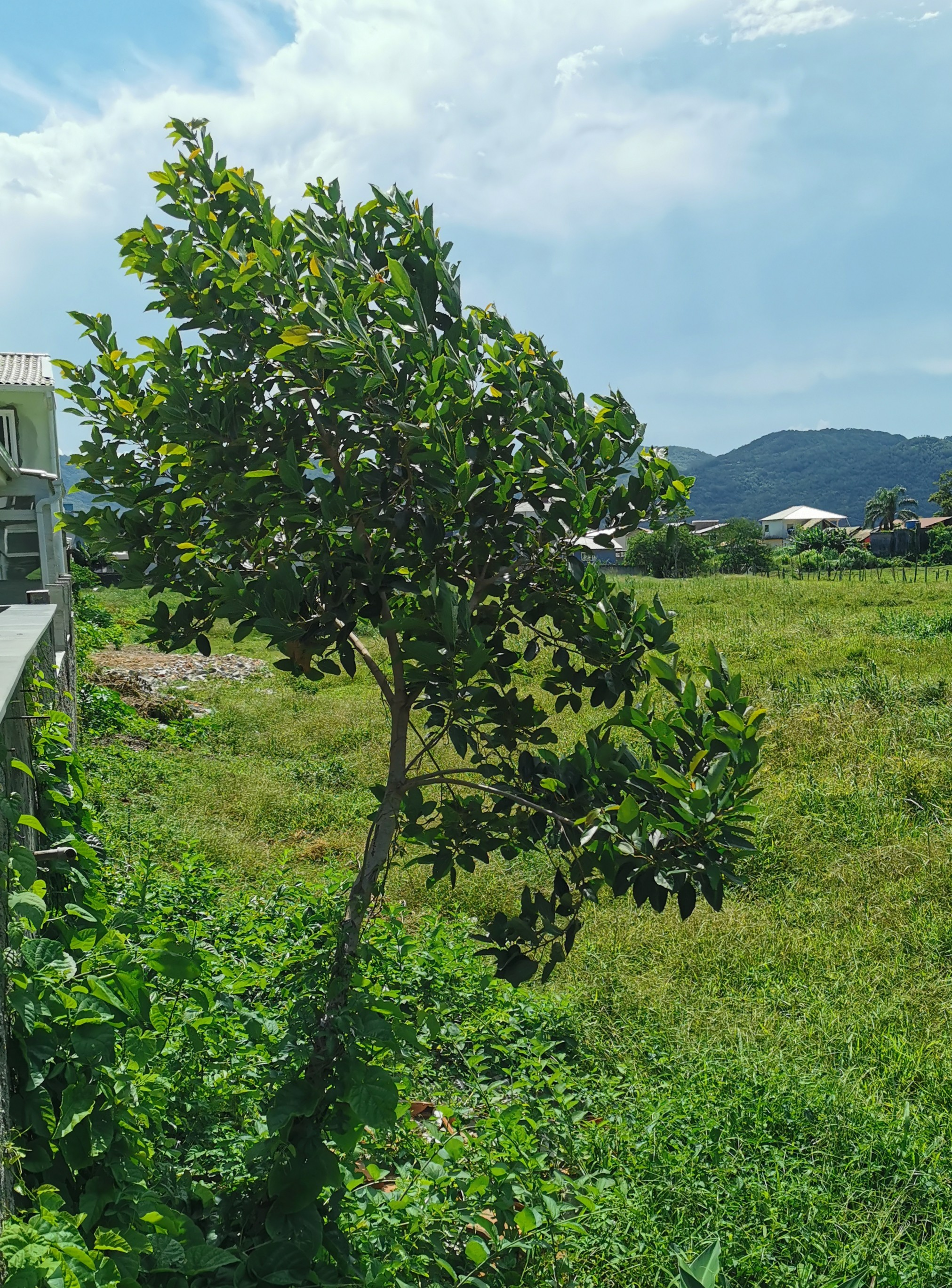

Scientific classification
- Kingdom: Plantae
- Clade: Tracheophytes
- Clade: Angiosperms
- Clade: Eudicots
- Clade: Rosids
- Order: Malpighiales
- Family: Euphorbiaceae
- Genus: Alchornea
- Species: A. triplinervia

Binomial name
- Alchornea triplinervia (Spreng.) Müll.Arg.

Synonyms
- Alchornea janeirensis Casar.; Alchornea nemoralis Mart.; Antidesma triplinervium Spreng.

= Alchornea triplinervia =

Species of tree

Alchornea triplinervia is a commercial timber tree native to the Amazon rainforest, Atlantic Forest, and Cerrado vegetation in Brazil. This plant is found in the following states of Brazil: Amazonas, Bahia, Espírito Santo, Goiás, Mato Grosso, Mato Grosso do Sul, Minas Gerais, Paraná, Rio de Janeiro, Rio Grande do Sul, Rondônia, Roraima, Santa Catarina, and São Paulo. It is also used as a honey plant.
