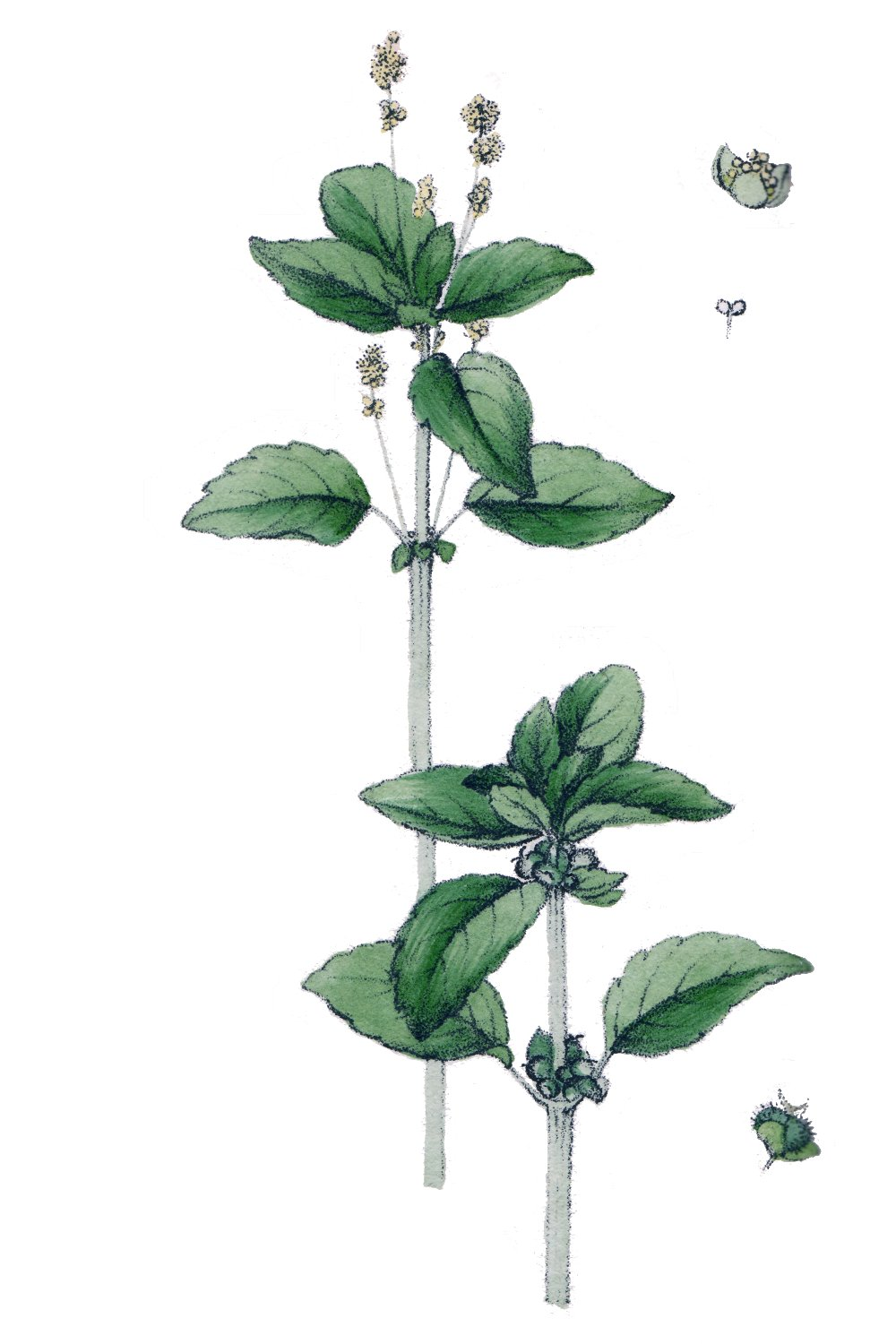
- Annual mercury (Mercurialis annua)

Scientific classification
- Kingdom: Plantae
- Clade: Tracheophytes
- Clade: Angiosperms
- Clade: Eudicots
- Clade: Rosids
- Order: Malpighiales
- Family: Euphorbiaceae
- Subfamily: Acalyphoideae; Beilschm.

Tribes
- Acalypheae; Adelieae; Agrostistachydeae; Alchorneae; Ampereae; Bernardieae; Caryodendreae; Chaetocarpeae; Cheiloseae; Chrozophoreae; Clutieae; Dicoelieae; Epiprineae; Erismantheae; Galearieae; Omphaleae; Pereae; Plukenetieae; Pogonophoreae; Pycnocomeae; Sphyranthereae

= Acalyphoideae =

Acalyphoideae Temporal range: Maastrichtian - recent

Subfamily of plants

The Acalyphoideae are a subfamily within the family Euphorbiaceae with 116 genera in 20 tribes.

== See also ==
- Taxonomy of the Euphorbiaceae
