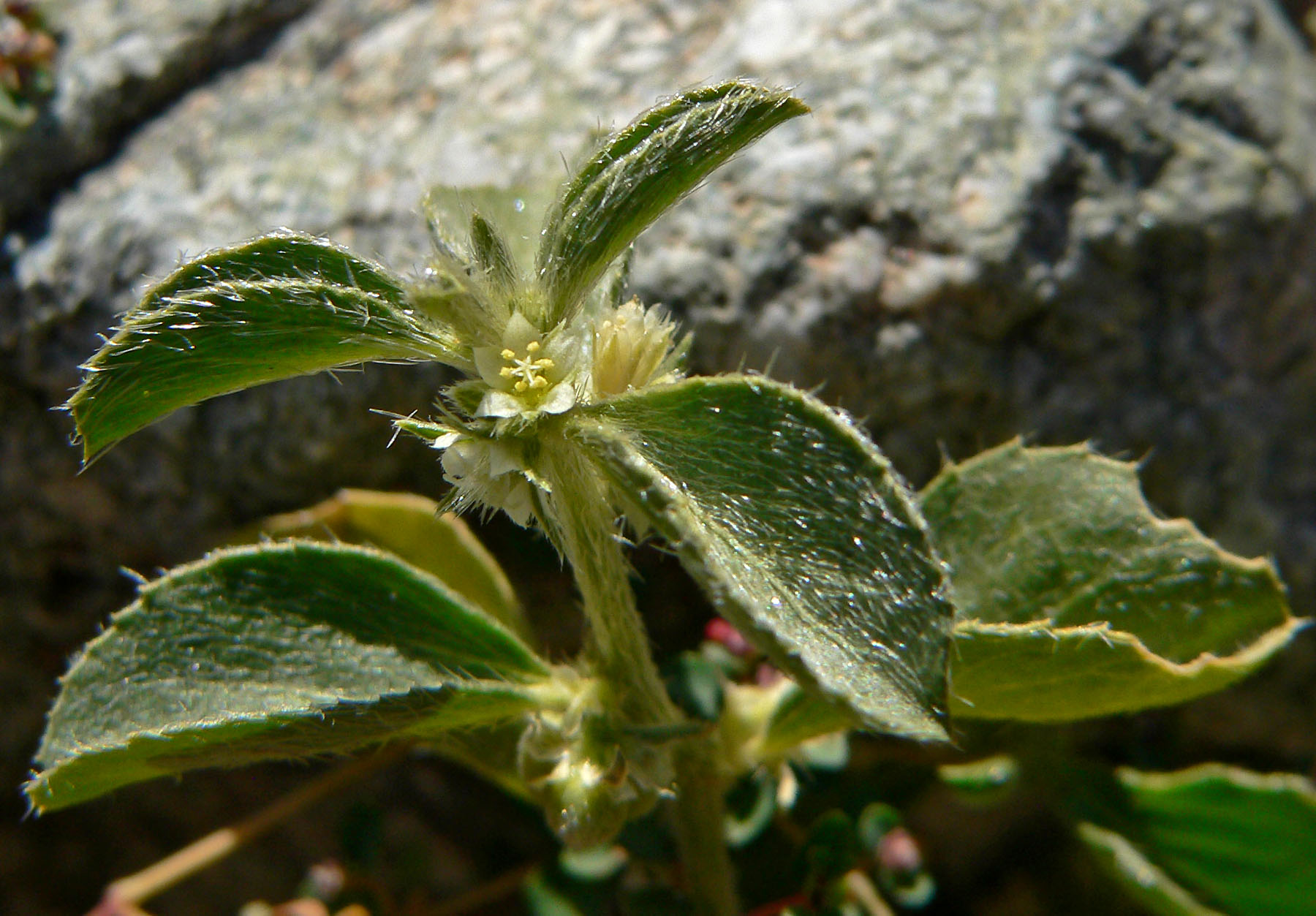
- Argythamnia serrata

Scientific classification
- Kingdom: Plantae
- Clade: Tracheophytes
- Clade: Angiosperms
- Clade: Eudicots
- Clade: Rosids
- Order: Malpighiales
- Family: Euphorbiaceae
- Subfamily: Acalyphoideae
- Tribe: Chrozophoreae
- Subtribe: Ditaxinae
- Genus: Argythamnia; P.Browne

Synonyms
- Argithamnia Sw. spelling variation; Argothamnia Spreng. spelling variation; Argyrothamnia Müll.Arg. spelling variation; Argytamnia Duchesne spelling variation; Aphora Nutt.; Ditaxis Vahl ex A.Juss.; Odotalon Raf.; Paxia Herter; Paxiuscula Herter; Serophyton Benth.; Stenonia Didr.

= Argythamnia =

Silverbushes

Genus of flowering plants

Argythamnia is a genus of flowering plants of the family Euphorbiaceae. They are known commonly as silverbushes. The genus includes 66 species native to the Americas, ranging from the southwestern and south-central United States through Mexico, Central America, the Caribbean, and South America to southern Argentina.

The genus was described by Patrick Browne in 1756.

== Species ==
66 species are accepted as of May 2026. There have been many changes in classification the past several years.

- Argythamnia acaulis (Herter) J.W.Ingram
- Argythamnia acutangula Croizat – Colombia
- Argythamnia adenophora A.Gray
- Argythamnia alcalina J.Külkamp
- Argythamnia aphoroides Müll.Arg.
- Argythamnia argentea Millsp. – South Caicos
- Argythamnia argothamnoides (Bertol. ex Spreng.) J.W.Ingram
- Argythamnia argyaea Cory – Texas
- Argythamnia arlynniana J.W.Ingram
- Argythamnia brandegeei Millsp.
- Argythamnia breviramea Müll.Arg.
- Argythamnia calycina Müll.Arg.
- Argythamnia candicans Sw. – West Indies
- Argythamnia claryana Jeps.
- Argythamnia coatepensis (Brandegee) Croizat – Veracruz and Puebla
- Argythamnia cubensis Britton & P.Wilson – Cuba
- Argythamnia cuneifolia (Pax & K.Hoffm.) J.W.Ingram
- Argythamnia cyanophylla (Wooton & Standl.) J.W.Ingram
- Argythamnia depressa (Greenm.) J.W.Ingram
- Argythamnia desertorum Müll.Arg.
- Argythamnia dioica (Kunth) Müll.Arg.
- Argythamnia ecdyomena J.W.Ingram – Alta Verapaz
- Argythamnia erubescens J.R.Johnst.
- Argythamnia estacionalis M.M.Ornelas & J.Külkamp
- Argythamnia fasciculata (Vahl ex A.Juss.) Müll.Arg.
- Argythamnia grazielae (J.Külkamp) J.Külkamp & Riina
- Argythamnia guatemalensis Müll.Arg.
- Argythamnia haitiensis (Urb.) J.W.Ingram
- Argythamnia haplostigma Pax & K.Hoffm. – Roatán
- Argythamnia heterantha (Zucc.) Müll.Arg.
- Argythamnia heteropilosa J.W.Ingram – Cuba
- Argythamnia humilis (Engelm. & A.Gray) Müll.Arg.
- Argythamnia illimaniensis Müll.Arg.
- Argythamnia ingramii Ram.-Amezcua & V.W.Steinm.
- Argythamnia jablonszkyana (Pax & K.Hoffm.) J.W.Ingram
- Argythamnia katharinae (Pax) Croizat
- Argythamnia lanceolata (Benth.) Müll.Arg.
- Argythamnia lottiae J.W.Ingram – Jalisco
- Argythamnia lucayana Millsp. – Bahamas, Turks & Caicos
- Argythamnia lundellii J.W.Ingram – Yucatán Peninsula
- Argythamnia macrantha (Pax & K.Hoffm.) Croizat
- Argythamnia macrobotrys (Pax & K.Hoffm.) J.W.Ingram
- Argythamnia malpighiacea Ule
- Argythamnia malpighipila (Hicken) J.W.Ingram
- Argythamnia manzanilloana Rose
- Argythamnia mercurialina (Nutt.) Müll.Arg.
- Argythamnia microphylla Pax – Camagüey
- Argythamnia montevidensis (Didr.) Müll.Arg.
- Argythamnia moorei J.W.Ingram – Guerrero
- Argythamnia oblongifolia Urb. – Hispaniola
- Argythamnia pilosissima (Benth.) Müll.Arg.
- Argythamnia polygama (Jacq.) Kuntze
- Argythamnia pringlei Greenm.
- Argythamnia proctorii J.W.Ingram – Grand Cayman
- Argythamnia purpurascens S.Moore
- Argythamnia salina (Pax & K.Hoffm.) J.W.Ingram
- Argythamnia sellowiana (Pax & K.Hoffm.) J.W.Ingram
- Argythamnia sericea Griseb. – Bahamas, Turks & Caicos
- Argythamnia serrata (Torr.) Müll.Arg.
- Argythamnia silviae Ram.-Amezcua & V.W.Steinm.
- Argythamnia simoniana (Casar.) Müll.Arg.
- Argythamnia simulans J.W.Ingram
- Argythamnia sitiens (Brandegee) J.W.Ingram – Veracruz
- Argythamnia stahlii Urb. – Puerto Rico, Virgin Islands
- Argythamnia tinctoria Millsp. – Veracruz, Yucatán, Guatemala, Honduras
- Argythamnia wheeleri J.W.Ingram – Yucatán

=== formerly placed here ===
Moved to other genera (Caperonia, Chiropetalum, Croton, Philyra, and Speranskia)

- A. acalyphifolia - Caperonia acalyphifolia
- A. aculeolata - Caperonia aculeolata
- A. angustissima - Caperonia angustissima
- A. anisotricha - Chiropetalum anisotrichum
- A. argentinensis - Chiropetalum argentinense
- A. astroplethos - Chiropetalum astroplethos
- A. bahiensis - Caperonia bahiensis
- A. berteroana - Chiropetalum berteroanum
- A. boliviensis - Chiropetalum boliviense
- A. brasiliensis - Philyra brasiliensis
- A. buettneriacea - Caperonia buettneriacea
- A. canescens - Chiropetalum canescens
- A. cantonensis - Speranskia cantonensis
- A. castaneifolia - Caperonia castaneifolia
- A. corchorodes - Caperonia corchoroides
- A. cordata - Caperonia cordata
- A. cremnophila - Chiropetalum cremnophilum
- A. foliosa - Chiropetalum foliosum
- A. grisea - Chiropetalum griseum
- A. gymnadenia - Chiropetalum gymnadenium
- A. herbacea - Croton monanthogynus
- A. heteropetala - Caperonia heteropetala
- A. heteropetalodes - Caperonia heteropetala
- A. hochstetteri - Caperonia serrata
- A. intermedia - Chiropetalum intermedium
- A. langsdorffii - Caperonia langsdorffii
- A. linearifolia - Caperonia linearifolia
- A. lineata - Chiropetalum tricoccum
- A. mollis - Chiropetalum molle
- A. muellerargoviana - Caperonia gardneri
- A. multicostata - Caperonia multicostata
- A. paludosa - Caperonia castaneifolia
- A. palustris - Caperonia palustris
- A. pavoniana - Chiropetalum pavonianum
- A. phalacradenia - Chiropetalum phalacradenium
- A. pilosistyla - Chiropetalum pilosistylum
- A. quinquecuspidata - Chiropetalum quinquecuspidatum
- A. ramboi - Chiropetalum ramboi
- A. regnellii - Caperonia regnellii
- A. ruiziana - Chiropetalum ruizianum
- A. rutenbergii - Caperonia rutenbergii
- A. schiedeana - Chiropetalum schiedeanum
- A. senegalensis - Caperonia serrata
- A. sponiella - Chiropetalum canescens
- A. stenophylla - Caperonia stenophylla
- A. triandra - Chiropetalum boliviense
- A. tricocca - Chiropetalum tricoccum
- A. tricuspidata - Chiropetalum tricuspidatum
- A. tuberculata - Speranskia tuberculata
