= Cephalocroton =

Scientific classification
- Kingdom: Plantae
- Clade: Tracheophytes
- Clade: Angiosperms
- Clade: Eudicots
- Clade: Rosids
- Order: Malpighiales
- Family: Euphorbiaceae
- Subfamily: Acalyphoideae
- Tribe: Epiprineae
- Subtribe: Epiprininae
- Genus: Cephalocroton; Hochst.

Type species
- Cephalocroton cordofanus Hochst.

Genus of flowering plants

Cephalocroton is a genus of plant of the family Euphorbiaceae first described as a genus in 1841. It is native to central, eastern, and southern Africa from Nigeria and Ethiopia south to KwaZulu-Natal.

Use

The dead wood of some species can be used as a fumigant.

Species

1. Cephalocroton cordofanus Hochst. - Nigeria, Sudan, South Sudan, Ethiopia, Somalia, Kenya, Tanzania
2. Cephalocroton incanus M.G.Gilbert - Nigeria, Ethiopia
3. Cephalocroton mollis Klotzsch - Tanzania, Mozambuque, Zimbabwe, Malawi, Botswana, Namibia, KwaZulu-Natal, Limpopo, Mpumalanga
4. Cephalocroton polygynus Pax & K.Hoffm. - Somalia

formerly included

moved to other genera (Adenochlaena Cephalocrotonopsis Cladogynos Epiprinus Sumbaviopsis )

1. C. albicans - Sumbaviopsis albicans
2. C. albicans var. virens - Cladogynos orientalis
3. C. cordifolius - Adenochlaena leucocephala
4. C. discolor - Cladogynos orientalis
5. C. indicus - Epiprinus mallotiformis
6. C. leucocephalus - Adenochlaena leucocephala
7. C. orientalis - Cladogynos orientalis
8. C. socotranus - Cephalocrotonopsis socotranus
9. C. zeylanicus - Adenochlaena zeylanica
