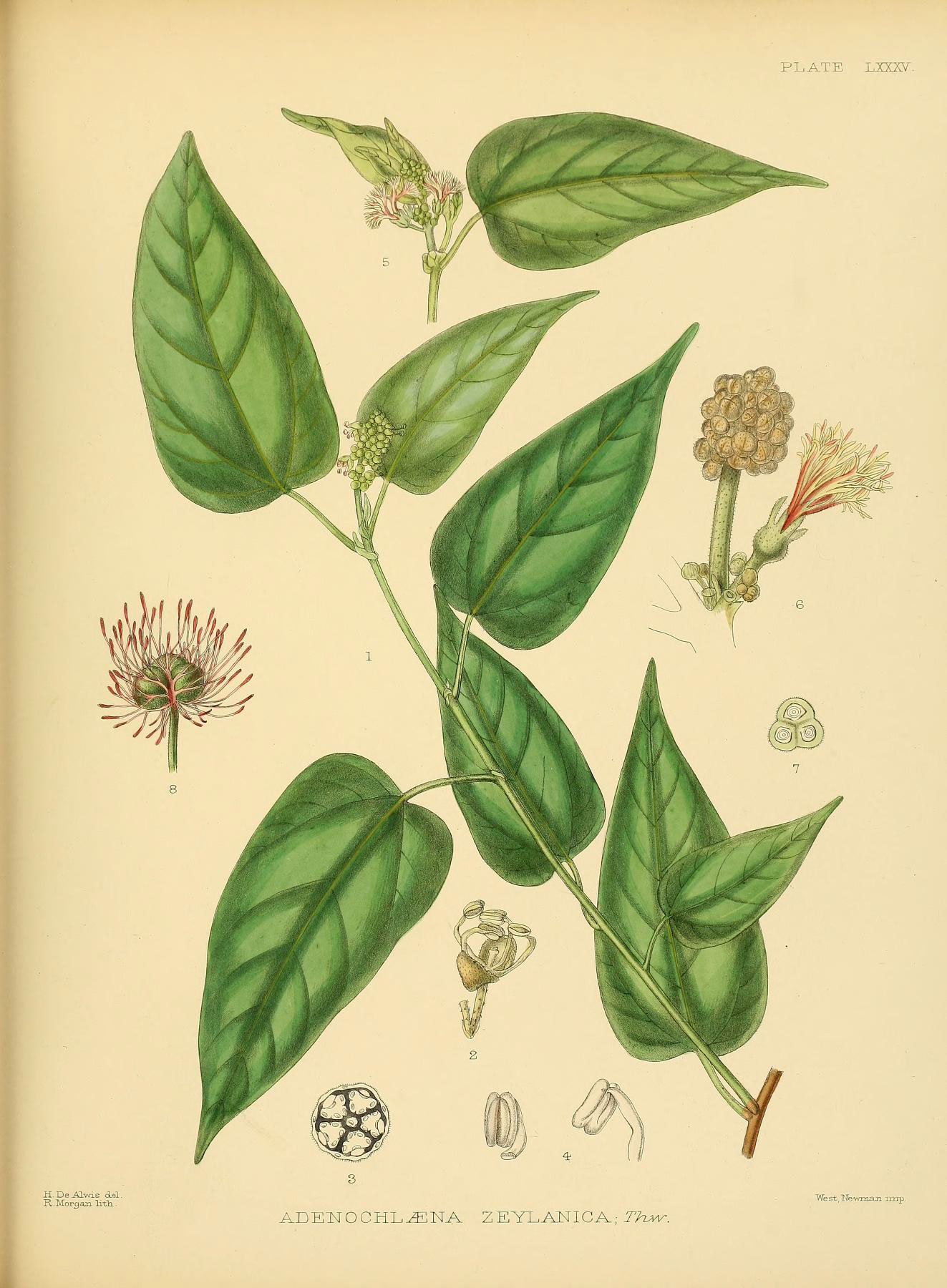
- Adenochlaena zeylanica

Scientific classification
- Kingdom: Plantae
- Clade: Tracheophytes
- Clade: Angiosperms
- Clade: Eudicots
- Clade: Rosids
- Order: Malpighiales
- Family: Euphorbiaceae
- Subfamily: Acalyphoideae
- Tribe: Epiprineae
- Subtribe: Epiprininae
- Genus: Adenochlaena; Boivin ex Baill.

Type species
- Adenochlaena leucocephala Baill.

Synonyms
- Centrostylis Baill. Niedenzua Pax

= Adenochlaena =

Genus of flowering plants

Adenochlaena is a genus of plant of the family Euphorbiaceae first described as a genus in 1858. It is native to certain islands in the Indian Ocean.

Species

1. Adenochlaena leucocephala Baill. - Madagascar, Comoros
2. Adenochlaena zeylanica (Baill.) Thwaites - Sri Lanka

formerly included

moved to other genera (Cladogynos Epiprinus Koilodepas )

- A. calycina - Koilodepas calycinum
- A. indica - Epiprinus mallotiformis
- A. mallotiformis - Epiprinus mallotiformis
- A. siamensis - Cladogynos orientalis
- A. siletensis - Epiprinus siletianus
