= Tournesol =

Tournesol may refer to:

- Sunflower
- Chrozophora
- Professor Calculus (French: Professeur Tryphon Tournesol), a fictional character of The Adventures of Tintin
- Tournesol (satellite), a satellite launched in 1971
- Tournesols (Van Gogh series)

== See also ==
- Turnsole
