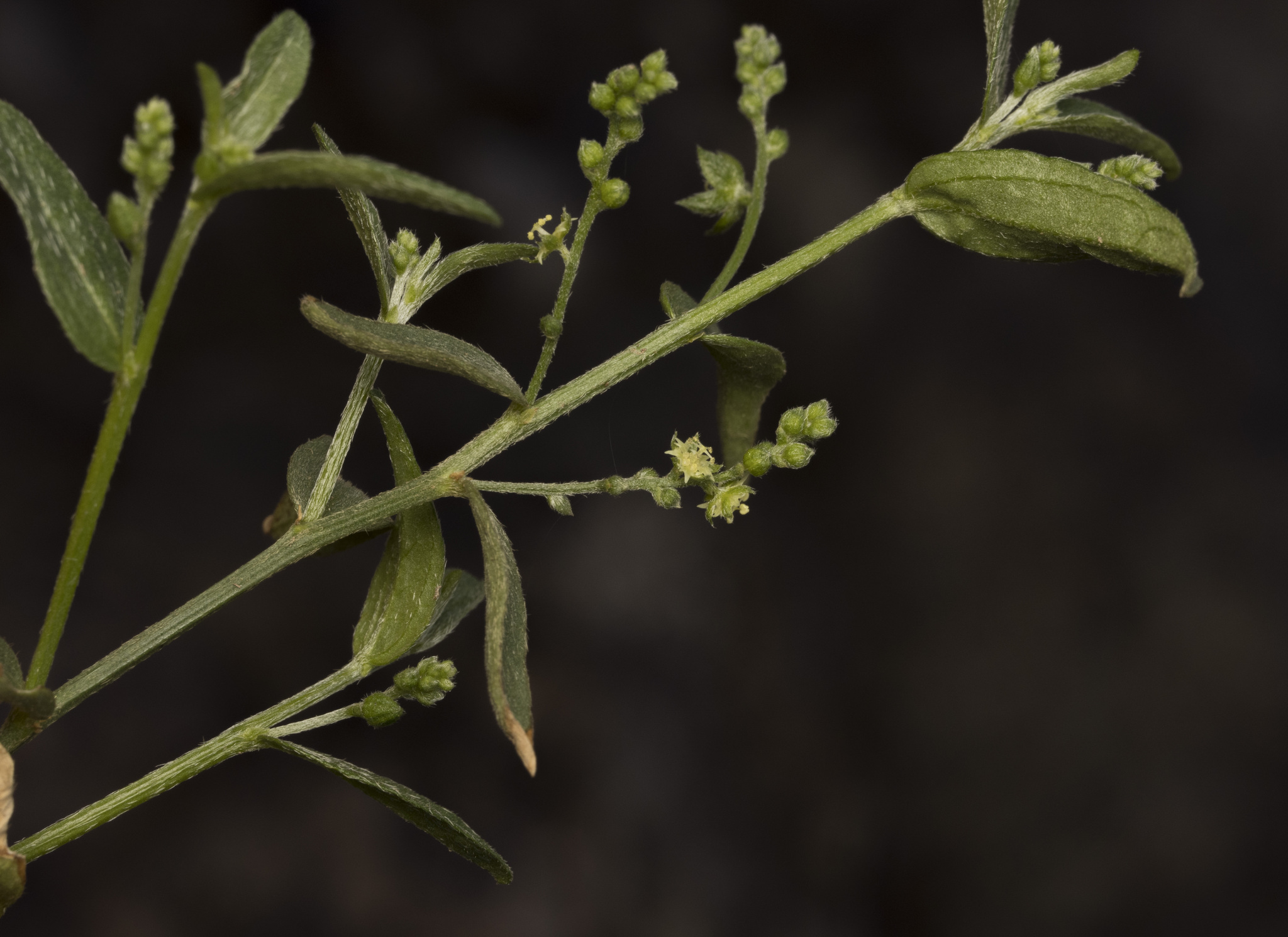

Scientific classification
- Kingdom: Plantae
- Clade: Tracheophytes
- Clade: Angiosperms
- Clade: Eudicots
- Clade: Rosids
- Order: Malpighiales
- Family: Euphorbiaceae
- Genus: Chiropetalum
- Species: C. berterianum

Binomial name
- Chiropetalum berterianum Schltdl.

= Chiropetalum berterianum =

Species of plant

Chiropetalum berterianum is a species of flowering plant in the family Euphorbiaceae. It is a sub-shrub endemic to Chile, where it is distributed from the Atacama to the Araucania regions. It is one of the four species in the genus Chiropetalum that are present in Chile, alongside Chiropetalum canescens, Chiropetalum cremnophilum and Chiropetalum tricuspidatum.
