= Philyra =

Philyra may refer to:

== Greek mythology ==
- Philyra (mythology), several figures in Greek mythology, including:
  - Philyra (Oceanid), an Oceanid nymph and mother by Cronus of Chiron
  - Philyra, one of the names given to the wife of Nauplius, who was the father of Palamedes
  - Philyra or Phillyra, daughter of the river Asopus, and the mother of Hypseus by Peneius

== Organisms ==
- Philyra (crustacean), a genus of decapod in family Leucosiidae
- Philyra (plant), a genus of flowering plant in the spurge family
- Philyra (EP), an EP by the Mountain Goats
