= Stenonia =

Stenonia may refer to:

- Stenonia (Cleistanthus) (Cleistanthus Hook.f. ex Planch. 1848; Stenonia Baill. 1858), a plant genus of the family Phyllanthaceae
- Ditaxis (Stenonia Didr. 1857), a plant genus of family Euphorbiaceae
- Stenonia (millipede) (Gray, 1843), a genus of millipedes in family Julidae

== See also ==
- Cleistanthus stenonia (Baill.) Jabl.
- Stenonia montevidensis Didr., syn of Ditaxis montevidensis (Didr.) Pax.
