= Cephalomappa sinensis =

Conservation status
- Vulnerable (IUCN 2.3)

Scientific classification
- Kingdom: Plantae
- Clade: Tracheophytes
- Clade: Angiosperms
- Clade: Eudicots
- Clade: Rosids
- Order: Malpighiales
- Family: Euphorbiaceae
- Subfamily: Acalyphoideae
- Tribe: Epiprineae
- Subtribe: Cephalomappinae
- Genus: Cephalomappa
- Species: C. sinensis

Binomial name
- Cephalomappa sinensis (Chun & F.C.How) Kosterm.

Synonyms
- Muricococcum sinense Chun & F.C.How

Genus of flowering plants

Cephalomappa sinensis is a species of flowering plant of the family Euphorbiaceae. It is a tree native to southern Yunnan and eastern and southeastern Guangxi in southern China and to northern Vietnam.

The IUCN Red List assesses the species as Vulnerable.

The species was first described as Muricococcum sinense in 1956, and placed in the monotypic genus Muricococcum. In 1961 André Joseph Guillaume Henri Kostermans placed the species in genus Cephalomappa as C. sinensis.
