= Adelia acidoton =

Adelia acidoton can refer to the following plant species:

- Adelia acidoton Blanco, a synonym of Doryxylon spinosum Zoll.
- Adelia acidoton L., a synonym of Flueggea acidoton (L.) G.L.Webster
