= Paxia =

Scientific classification
- Kingdom: Plantae
- Clade: Tracheophytes
- Clade: Angiosperms
- Clade: Eudicots
- Clade: Rosids
- Order: Oxalidales
- Family: Connaraceae
- Genus: Paxia; Gilg. 1891 not Herter 1931 (Euphorbiaceae) nor Ö.Nilsson 1966 (Montiaceae)

Genus of flowering plants

Paxia is a genus of plants in the family Connaraceae, first described in 1891. It is native to west-central Africa (Gabon and Nigeria).

Species

- Paxia calophylloides G. Schellenb. - Gabon
- Paxia liberosepala (Baker f.) Schellenb. ex Hutch. & Dalziel - Nigeria
- Paxia scandens Gilg - Gabon
- Paxia soyauxii (Gilg) Pierre ex G.Schellenb. - Gabon

formerly included

- P. calophylla - Rourea calophylla
- P. cinnabarina - Rourea myriantha
- P. myriantha - Rourea myriantha
- P. zenkeri - Rourea myriantha

Two illegitimate homonyms have been published using the same name, i.e.

1. Paxia Herter 1931, synonym of Ditaxis in Euphorbiaceae - endemic to South America

- Paxia acaulis (Herter ex Arechav.) Herter, synonym of Ditaxis acaulis Herter ex Arechav - S Brazil, Uruguay, NE Argentina. Paraguay
- Paxia rhizantha (Pax & K.Hoffm.) Herter, synonym of Ditaxis rhizantha Pax & K.Hoffm. - Uruguay
- Paxia rosularis (Pax & K.Hoffm.) Herter, synonym of Ditaxis rosularis Pax & K.Hoffm. - Paraguay, NW Argentina
- Paxia sellowiana (Pax & K.Hoffm.) Herter, synonym of Ditaxis sellowiana Pax & K.Hoffm. - S Brazil

2. Paxia Ö.Nilsson 1966, synonym of either Neopaxia or Claytonia (depending on source) in Montiaceae - endemic to Australia

- Paxia australasica (Hook.f.) Ö.Nilsson, synonym of Neopaxia australasica (Hook.f.) Ö.Nilsson or Claytonia australasica Hook.f.
