= Symphyllia =

Symphyllia is the generic name of two groups of organisms. It can refer to:

- Symphyllia, a synonym for a genus of corals, Lobophyllia
- Symphyllia (plant), a genus of plants in the family Euphorbiaceae
