= Argythamnia heterantha =

Scientific classification
- Kingdom: Plantae
- Clade: Tracheophytes
- Clade: Angiosperms
- Clade: Eudicots
- Clade: Rosids
- Order: Malpighiales
- Family: Euphorbiaceae
- Genus: Argythamnia
- Species: A. heterantha

Binomial name
- Argythamnia heterantha (Zucc.) Müll.Arg.

Synonyms
- Argythamnia argentea Brandegee; Ditaxis heterantha Zucc.

Species of flowering plant

Argythamnia heterantha is a member of the plant family Euphorbiaceae. It is a shrub native to northern, eastern, and southwestern Mexico.

Argythamnia heterantha has dull, dark brown seeds 3–5 mm in diameter that resemble allspice. The waxy, deep orange endosperm of the seed is used in Mexico (particularly Guanajuato) for coloring and flavoring food, such as menudo amarillo. It has an oil content of about 40% and a protein content of about 20%, as well as containing the apocarotenoids heterathin and ditaxin.

In Guanajuato, Mexico, where it is known as azafrán, azafrancillo, azafrán de bolita or saffron pellets, it grows wild and has several culinary uses, including as a substitute for saffron. Argythamnia heterantha is not related to true saffron (Crocus sativus) nor to safflower (Carthamus tinctorius), which also is used as a saffron substitute.
