= Cleidiocarpon =

Scientific classification
- Kingdom: Plantae
- Clade: Tracheophytes
- Clade: Angiosperms
- Clade: Eudicots
- Clade: Rosids
- Order: Malpighiales
- Family: Euphorbiaceae
- Subfamily: Acalyphoideae
- Tribe: Epiprineae
- Subtribe: Epiprininae
- Genus: Cleidiocarpon; Airy Shaw

Synonyms
- Sinopimelodendron Tsiang

Genus of flowering plants

Cleidiocarpon is a genus of plant of the family Euphorbiaceae first described as a genus in 1965. It is native to China and Indochina.

Species

1. Cleidiocarpon cavaleriei (H.Lév.) Airy Shaw - Yunnan, Guizhou, Guangxi, Vietnam
2. Cleidiocarpon laurinum Airy Shaw - Thailand, Myanmar
