= Thyrsanthera =

Scientific classification
- Kingdom: Plantae
- Clade: Tracheophytes
- Clade: Angiosperms
- Clade: Eudicots
- Clade: Rosids
- Order: Malpighiales
- Family: Euphorbiaceae
- Subfamily: Acalyphoideae
- Tribe: Chrozophoreae
- Subtribe: Doryxylinae
- Genus: Thyrsanthera; Pierre ex Gagnep.
- Species: T. suborbicularis

Binomial name
- Thyrsanthera suborbicularis Pierre ex Gagnep.

Genus of flowering plants

Thyrsanthera is a genus of plants in the Euphorbiaceae first described as a genus in 1925. It contains only one known species, Thyrsanthera suborbicularis, native to Thailand, Cambodia, Vietnam, and possibly Laos.
