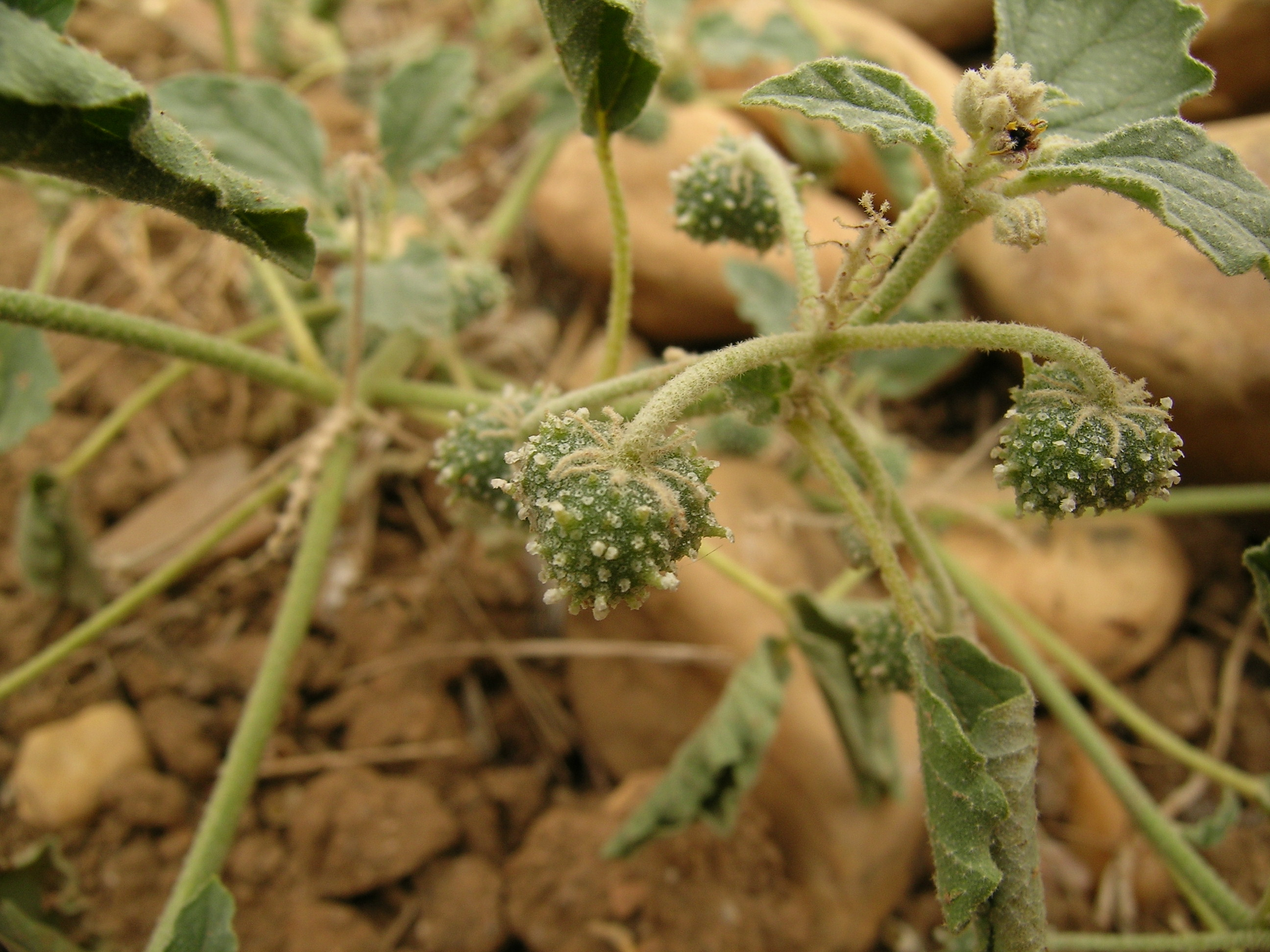
- Fruits on the plant
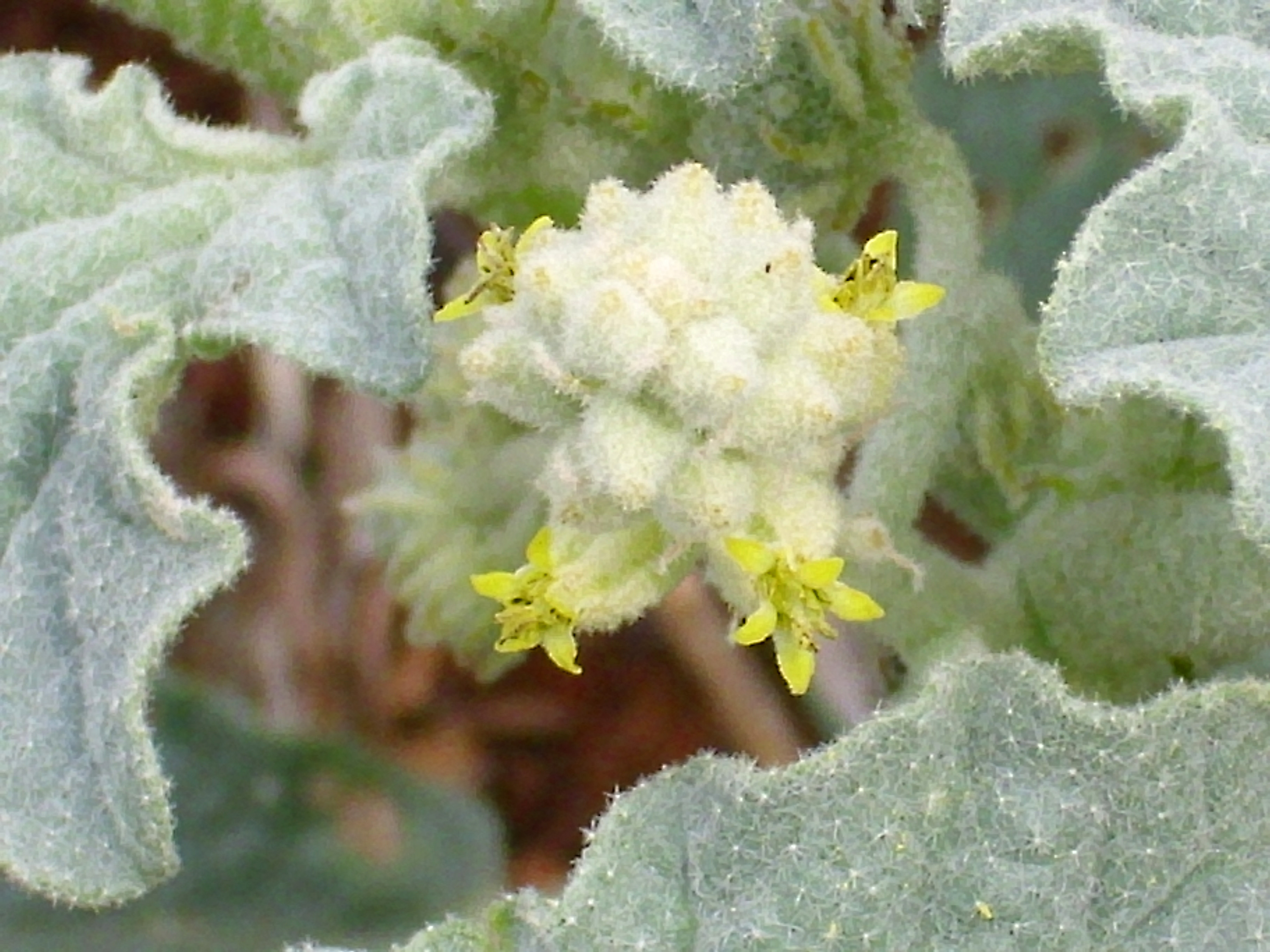
- Flower details

Scientific classification
- Kingdom: Plantae
- Clade: Embryophytes
- Clade: Tracheophytes
- Clade: Spermatophytes
- Clade: Angiosperms
- Clade: Eudicots
- Clade: Rosids
- Order: Malpighiales
- Family: Euphorbiaceae
- Genus: Chrozophora
- Species: C. tinctoria

Binomial name
- Chrozophora tinctoria (L.) A.Juss.

Synonyms
- List: Chrozophora cordifolia Pazij; Chrozophora glabrata (Heldr.) Pax & K.Hoffm.; Chrozophora hierosolymitana Spreng.; Chrozophora integrifolia Bunge; Chrozophora lepidocarpa Pazij; Chrozophora obliqua (Vahl) A.Juss. ex Spreng.; Chrozophora sieberi C.Presl; Chrozophora subplicata (Müll.Arg.) Pax & K.Hoffm.; Chrozophora verbascifolia (Willd.) A.Juss. ex Spreng.; Chrozophora villosa Lindl.; Chrozophora warionii Coss. ex Batt.; Croton argenteus Forssk.; Croton obliquus Vahl; Croton oblongifolius Sieber ex Spreng.; Croton patulus Lag.; Croton tinctorius L.; Croton verbascifolius Willd.; Ricinoides tinctoria (L.) Moench; Tournesol obliqua (Vahl) Franch.; Tournesol tinctoria (L.) Baill.; Tournesol verbascifolia (Willd.) Kuntze; Tournesol warionii (Coss. ex Batt. & Trab.) Baill.

= Chrozophora tinctoria =

Plant species in the spurge family

Chrozophora tinctoria (commonly known as dyer's croton, giradol, turnsole or dyer's litmus plant) is a plant species native to the Mediterranean, the Middle East, India, Pakistan, and Central Asia. It is also present as a weed in North America and Australia.

== Description ==
It is an annual, typically found in nutrient-poor ground. It develops a large taproot. The plant is erect and covered with wool-like hairs. The ash-green leaves are alternate. The tiny monecious flowers are grouped in a raceme. The lower, female flowers lack petals and the upper male flowers have five small yellow petals. Pollination is by ants. The fruits are conspicuous and consist of three dark green conjoined spheres. Their surface is decorated with white scales and warty structures. Each sphere contains three seeds, which are propelled away from the plant by the mechanical force of the mature fruit twisting as it opens. It is considered a poisonous plant. Its consumption may cause stomach upset, vomiting, nausea, and diarrhoea.

== Taxonomy ==
Chrozophora tinctoria was named Croton tinctorius by Carl Linnaeus in 1753. The botanist Conrad Moench classified it in the genus Ricinoides in 1794, but the accepted name of the species was created in 1824 when Adrien-Henri de Jussieu moved it to Chrozophora. Together with its genus it is part of the Euphorbiaceae family. It has no accepted subspecies or varieties, but has several among its 30 synonyms.

== Use for dye ==
Chrozophora tinctoria produced the blue-purple colorant "turnsole" (also known as katasol or folium ) used in medieval illuminated manuscripts and as a food colorant in Dutch cheese and certain liquors. Its use was mostly as substitute of the more expensive Tyrian purple, the famous dye obtained from Murex molluscs. The color comes from the plant's fruit, specifically its dry outer coat. The colorant is also obtained from the translucent sap contained in the plant cells when the leaves of the plant are broken off and exposed to the air. Different shades of blue and purple may also be obtained when the juice extracts are exposed to the vapors emitted from ammonia (NH_{3}), and which in France, during the late 19th century, was produced by applying fresh horse manure and urine to the fabric that was soaked with the plant extract. The plant has historically been used throughout the Levant to dye clothing. 100 kilograms (220 lb) of the plant produces 50 kilograms (110 lb) of sap, and with this quantity one is able to dye 25 kilograms (55 lb) of fabric rolls.

In 2020, an interdisciplinary team of researchers from FCT NOVA, University of Porto and University of Aveiro, identified the complex chemical structure of the medieval purple-blue dye extracted from the fruits of Chrozophora tinctoria. The chemical structure of the medieval dye was a mystery until now. The extracts obtained showed a novel blue chemical, chrozophoridine as the main chromophore.
