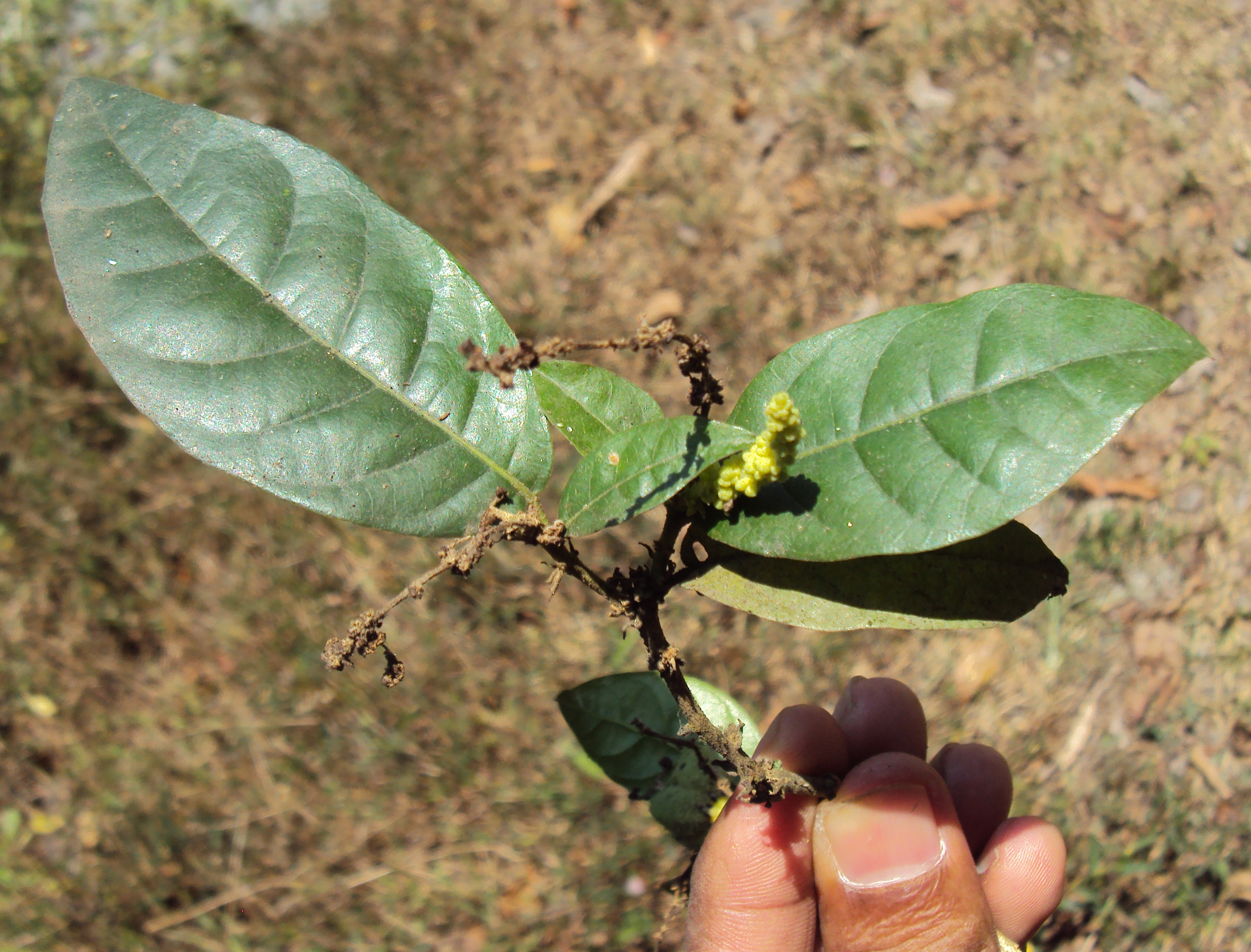
- Epiprinus mallotiformis

Scientific classification
- Kingdom: Plantae
- Clade: Embryophytes
- Clade: Tracheophytes
- Clade: Angiosperms
- Clade: Eudicots
- Clade: Rosids
- Order: Malpighiales
- Family: Euphorbiaceae
- Subfamily: Acalyphoideae
- Tribe: Epiprineae

Subtribes and genera
- Subtribe Epiprininae Adenochlaena Cephalocroton Cephalocrotonopsis Cladogynos Cleidiocarpon Epiprinus Koilodepas Subtribe Cephalomappinae Cephalomappa Baill. (syn. Muricococcum Chun & F.C.How)

= Epiprineae =

Tribe of flowering plants

Epiprineae is a tribe of plants of the family Euphorbiaceae. It comprises 2 subtribes and 9 genera.

== History ==
In 2017, the genus Tsaiodendron was discovered in Yunnan, a province of China.

== See also ==
- Taxonomy of the Euphorbiaceae
