= Chrozophoridin =

Names
- IUPAC name 6′-hydroxy-4,4′-dimethoxy-1,1′-dimethyl-5′-{[3,4,5-trihydroxy-6-(hydroxymethyl)tetrahydro-2H-pyran-2-yl]oxy}-[3,3′-bipyridine]-2,2′,5,6(1H,1′H)-tetraone

Identifiers
CAS Number	none
3D model (JSmol)	Interactive image
PubChem CID	163190750
CompTox Dashboard (EPA)	DTXSID001337058
- InChI: InChI=1S/C20H24N2O13/c1-21-16(28)7(13(32-3)12(27)18(21)30)8-14(33-4)15(19(31)22(2)17(8)29)35-20-11(26)10(25)9(24)6(5-23)34-20/h6,9-11,20,23-26,31H,5H2,1-4H3 Key: PWRIEQVXHAGZLC-UHFFFAOYSA-N
- SMILES: COC1C(=O)C(=O)N(C)C(=O)C=1C(=C2OC)C(=O)N(C)C(O)=C2OC3C(O)C(O)C(O)C(O3)CO
- Except where otherwise noted, data are given for materials in their standard state (at 25 °C [77 °F], 100 kPa). Infobox references

Chrozophoridin is a chemical used as a dye.

It is derived from the plant Chrozophora tinctoria (commonly known as dyer's croton, giradol, or turnsole), which is a species native to the Mediterranean, the Middle East, India, Pakistan, and Central Asia.

Chrozophora tinctoria produced the blue-purple colorant "turnsole" (also known as katasol or folium) used in medieval illuminated manuscripts and as a food colorant in Dutch cheese and certain liquors. The color comes from the plant's fruit, specifically its dry outer coat. The colorant is also obtained from the translucent sap contained in the plant cells when the leaves of the plant are broken off and exposed to the air. Different shades of blue and purple may also be obtained when the juice extracts are exposed to the vapors emitted from ammonia (NH_{3}), and which in France, during the late 19th century, was produced by applying fresh horse manure and urine to the fabric that was soaked with the plant extract. The plant has historically been used throughout the Levant to dye clothing. 100 kilograms (220 lb) of the plant produces 50 kilograms (110 lb) of sap, and with this quantity one is able to dye 25 kilograms (55 lb) of fabric rolls.

The chemical structure consists of a glucosyl derivative of a dimer of hermidin. The material exists as a mixture of two atropisomeric forms as a result of restricted rotation about the bond between the two hermidin rings.
