= Caperonia similis =

Scientific classification
- Kingdom: Plantae
- Clade: Tracheophytes
- Clade: Angiosperms
- Clade: Eudicots
- Clade: Rosids
- Order: Malpighiales
- Family: Euphorbiaceae
- Genus: Caperonia
- Species: C. similis

Binomial name
- Caperonia similis Pax & K.Hoffm.

Species of plant

Caperonia similis is a species of shrubs in the genus of Caperonia, native to Amazon rainforest.
