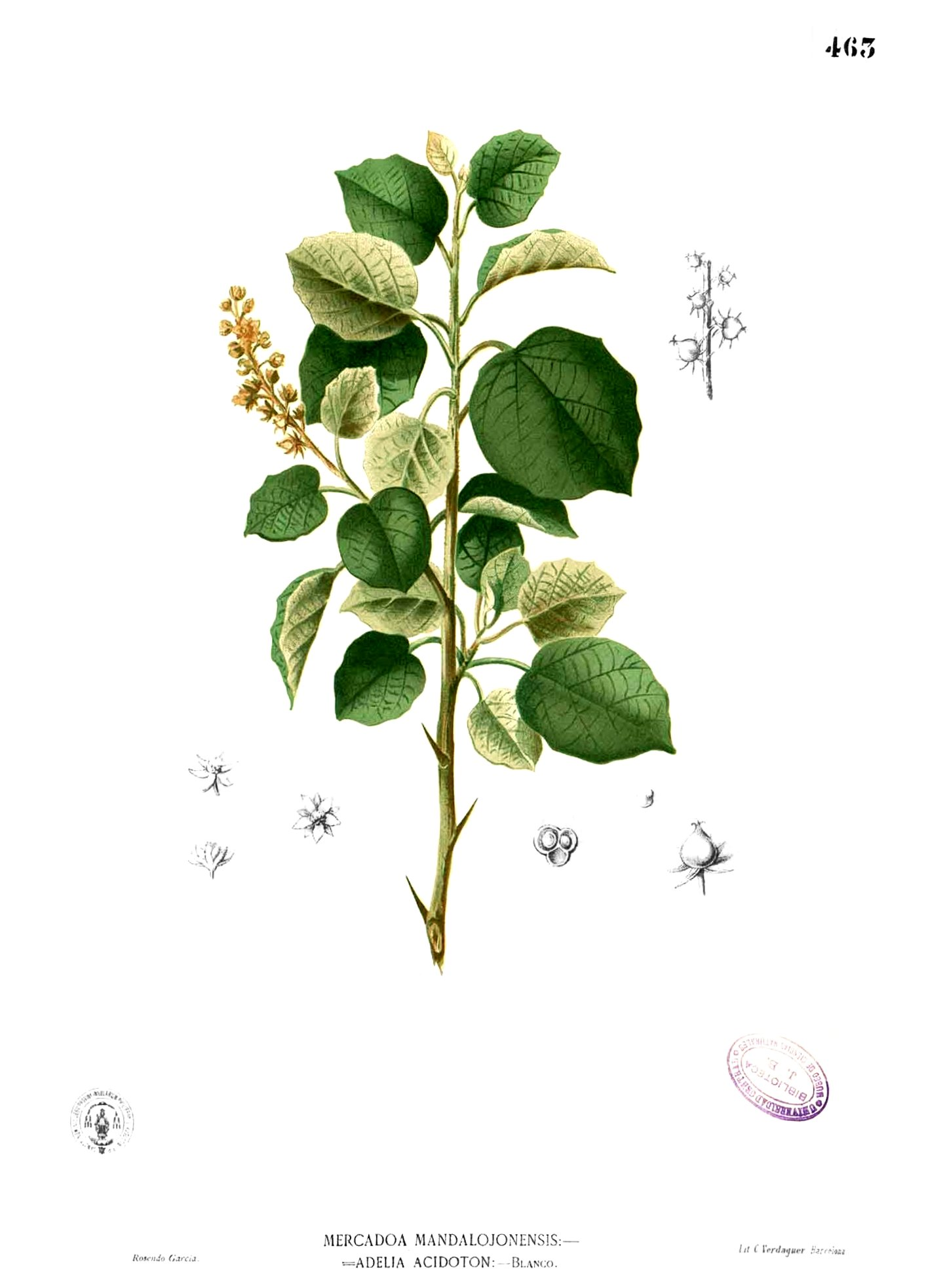
- Doryxylon spinosum

Scientific classification
- Kingdom: Plantae
- Clade: Tracheophytes
- Clade: Angiosperms
- Clade: Eudicots
- Clade: Rosids
- Order: Malpighiales
- Family: Euphorbiaceae
- Subfamily: Acalyphoideae
- Tribe: Chrozophoreae
- Subtribe: Doryxylinae
- Genus: Doryxylon; Zoll.
- Species: D. spinosum

Binomial name
- Doryxylon spinosum Zoll.

Synonyms
- Mercadoa Náves; Sumbavia Baill.; Adelia acidoton Blanco, illegitimate homonym; Sumbavia rottleroides Baill.; Mercadoa mandalojonensis Náves

= Doryxylon =

Genus of flowering plants

Doryxylon is a monotypic plant genus in the family Euphorbiaceae first described as a genus in 1857. The sole species is Doryxylon spinosum. It is found on the Island of Luzon in the Philippines and in the Lesser Sunda Islands of southern Indonesia.

Formerly included

Doryxylon albicans (Blume) N.P.Balakr. syn of Sumbaviopsis albicans (Blume) J.J.Sm.
