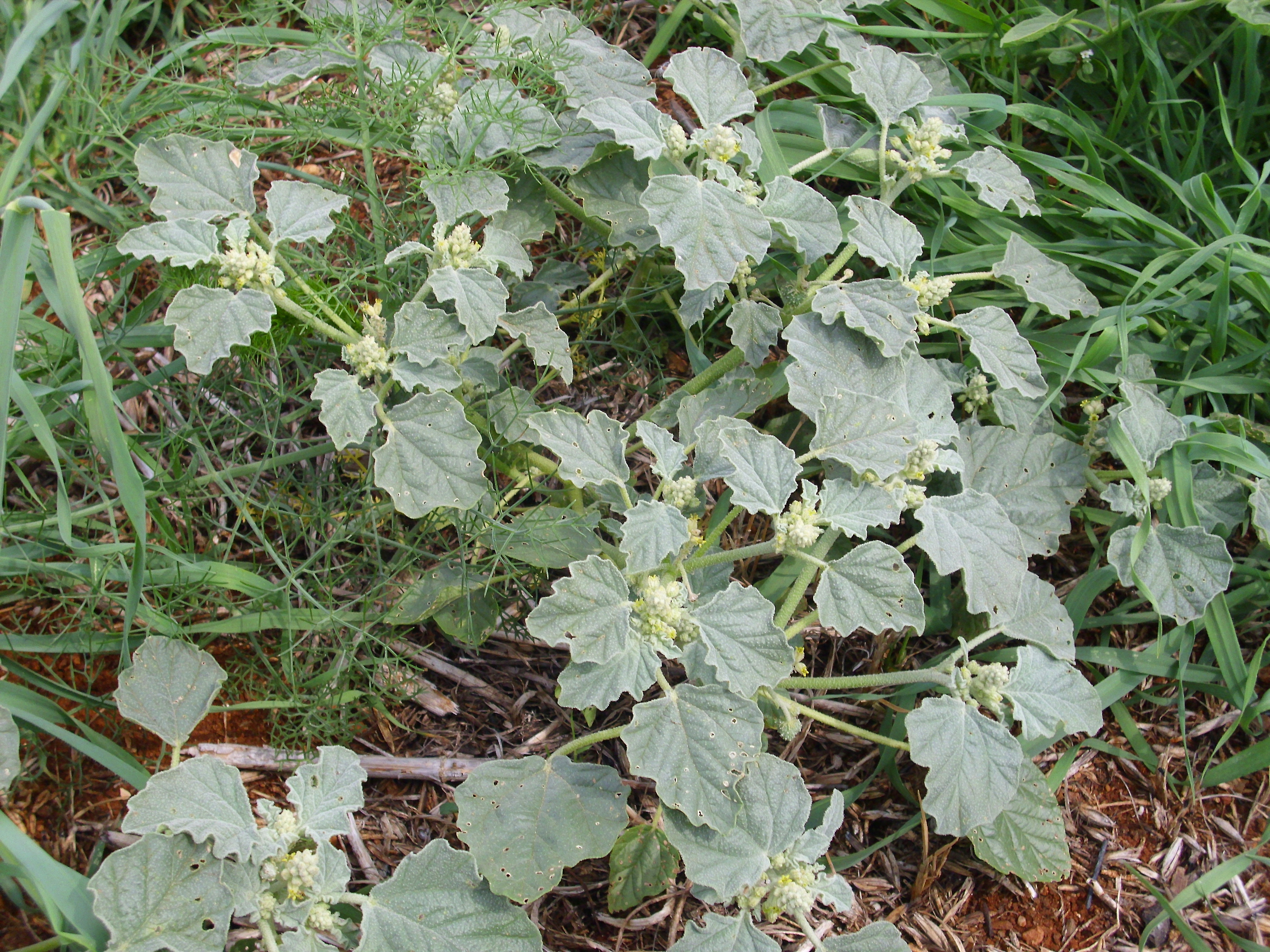
- Chrozophora tinctoria

Scientific classification
- Kingdom: Plantae
- Clade: Tracheophytes
- Clade: Angiosperms
- Clade: Eudicots
- Clade: Rosids
- Order: Malpighiales
- Family: Euphorbiaceae
- Subfamily: Acalyphoideae
- Tribe: Chrozophoreae
- Subtribe: Chrozophorinae
- Genus: Chrozophora; Neck. ex A.Juss. 1824 not Pax & K. Hoffm. 1919

Type species
- Chrozophora tinctoria (L.) A.Juss.

Synonyms
- Crossophora Link.; Crozophora A.Juss. (spelling variation); Ricinoides Moench; Tournesol Adans.; Tournesolia Scop.

= Chrozophora =

Genus of flowering plants

Chrozophora is a plant genus of the family Euphorbiaceae first described as a genus in 1824. It comprises monoecious herbs or undershrubs. The genus is widespread across Europe, Africa, and Asia.

Chrozophora tinctoria produced the blue-purple colorant "turnsole" used in medieval illuminated manuscripts and as a food colorant.

Species

1. Chrozophora brocchiana - Sahara and Sahel regions of Africa; Cape Verde
2. Chrozophora gangetica - India
3. Chrozophora mujunkumi - Uzbekistan
4. Chrozophora oblongifolia - E Africa, Middle East, India, Pakistan
5. Chrozophora plicata - Sub-Saharan Africa, Arabian Peninsula, India, Pakistan, Thailand, Myanmar, Java
6. Chrozophora rottleri - Indian Subcontinent, Afghanistan, Indochina
7. Chrozophora sabulosa - Arabian Peninsula, Iran, Pakistan, Central Asia, Xinjiang
8. Chrozophora sabulosa - W Africa
9. Chrozophora tinctoria - Mediterranean, Middle East, India, Pakistan, Central Asia

Formerly included

moved to other genera (Codiaeum and Mallotus)

1. C. mollissima - Mallotus mollissimus
2. C. peltata - Codiaeum peltatum
