= Argythamnia haplostigma =

Scientific classification
- Kingdom: Plantae
- Clade: Tracheophytes
- Clade: Angiosperms
- Clade: Eudicots
- Clade: Rosids
- Order: Malpighiales
- Family: Euphorbiaceae
- Genus: Argythamnia
- Species: A. haplostigma

Binomial name
- Argythamnia haplostigma Pax & K.Hoffm.

Species of flowering plant

Argythamnia haplostigma is a species of flowering plant in the family Euphorbiaceae. It is native to the south-west Caribbean (the island of Roatán). It was first described in 1912.
