= Koilodepas ferrugineum =

Conservation status
- Critically Endangered (IUCN 2.3)

Scientific classification
- Kingdom: Plantae
- Clade: Tracheophytes
- Clade: Angiosperms
- Clade: Eudicots
- Clade: Rosids
- Order: Malpighiales
- Family: Euphorbiaceae
- Genus: Koilodepas
- Species: K. ferrugineum

Binomial name
- Koilodepas ferrugineum Hook.f.

Species of tree

Koilodepas ferrugineum is a species of plant in the family Euphorbiaceae. It is a tree endemic to Peninsular Malaysia. It is threatened by habitat loss.
