= Argythamnia proctorii =

Cayman silverbush

Conservation status
- Least Concern (IUCN 3.1)

Scientific classification
- Kingdom: Plantae
- Clade: Tracheophytes
- Clade: Angiosperms
- Clade: Eudicots
- Clade: Rosids
- Order: Malpighiales
- Family: Euphorbiaceae
- Genus: Argythamnia
- Species: A. proctorii

Binomial name
- Argythamnia proctorii J.W.Ingram

Species of flowering plant

Argythamnia proctorii, the Cayman silverbush, is a species of silverbush that is endemic to the Cayman Islands. It is widespread in the forests of all three Cayman Islands, and its population is estimated to be 428,000 mature individuals. It is an erect, wiry-stemmed plant growing to about 1.5 m tall. It is monoecious, and seed capsules are produced year-round. When the seed capsules are ripe, they dry and explode, scattering the seeds.
