= Cephalomappa =

Scientific classification
- Kingdom: Plantae
- Clade: Tracheophytes
- Clade: Angiosperms
- Clade: Eudicots
- Clade: Rosids
- Order: Malpighiales
- Family: Euphorbiaceae
- Subfamily: Acalyphoideae
- Tribe: Epiprineae
- Subtribe: Cephalomappinae
- Genus: Cephalomappa; Baill.

Type species
- Cephalomappa beccariana Baill.

Synonyms
- Muricococcum Chun & F.C.How

Genus of flowering plants

Cephalomappa is a genus of flowering plants in the family Euphorbiaceae first described as a genus in 1874. It includes six species native to western Malesia (Borneo, Peninsular Malaysia, and Sumatra), Vietnam, and southern China.

== Species ==
Six species are accepted.

- Cephalomappa beccariana Baill. – Borneo (Sarawak)
- Cephalomappa lepidotula Airy Shaw – Malaysia, Borneo, Sumatra
- Cephalomappa malloticarpa J.J.Sm. – Malaysia, Borneo, Sumatra
- Cephalomappa paludicola Airy Shaw – Sarawak
- Cephalomappa penangensis Ridl. – Peninsular Malaysia
- Cephalomappa sinensis (Chun & F.C.How) Kosterm. – southern China and Vietnam
