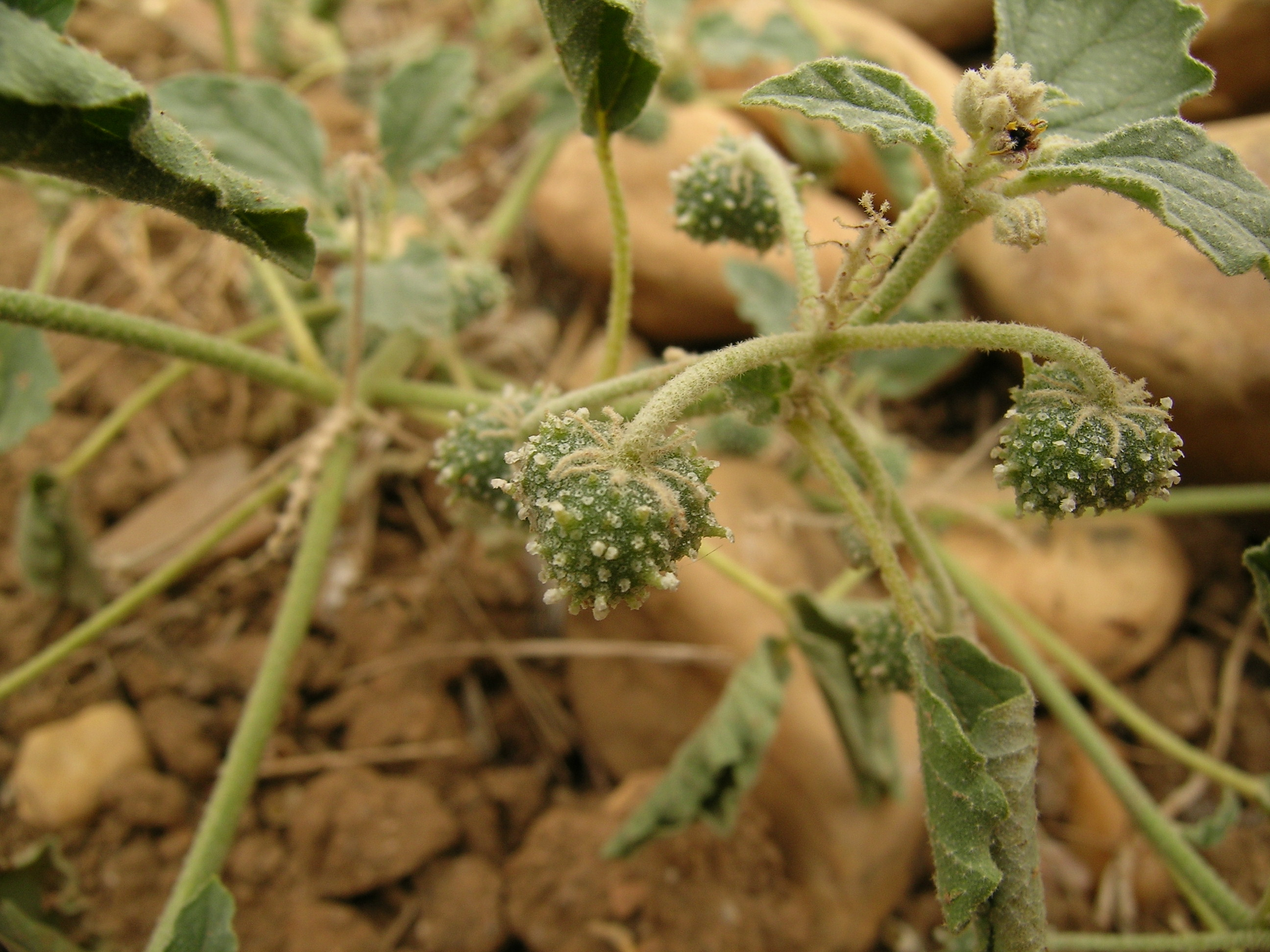
- Chrozophora tinctoria

Scientific classification
- Kingdom: Plantae
- Clade: Tracheophytes
- Clade: Angiosperms
- Clade: Eudicots
- Clade: Rosids
- Order: Malpighiales
- Family: Euphorbiaceae
- Subfamily: Acalyphoideae
- Tribe: Chrozophoreae

= Chrozophoreae =

Tribe of flowering plants

Chrozophoreae is a tribe of flowering plants in the family Euphorbiaceae.

== Subtribes and genera ==
The U.S. National Plant Germplasm System lists four subtribes:

=== Chrozophorinae ===
- Chrozophora A. Juss. - type genus

=== Ditaxinae ===
- Argythamnia
- Caperonia
- Chiropetalum
- Ditaxis
- Philyra

=== Doryxylinae ===
- Doryxylon
- Melanolepis
- Sumbaviopsis
- Thyrsanthera

=== Speranskiinae ===
- Speranskia (Bunge) Baill.

== See also ==
- Taxonomy of the Euphorbiaceae
