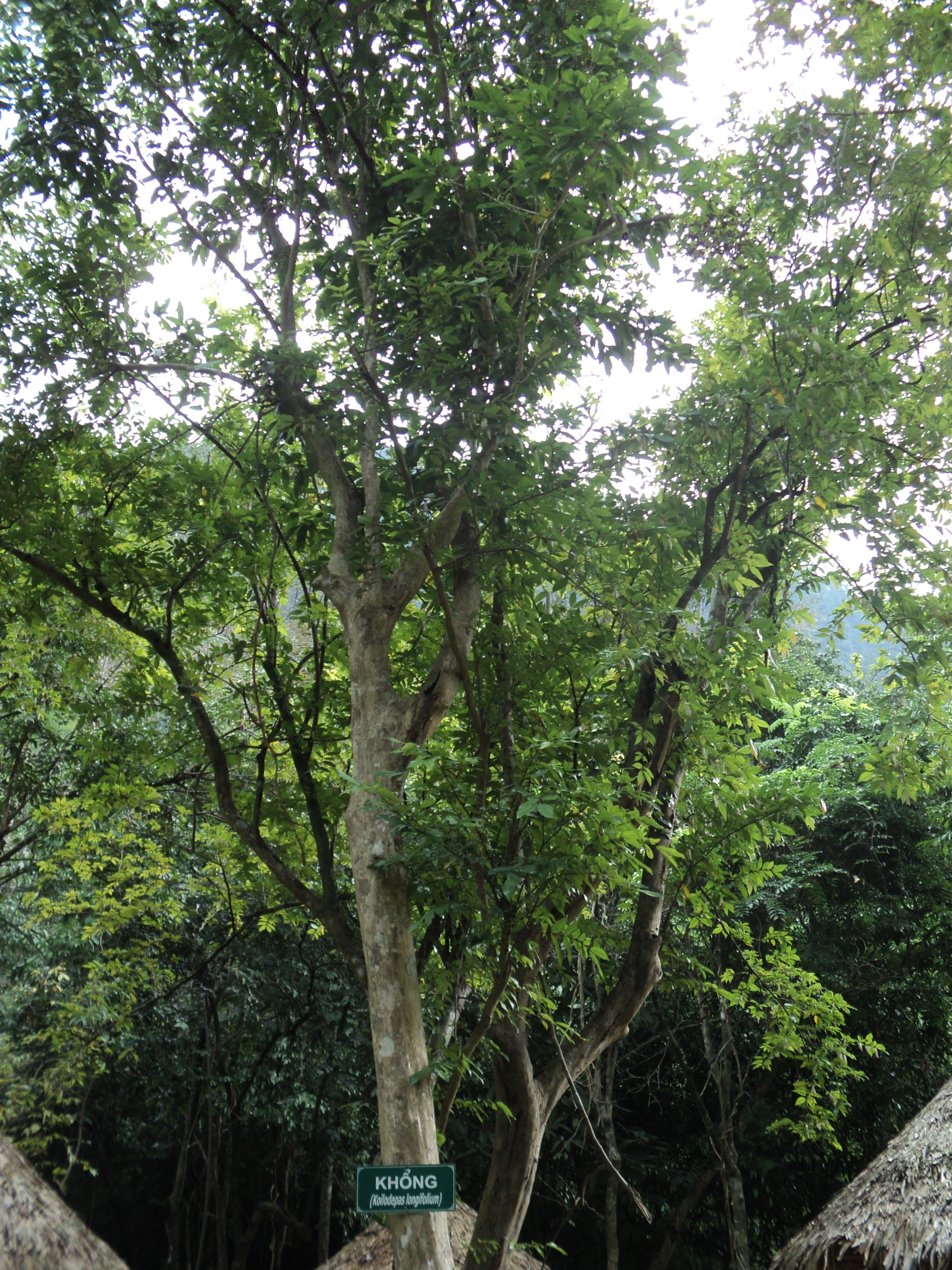
- Koilodepas longifolium

Scientific classification
- Kingdom: Plantae
- Clade: Tracheophytes
- Clade: Angiosperms
- Clade: Eudicots
- Clade: Rosids
- Order: Malpighiales
- Family: Euphorbiaceae
- Subfamily: Acalyphoideae
- Tribe: Epiprineae
- Subtribe: Epiprininae
- Genus: Koilodepas; Hassk.

Synonyms
- Caelodepas Benth. spelling variation; Calpigyne Blume; Coelodepas Hassk. spelling variation; Nephrostylus Gagnep.

= Koilodepas =

Genus of flowering plants

Koilodepas is a genus of plant of the family Euphorbiaceae first described as a genus in 1856. It is native to Southeast Asia, India, Hainan, and New Guinea.

Species

1. Koilodepas bantamense Hassk. - Java, Sumatra
2. Koilodepas brevipes Merr. - Sabah, Kalimantan
3. Koilodepas calycinum Bedd. - Tamil Nadu
4. Koilodepas cordisepalum Welzen & Muzzaz. - Sumatra
5. Koilodepas ferrugineum Hook.f. - Peninsular Malaysia
6. Koilodepas frutescens (Blume) Airy Shaw - Kalimantan Selatan
7. Koilodepas hainanese (Merr.) Croizat - Hainan
8. Koilodepas homaliifolium Airy Shaw - Papua New Guinea
9. Koilodepas laevigatum Airy Shaw - Sarawak, Sabah
10. Koilodepas longifolium Hook.f. - Thailand, Vietnam, Malaysia, Borneo, Sumatra
11. Koilodepas pectinatum Airy Shaw - Sabah
12. Koilodepas wallichianum Benth. - Peninsular Malaysia

Formerly included

moved to Claoxylon

- Koilodepas hosei Merr., synonym of Claoxylon hosei (Merr.) Airy Shaw
