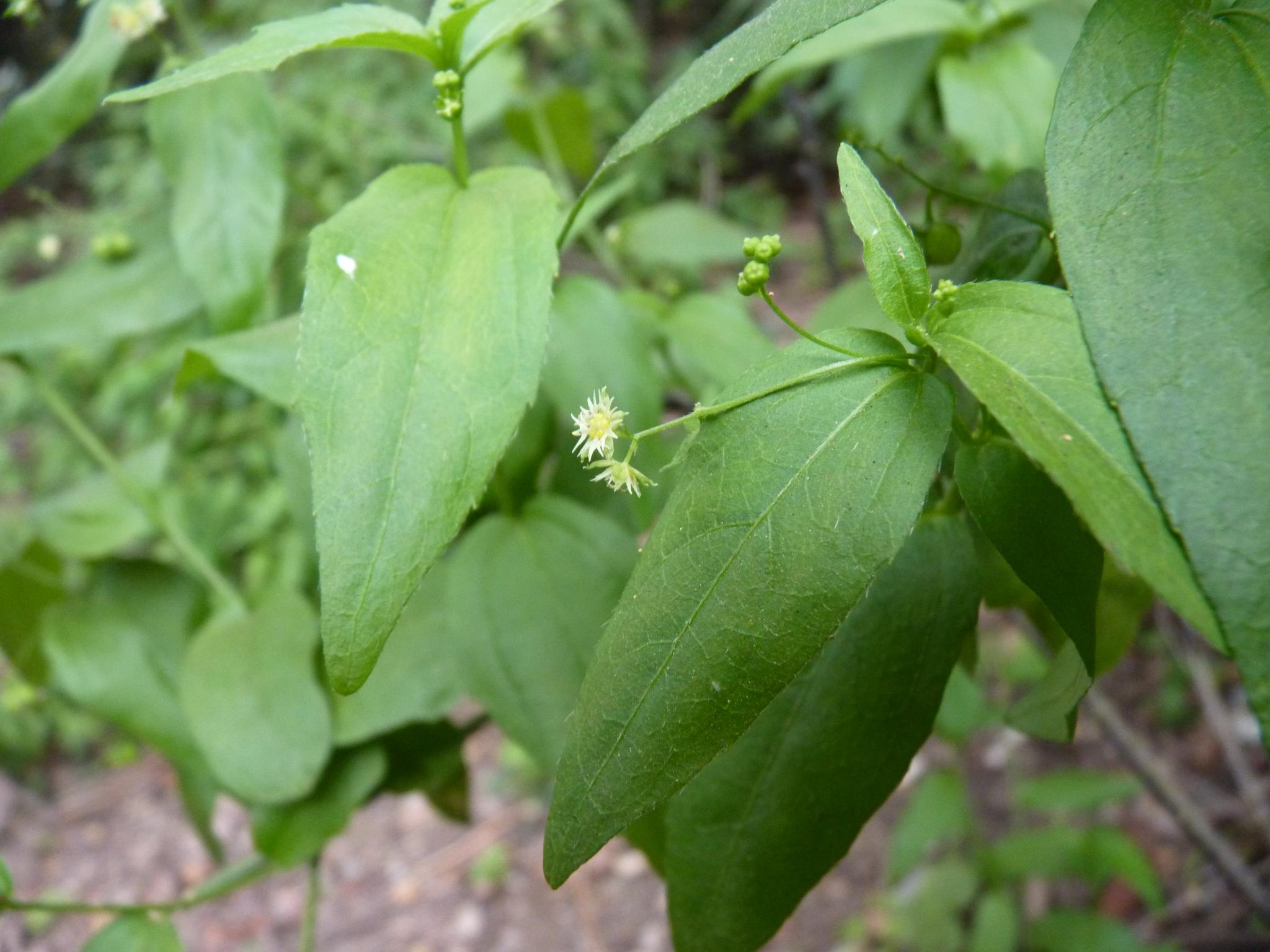
- Chiropetalum tricuspidatum in Valparaiso Region, Central Chile

Scientific classification
- Kingdom: Plantae
- Clade: Tracheophytes
- Clade: Angiosperms
- Clade: Eudicots
- Clade: Rosids
- Order: Malpighiales
- Family: Euphorbiaceae
- Subfamily: Acalyphoideae
- Tribe: Chrozophoreae
- Subtribe: Ditaxinae
- Genus: Chiropetalum; A.Juss.

Synonyms
- Aonikena Speg.; Chlorocaulon Klotzsch; Argythamnia subgen. Chiropetalum (A. Juss.) J.W. Ingram; Desfontaena Vell.; Desfontaina Steud.; Desfontainea Rchb.

= Chiropetalum =

Genus of flowering plants

Chiropetalum is a plant genus of the family Euphorbiaceae first described as a genus in 1832. It is widespread across relatively dry regions of North and South America from Texas to Uruguay.

Species

1. Chiropetalum anisotrichum - Rio Grande do Sul
2. Chiropetalum argentinense - N Argentina
3. Chiropetalum astroplethos - Coahuila, Nuevo León, Texas, Veracruz
4. Chiropetalum berterianum - Chile
5. Chiropetalum boliviense - Bolivia, NW Argentina
6. Chiropetalum canescens - N Chile
7. Chiropetalum cremnophilum - N Chile
8. Chiropetalum foliosum - S Brazil
9. Chiropetalum griseum - Brazil, N Argentina, Paraguay
10. Chiropetalum gymnadenium - Minas Gerais, São Paulo
11. Chiropetalum intermedium - Uruguay, Buenos Aires
12. Chiropetalum molle - Rio Grande do Sul
13. Chiropetalum patagonicum - Argentina
14. Chiropetalum pavonianum - Peru
15. Chiropetalum phalacradenium - Santa Catarina
16. Chiropetalum pilosistylum - Rio Grande do Sul
17. Chiropetalum puntaloberense - Uruguay
18. Chiropetalum quinquecuspidatum - Peru
19. Chiropetalum ramboi - Rio Grande do Sul
20. Chiropetalum ruizianum - Peru
21. Chiropetalum schiedeanum - Mexico
22. Chiropetalum tricoccum - S Brazil, N Argentina, Paraguay, Uruguay
23. Chiropetalum tricuspidatum - Chile
