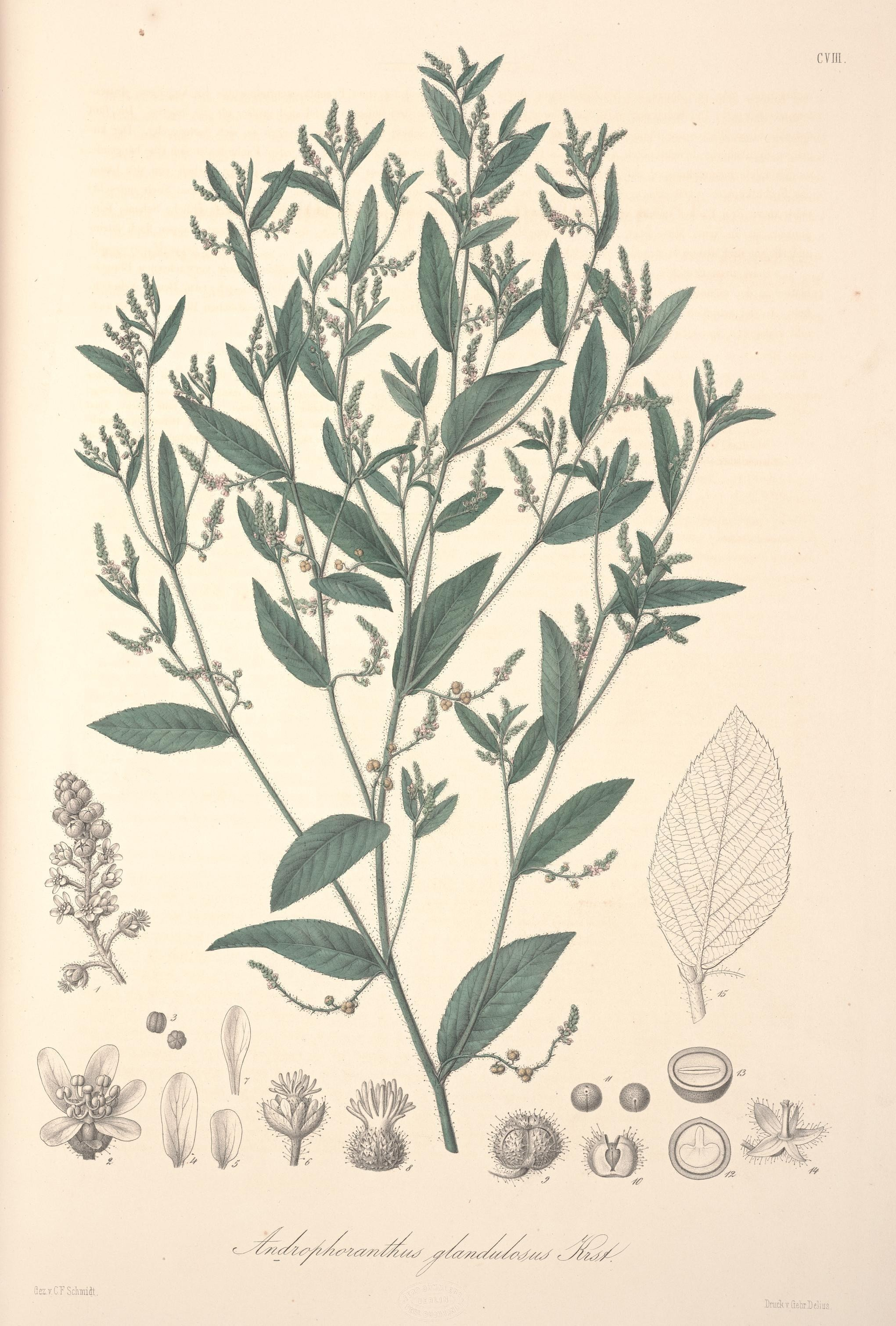
- Illustration of C. palustris under synonymised name

Scientific classification
- Kingdom: Plantae
- Clade: Tracheophytes
- Clade: Angiosperms
- Clade: Eudicots
- Clade: Rosids
- Order: Malpighiales
- Family: Euphorbiaceae
- Genus: Caperonia
- Species: C. palustris

Binomial name
- Caperonia palustris A.St.-Hil.

Synonyms
- Androphoranthus glandulosus H.Karst.

= Caperonia palustris =

Species of plant

Caperonia palustris is a species of plant, belonging to the genus Caperonia. It is native to tropical and subtropical America and Africa.

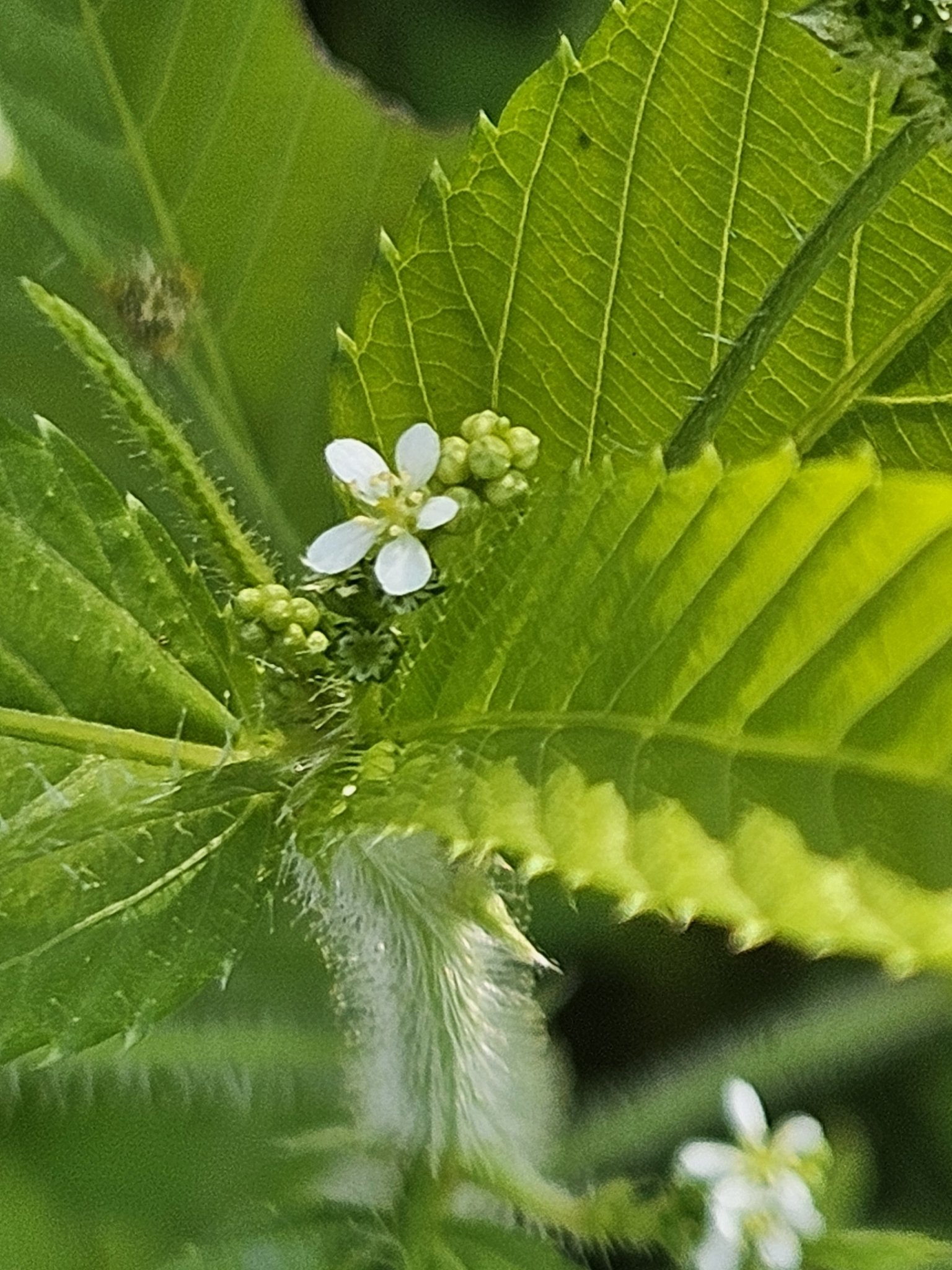
Close up of flower of Caperonia palustris
