= Koilodepas calycinum =

Conservation status
- Endangered (IUCN 2.3)

Scientific classification
- Kingdom: Plantae
- Clade: Tracheophytes
- Clade: Angiosperms
- Clade: Eudicots
- Clade: Rosids
- Order: Malpighiales
- Family: Euphorbiaceae
- Genus: Koilodepas
- Species: K. calycinum

Binomial name
- Koilodepas calycinum Bedd.

Synonyms
- Adenochlaena calycina Bedd.

Species of flowering plant

Koilodepas calycinum is a species of flowering plant in the family Euphorbiaceae. It is a shrub or tree endemic to Tamil Nadu in southern India, and is endangered due to habitat loss. It grows as a small tree up to 6 metres (20 ft) tall, with elliptical or obovate leaves, at elevations of 670–830 metres (2,200–2,720 ft). It grows in submontane evergreen forest.
