= Caperonia aculeolata =

Scientific classification
- Kingdom: Plantae
- Clade: Tracheophytes
- Clade: Angiosperms
- Clade: Eudicots
- Clade: Rosids
- Order: Malpighiales
- Family: Euphorbiaceae
- Genus: Caperonia
- Species: C. aculeolata

Binomial name
- Caperonia aculeolata Müll. Arg.

Species of plant

Caperonia aculeolata is a species of shrub in the genus Caperonia, native to Amazon rainforest.
