= Tsaiodendron =

Scientific classification
- Kingdom: Plantae
- Clade: Tracheophytes
- Clade: Angiosperms
- Clade: Eudicots
- Clade: Rosids
- Order: Malpighiales
- Family: Euphorbiaceae
- Genus: Tsaiodendron; Y.H.Tan, H.Zhu & H.Sun
- Species: T. dioicum

Binomial name
- Tsaiodendron dioicum Y.H.Tan, Z.Zhou & B.J.Gu

Genus of flowering plants

Tsaiodendron is a genus of flowering plants belonging to the family Euphorbiaceae. It includes a single species, Tsaiodendron dioicum, which is endemic to Yunnan province of south-central China.
