= Speranskia =

Scientific classification
- Kingdom: Plantae
- Clade: Tracheophytes
- Clade: Angiosperms
- Clade: Eudicots
- Clade: Rosids
- Order: Malpighiales
- Family: Euphorbiaceae
- Subfamily: Acalyphoideae
- Tribe: Chrozophoreae
- Subtribe: Speranskiinae
- Genus: Speranskia; Baill.

Type species
- Speranskia tuberculata (Bunge) Baill.

Genus of flowering plants

Speranskia is a plant genus of the family Euphorbiaceae first described in 1858. It is the only genus of the subtribe Speranskiinae. The entire genus is endemic to China.

Species

1. Speranskia cantonensis (Hance) Pax & K.Hoffm. - Hubei, Guangdong
2. Speranskia tuberculata (Bunge) Baill. - Anhui, Gansu, Hebei, Henan, Jilin, Liaoning, Nei Mongol, Ningxia, Shaanxi, Shandong, Shanxi, Sichuan
3. Speranskia yunnanensis S.M.Hwang - Yunnan
