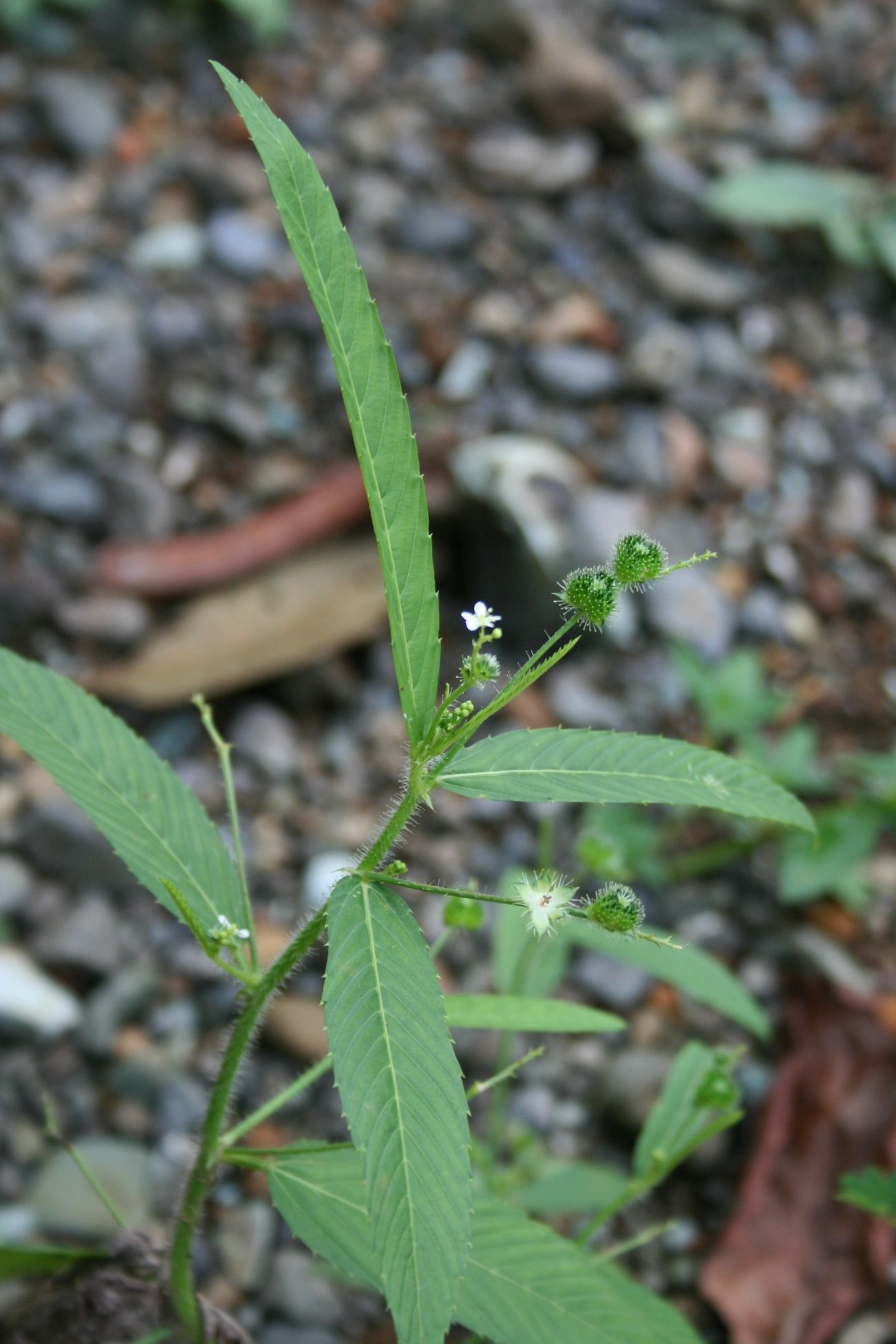
- Caperonia palustris

Scientific classification
- Kingdom: Plantae
- Clade: Tracheophytes
- Clade: Angiosperms
- Clade: Eudicots
- Clade: Rosids
- Order: Malpighiales
- Family: Euphorbiaceae
- Subtribe: Ditaxinae
- Genus: Caperonia; A.St.-Hil.

Synonyms
- Acanthopyxis Miq. ex Lanj. not validly published; Androphoranthus H.Karst.; Cavanilla Vell. 1829, illegitimate homonym, not J.F. Gmel. 1792 (Malvaceae) nor Thunb. 1792 (Icacinaceae) nor Salisb. 1792 (Theaceae); Lepidococea Turcz.; Meterana Raf.

= Caperonia =

False croton

Genus of flowering plants

Caperonia (false croton) is a genus of plants of the family Euphorbiaceae first described as a genus in 1825. The genus is native to tropical and subtropical America and Africa.

Species

1. Caperonia aculeolata - S Brazil
2. Caperonia altissima - Paraguay
3. Caperonia angustissima - Guyana
4. Caperonia bahiensis - E Brazil, Paraguay
5. Caperonia buettneriacea - S Brazil
6. Caperonia capiibariensis - Paraguay
7. Caperonia castaneifolia - widespread from Mexico + West Indies to Paraguay + NE Argentina; naturalized in Florida, Alabama
8. Caperonia castrobarrosiana - Maranhão
9. Caperonia chiltepecensis - Veracruz, Oaxaca
10. Caperonia corchoroides - Guyana, Suriname
11. Caperonia cordata - S Brazil, NE Argentina, Paraguay, Uruguay
12. Caperonia cubana - Cuba
13. Caperonia fistulosa - Africa from Mali to Somalia to Namibia
14. Caperonia gardneri - Brazil
15. Caperonia glabrata - Paraguay, Formosa
16. Caperonia heteropetala - S Brazil
17. Caperonia langsdorffii - São Paulo, Mato Grosso
18. Caperonia latifolia W + C Africa from Togo to Tanzania
19. Caperonia latior - Paraguay
20. Caperonia linearifolia - S Brazil, NE Argentina, Uruguay
21. Caperonia lutea - Guyana
22. Caperonia multicostata - E Brazil
23. Caperonia neglecta - Veracruz, Honduras, Panama, Colombia, Venezuela, Bolivia
24. Caperonia palustris - widespread from SE + SC United States to Paraguay + N Argentina
25. Caperonia paraguayensis - Paraguay
26. Caperonia regnellii - Minas Gerais
27. Caperonia rutenbergii - Madagascar
28. Caperonia serrata - tropical Africa
29. Caperonia similis - Amazonas in NW Brazil
30. Caperonia stenophylla - Minas Gerais, 3 Guianas
31. Caperonia stuhlmannii - Tanzania (incl. Zanzibar), Malawi, Mozambique, Zambia, Zimbabwe, KwaZulu-Natal
32. Caperonia subrotunda - Somalia
33. Caperonia vellozoana - Rio de Janeiro
34. Caperonia zaponzeta - Peru
