= Chiropetalum cremnophilum =

Scientific classification
- Kingdom: Plantae
- Clade: Tracheophytes
- Clade: Angiosperms
- Clade: Eudicots
- Clade: Rosids
- Order: Malpighiales
- Family: Euphorbiaceae
- Genus: Chiropetalum
- Species: C. cremnophilum

Binomial name
- Chiropetalum cremnophilum I.M. Johnst.

Species of plant

Chiropetalum cremnophilum is a species of flowering plant in the family Euphorbiaceae. It is a sub-shrub endemic to Chile, where it is distributed along the northern regions of Antofagasta, Atacama and Coquimbo.
