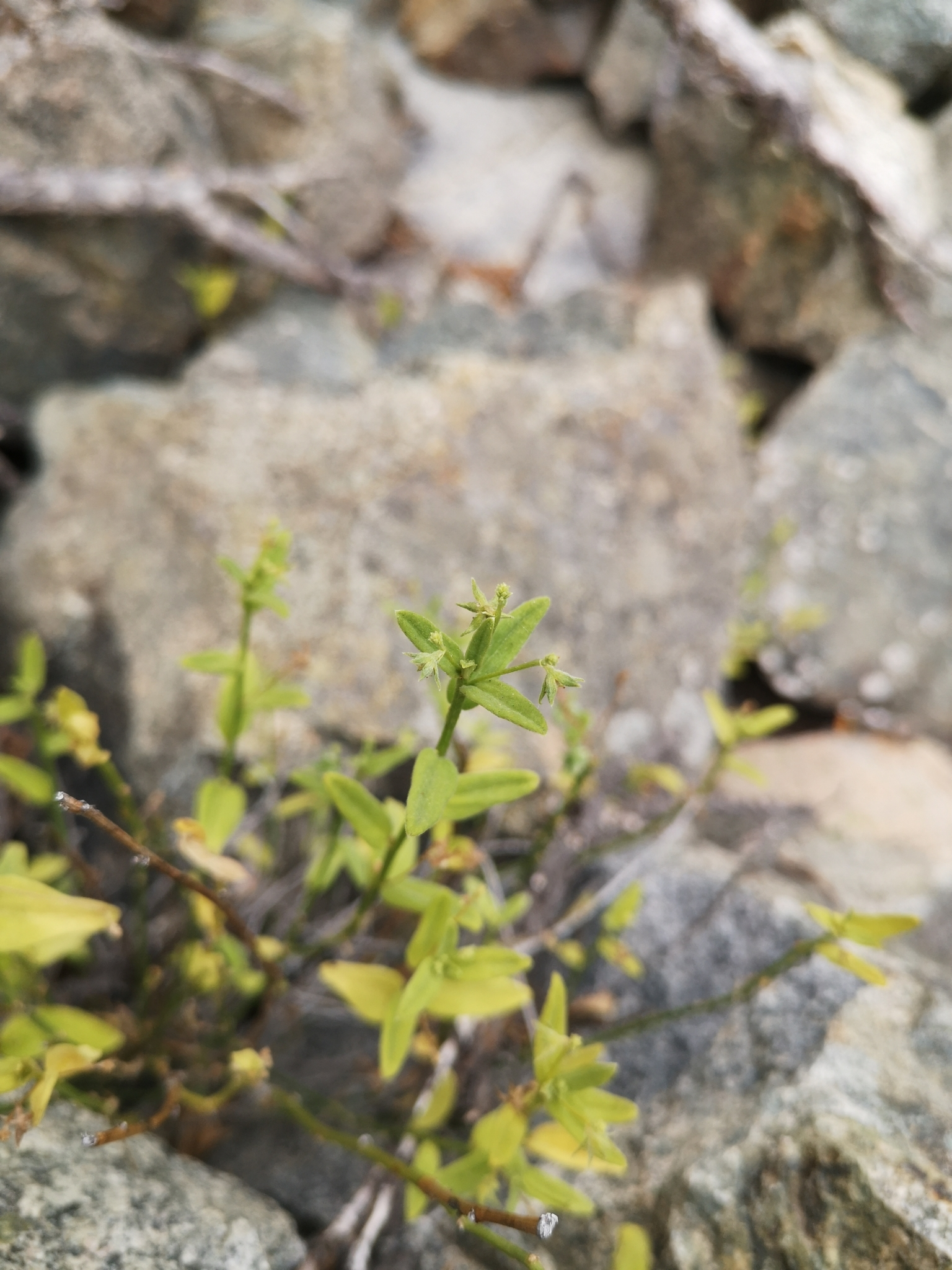

Scientific classification
- Kingdom: Plantae
- Clade: Tracheophytes
- Clade: Angiosperms
- Clade: Eudicots
- Clade: Rosids
- Order: Malpighiales
- Family: Euphorbiaceae
- Genus: Chiropetalum
- Species: C. canescens

Binomial name
- Chiropetalum canescens Phil.

Synonyms
- Argythamnia canescens (Phil.) F.Phil.; Argythamnia sponiella Müll.Arg.; Chiropetalum gigouxii Espinosa; Chiropetalum sponiella (Müll.Arg.) Pax

= Chiropetalum canescens =

Species of plant

Chiropetalum canescens is a species of flowering plant in the family Euphorbiaceae. It is a sub-shrub endemic to Chile, where it is distributed along the northern regions of Antofagasta and Atacama.
