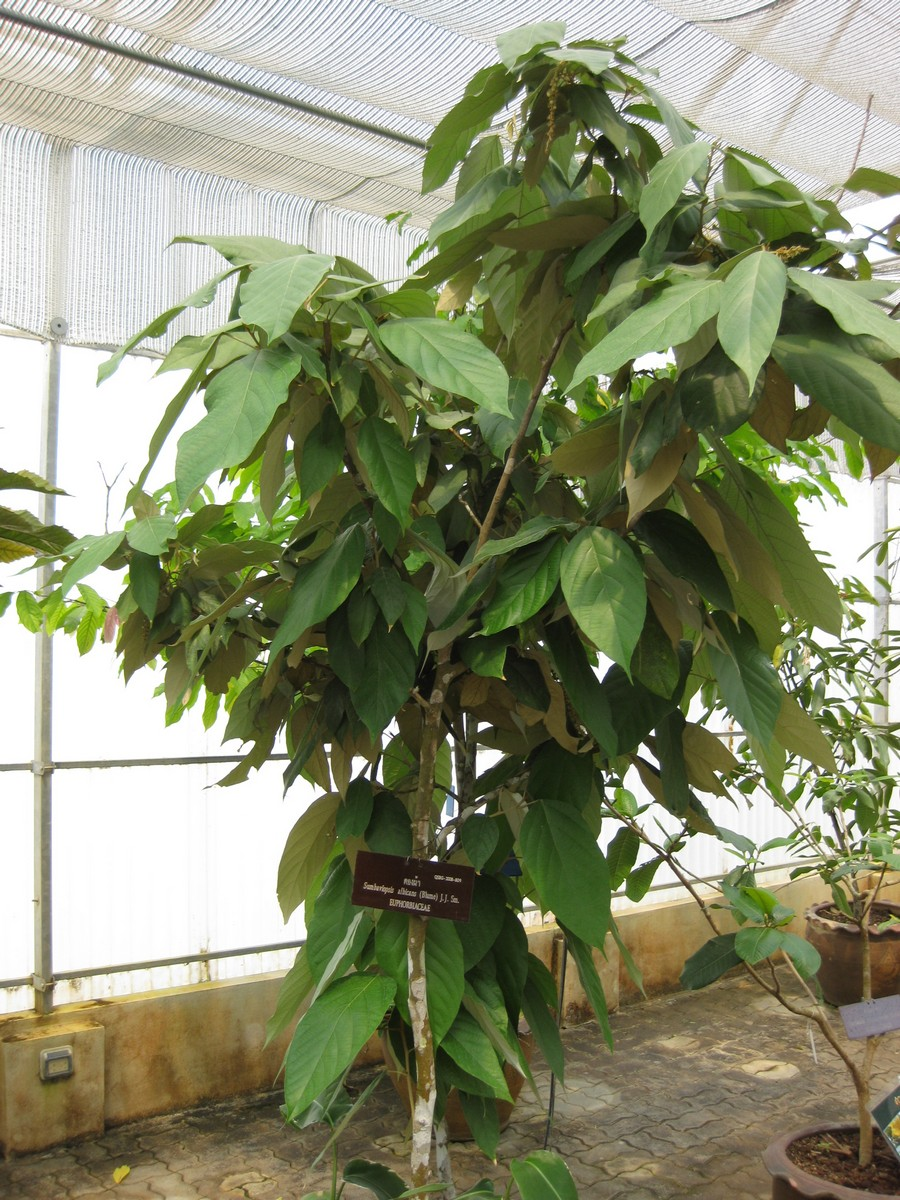
- Sumbaviopsis albicans at Queen Sirikit Botanic Garden, Thailand

Scientific classification
- Kingdom: Plantae
- Clade: Tracheophytes
- Clade: Angiosperms
- Clade: Eudicots
- Clade: Rosids
- Order: Malpighiales
- Family: Euphorbiaceae
- Subfamily: Acalyphoideae
- Tribe: Chrozophoreae
- Subtribe: Doryxylinae
- Genus: Sumbaviopsis; J.J.Sm.
- Species: S. albicans

Binomial name
- Sumbaviopsis albicans (Blume) J.J.Sm.

Synonyms
- Adisca albicans Blume; Croton albicans (Blume) Rchb.f. & Zoll.; Rottlera albicans (Blume) Morales ex Rchb.f. & Zoll.; Cephalocroton albicans (Blume) Müll.Arg.; Doryxylon albicans (Blume) N.P.Balakr.; Sumbavia macrophylla Müll.Arg; Coelodiscus speciosus Müll.Arg.; Mallotus speciosus (Müll.Arg.) Pax & K.Hoffm.; Sumbaviopsis albicans var. disperma Gagnep.

= Sumbaviopsis =

Genus of flowering plants

Sumbaviopsis is a genus of plants in the family Euphorbiaceae first described as a genus in 1910. It contains only one known species, Sumbaviopsis albicans, native to Yunnan, the eastern Himalayas, and Southeast Asia (Indochina, Malaysia, Indonesia, Philippines).
