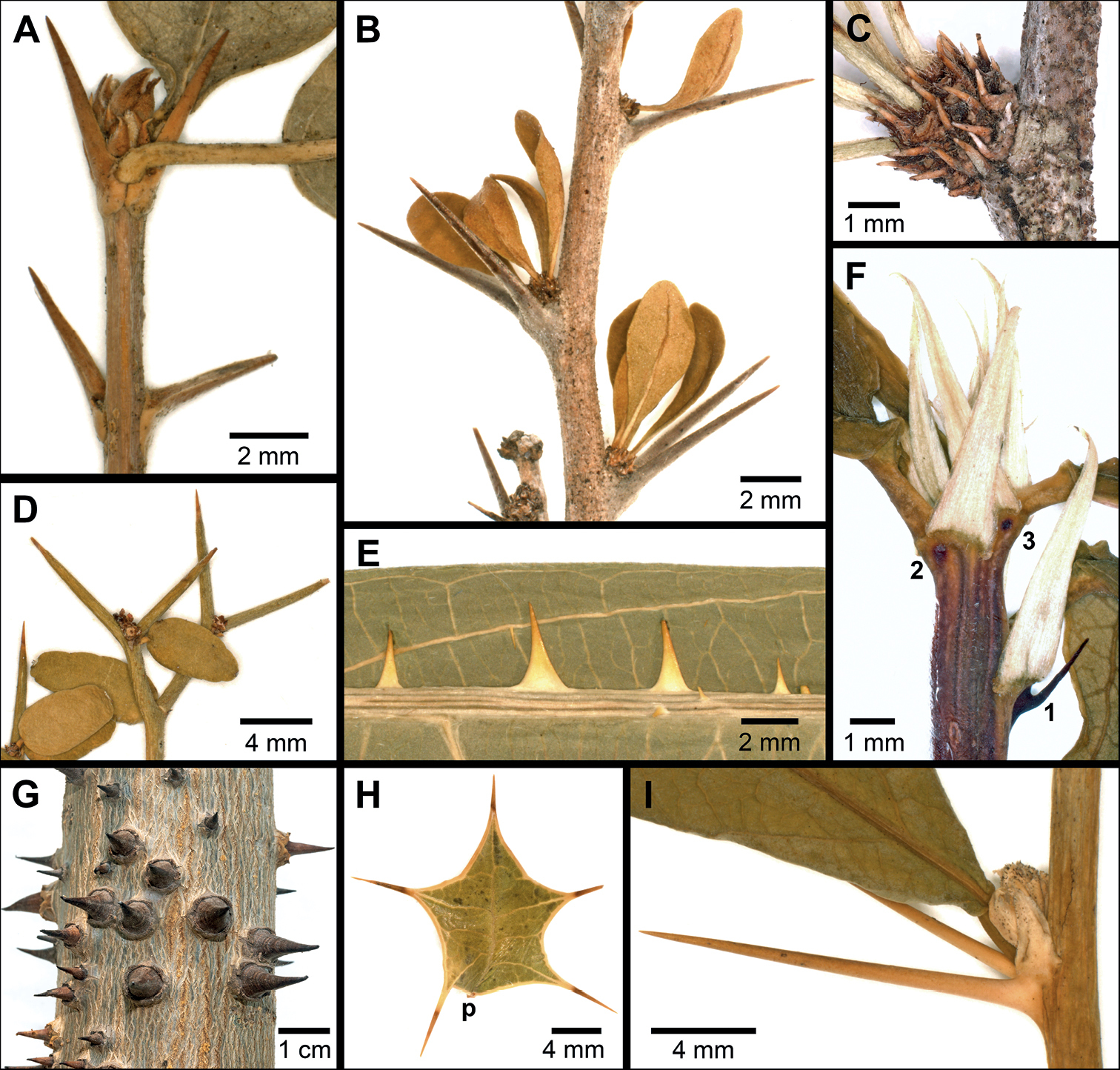
- F: Philyra brasiliensis

Scientific classification
- Kingdom: Plantae
- Clade: Tracheophytes
- Clade: Angiosperms
- Clade: Eudicots
- Clade: Rosids
- Order: Malpighiales
- Family: Euphorbiaceae
- Subfamily: Acalyphoideae
- Tribe: Chrozophoreae
- Subtribe: Ditaxinae
- Genus: Philyra; Klotzsch
- Species: P. brasiliensis

Binomial name
- Philyra brasiliensis Klotzsch

Synonyms
- Phyllera Endl., spelling variation; Ditaxis brasiliensis (Klotzsch) Baill.; Argythamnia brasiliensis (Klotzsch) Müll.Arg.

= Philyra brasiliensis =

Species of flowering plants

Philyra is a plant genus of the family Euphorbiaceae first described as a genus in 1841. It contains only one known species, Philyra brasiliensis, native to Brazil, Paraguay, and northeastern Argentina.
