= Cladogynos =

Scientific classification
- Kingdom: Plantae
- Clade: Tracheophytes
- Clade: Angiosperms
- Clade: Eudicots
- Clade: Rosids
- Order: Malpighiales
- Family: Euphorbiaceae
- Subfamily: Acalyphoideae
- Tribe: Epiprineae
- Subtribe: Epiprininae
- Genus: Cladogynos; Zipp. ex Span.
- Species: C. orientalis

Binomial name
- Cladogynos orientalis Zipp. ex Span.

Synonyms
- Adenogynum Rchb.f. & Zoll.; Baprea Pierre ex Pax & K.Hoffm.; Chloradenia Baill.; Cephalocroton orientalis (Zipp. ex Span.) Miq.; Conceveiba tomentosa Span.; Rottlera albicans Hassk.; Adenogynum discolor Rchb.f. & Zoll.; Chloradenia discolor (Rchb.f. & Zoll.) Baill.; Adenogynum odontophyllum Miq.; Cephalocroton discolor (Rchb.f. & Zoll.) Müll.Arg.; Adenochlaena siamensis Ridl.; Baprea bicolor Pierre ex Pax & K.Hoffm.; Cladogynos orientalis var. grossedentata Pax & K.Hoffm.; Cladogynos orientalis var. virens (Müll.Arg.) Pax & K.Hoffm.

Genus of flowering plants

Cladogynos is a genus of shrubs in the family Euphorbiaceae, first described as a genus in 1841. It contains only one known species, Cladogynos orientalis, native to Southeast Asia (Thailand, Vietnam, Cambodia, Malaysia, Indonesia, Philippines) and southern China (Guangxi Province).
