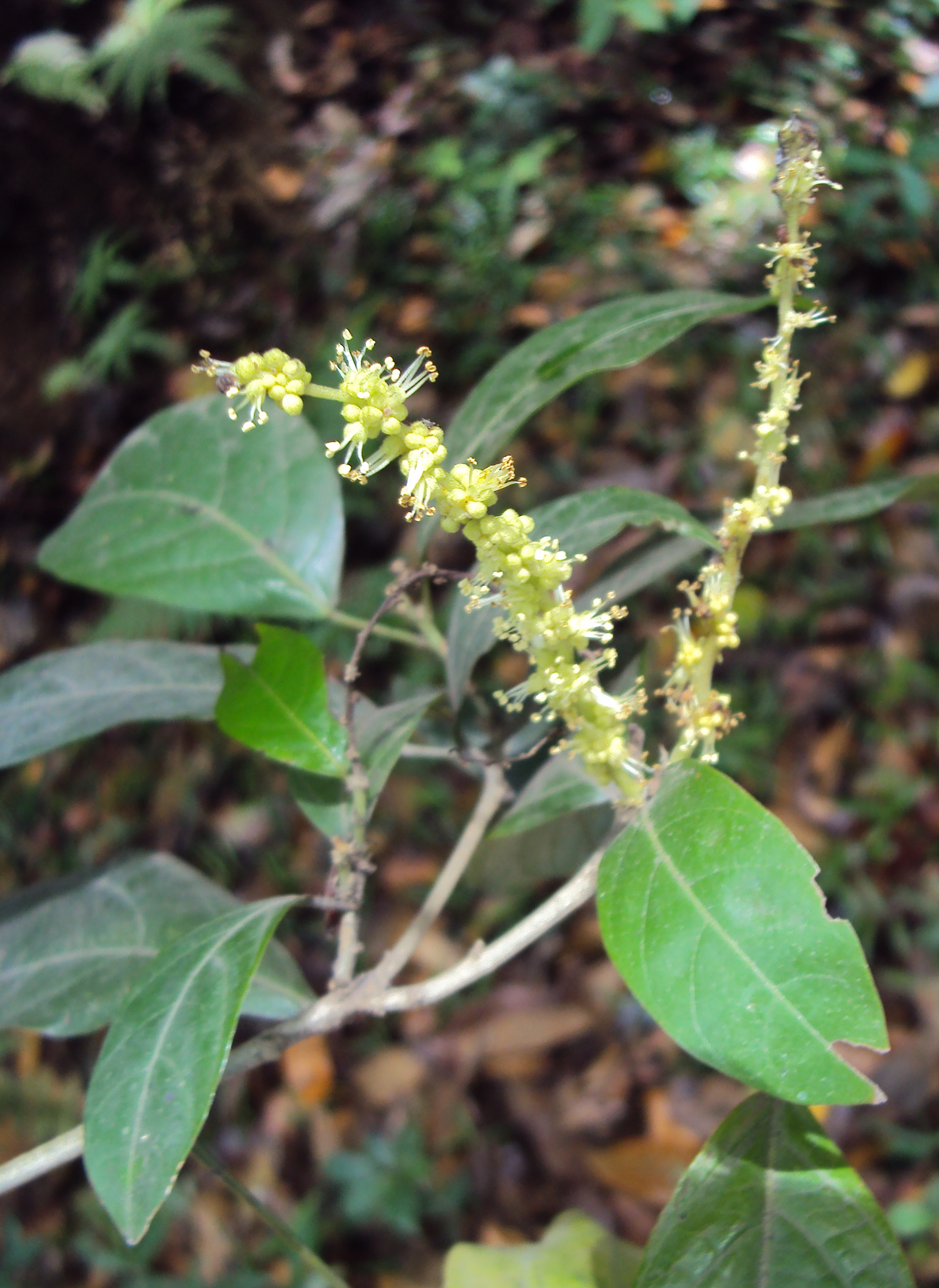
- Epiprinus mallotiformis

Scientific classification
- Kingdom: Plantae
- Clade: Tracheophytes
- Clade: Angiosperms
- Clade: Eudicots
- Clade: Rosids
- Order: Malpighiales
- Family: Euphorbiaceae
- Subfamily: Acalyphoideae
- Tribe: Epiprineae
- Subtribe: Epiprininae
- Genus: Epiprinus; Griff.

Synonyms
- Symphyllia Baill.

= Epiprinus =

Genus of flowering plants

Epiprinus is a genus of plant of the family Euphorbiaceae first described as a genus in 1854. It is native to Indochina, Sumatra, southern China, and the Indian subcontinent.

Species

1. Epiprinus balansae (Pax & K.Hoffm.) Gagnep. - Vietnam
2. Epiprinus lanceifolius Croizat - Vietnam
3. Epiprinus malayanus Griff. - Myanmar, Thailand, Peninsular Malaysia, Sumatra
4. Epiprinus mallotiformis (Müll.Arg.) Croizat - southern India
5. Epiprinus poilanei Gagnep. - Vietnam
6. Epiprinus siletianus (Baill.) Croizat - Hainan, Yunnan, Assam, Laos, Myanmar, Thailand, Vietnam
