= List of Euphorbiaceae genera =

Here is a full taxonomy of the family Euphorbiaceae, according to the most recent molecular research. This complex family previously comprised five subfamilies: the Acalyphoideae, the Crotonoideae, the Euphorbioideae, the Phyllanthoideae and the Oldfieldioideae. The first three are uni-ovulate families, and the last two are bi-ovulate.

Now the Euphorbiaceae has been split into five families: The three uni-ovulate subfamilies have become the Euphorbiaceae in the strict sense, with the tribe Galearieae in the Acalyphoideae forming most of the family Pandaceae. Part of the bi-ovulate subfamily Phyllanthoideae has become the family Phyllanthaceae, with the tribe Drypeteae as family Putranjivaceae. The other bi-ovulate subfamily Oldfieldioideae has become the Picrodendraceae. The genera Chaetocarpus, Clutia, Pera, Pogonophora, and Trigonopleura are now placed in family Peraceae.

Plants of the World Online places genus Phyllanoa in Euphorbiaceae. Hayden et al. place it in Violaceae.

== Subfamily Acalyphoideae ==
=== Tribe Acalypheae ===
There are 12 subtribes and 32 genera:

Subtribe Acalyphinae

Acalypha L. (synonyms Acalyphes, Acalyphopsis, Calyptrospatha, Caturus, Corythea, Cupameni, Galurus, Gymnalypha, Linostachys, Mercuriastrum, Odonteilema, Paracelsea, Ricinocarpus, Schizogyne, Usteria)

Subtribe Adrianinae

Adriana Gaudich. (synonyms Meialisa, Trachycaryon)

Subtribe Claoxylinae

Claoxylon A.Juss. (synonyms Erythrochilus, Erythrochylus)
Claoxylopsis Leandri
Discoclaoxylon (Müll.Arg.) Pax & K.Hoffm.
Erythrococca Benth. (synonyms Athroandra, Autrandra, Chloropatane, Deflersia, Poggeophyton, Rivinoides)
Micrococca Benth.

Subtribe Cleidiinae

Cleidion Blume (synonyms Lasiostyles, Psilostachys, Redia, Tetraglossa)
Sampantaea Airy Shaw
Wetria Baill. (synonyms Pseudotrewia)

Subtribe Dysopsidinae

Dysopsis Baill. (synonyms Mirabellia, Molina)

Subtribe Lasiococcinae

Clonostylis S.Moore
Homonoia Lour. (synonyms Haematospermum, Lumanaja)
Lasiococca Hook.f.
Spathiostemon Blume (synonym Polydragma)

Subtribe Lobaniliinae

Lobanilia Radcl.-Sm.

Subtribe Macaranginae

Macaranga Thouars (synonyms Adenoceras, Mappa, Mecostylis, Pachystemon, Panopia, Phocea, Tanarius)

Subtribe Mareyinae

Mareya Baill.
Mareyopsis Pax & K.Hoffm.

Subtribe Mercurialinae

Mercurialis L. (synonyms Cynocrambe, Discoplis, Synema)
Leidesia Müll.Arg.
Seidelia Baill.

Subtribe Ricininae

Ricinus L. - castor bean

Subtribe Rottlerinae

Avellanita Phil.
Hancea Seem. (synonyms Boutonia Bojer, Cordemoya Baill., Deuteromallotus Pax & K.Hoffm., Diplochlamys Müll.Arg.)
Mallotus Lour. (synonyms Aconceveibum, Axenfeldia, Coelodiscus, Diplochlamys, Echinocroton, Echinus, Hancea, Lasipana, Plagianthera, Rottlera,Stylanthus)
Rockinghamia Airy Shaw

=== Tribe Adelieae ===
There are 6 genera:

Adelia L. (synonym Ricinella)
Crotonogynopsis Pax
Enriquebeltrania Rzed. (synonym Beltrania)
Garciadelia Jestrow & Jiménez Rodr.
Lasiocroton Griseb.
Leucocroton Griseb.

=== Tribe Agrostistachydeae ===
There are 4 genera:

Agrostistachys Dalzell (synonyms Heterocalyx, Sarcoclinium)
Chondrostylis Boerl. (synonym Kunstlerodendron)
Cyttaranthus J.Léonard
Pseudagrostistachys Pax & K.Hoffm.

=== Tribe Alchorneae ===
There are 2 subtribes and 7 genera:

Subtribe Alchorneinae

Alchornea Sw. (synonyms Bleekeria, Cladodes, Hermesia, Lepidoturus, Schousboea, Stipellaria)
Aparisthmium Endl.
Aubletiana J.Murillo
Bocquillonia Baill. (synonym Ramelia)
Bossera Leandri
Orfilea Baill. (synonym Diderotia, Laurembergia)

Subtribe Conceveibinae

Conceveiba Aubl. (synonyms Conceveibastrum (Müll.Arg.) Pax & K.Hoffm. , Gavarretia Baill., Polyandra Leal, and Veconcibea (Müll.Arg.) Pax & K.Hoffm.)

=== Tribe Ampereae ===
There are 2 genera:

Amperea A.Juss. (synonym Leptomeria)
Monotaxis Brongn. (synonyms Hippocrepandra, Reissipa)

=== Tribe Bernardieae ===
There are 6 genera:

Adenophaedra (Müll.Arg.) Müll.Arg.
Afrotrewia Pax & K.Hoffm.
Amyrea Leandri
Bahiana J.F.Carrión
Bernardia Houst. ex Mill. (synonyms Alevia, Bernarda, Bernhardia, Bivonia, Passaea, Phaedra, Polyboea, Traganthus, Tyria)
Discocleidion Pax & K.Hoffm.
Necepsia Prain (synonyms Neopalissya, Palissya)
Paranecepsia Prain

=== Tribe Caryodendreae ===
There are 3 genera:

Alchorneopsis Müll.Arg.
Caryodendron H.Karst. (synonym Centrodiscus)
Discoglypremna Prain

=== Tribe Cheiloseae ===
There are 2 genera:

Cheilosa Blume
Neoscortechinia Pax (synonym Alcineanthus, Scortechinia)

=== Tribe Chrozophoreae ===
This tribe has 4 subtribes and 12 genera:

Subtribe Chrozophorinae

Chrozophora Neck. ex A.Juss. (synonyms Crossophora, Crozophora, Ricinoides, Tournesol, Tournesolia)

Subtribe Ditaxinae

Argythamnia P.Browne (synonyms Argithamnia, Argothamnia, Argyrothamnia, Argytamnia, Aphora Nutt., Ditaxis Vahl ex A.Juss., Odotalon Raf., Paxia Herter, Paxiuscula Herter, Serophyton Benth., Stenonia Didr.)
Caperonia A.St.-Hil. (synonyms Acanthopyxis, Androphoranthus, Cavanilla, Lepidococea, Meterana)
Chiropetalum A.Juss. (synonyms Aonikena, Desfontaena, Desfontaina, Desfontainea)
Philyra Klotzsch (synonym Phyllera)

Subtribe Doryxylinae

Doryxylon Zoll. (synonyms Mercadoa, Sumbavia)
Melanolepis Rchb.f. & Zoll.
Sumbaviopsis J.J.Sm. (synonyms Adisa, Adisca)
Thyrsanthera Pierre ex Gagnep.

Subtribe Speranskiinae

Speranskia Baill.

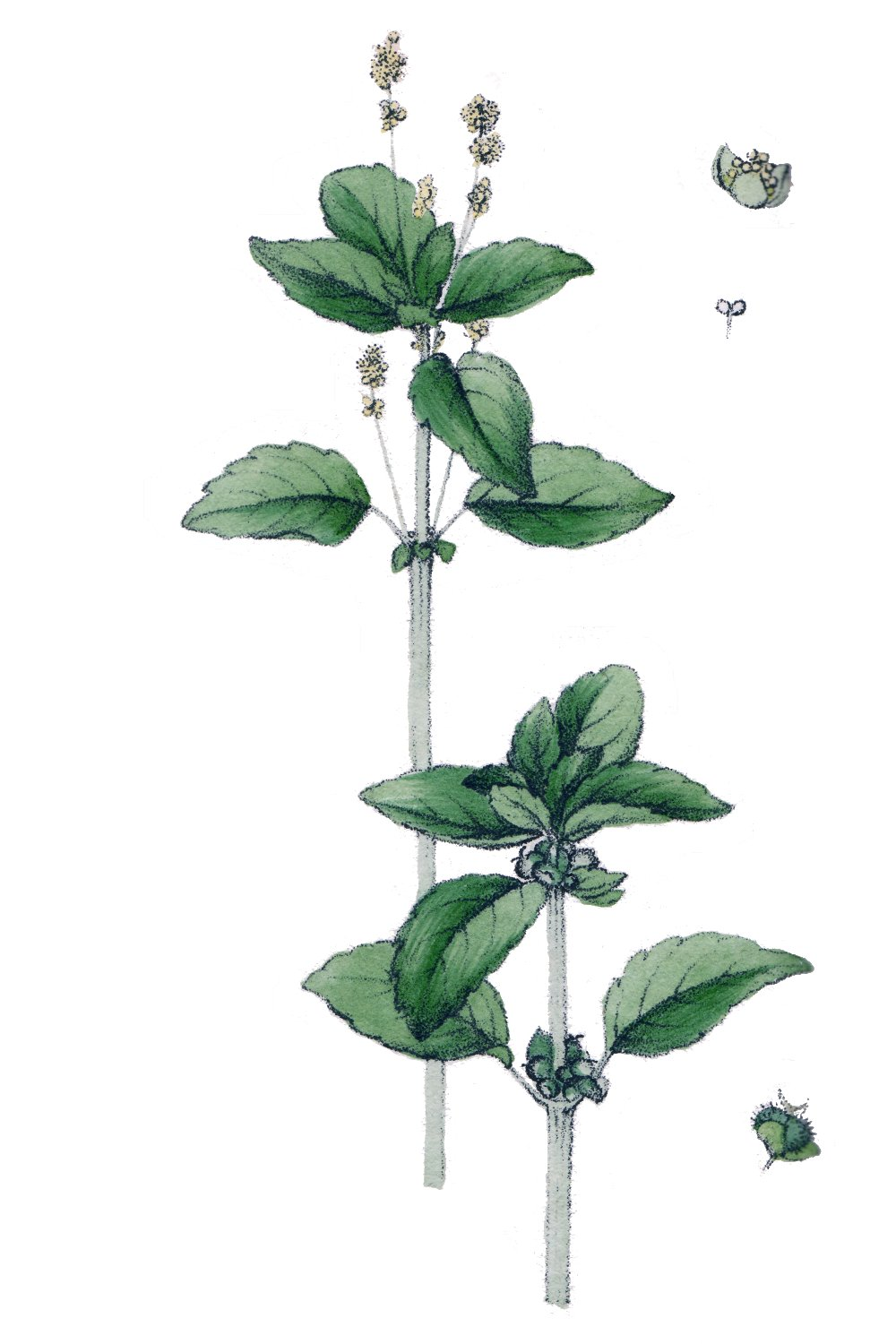
Annual Mercury (Mercurialis annua)

=== Tribe Dicoelieae ===
This tribe has one genus:

Dicoelia Benth.

=== Tribe Epiprineae ===
There are 2 subtribes and 9 genera:

Subtribe Epiprininae

Adenochlaena Boivin ex Baill. (synonyms Niedenzua, Centrostylis)
Cephalocroton Hochst.
Cephalocrotonopsis Pax
Cladogynos Zipp. ex Span. (synonyms Adenogynum, Baprea, Chloradenia)
Cleidiocarpon Airy Shaw (synonym Sinopimelodendron)
Epiprinus Griff.
Koilodepas Hassk. (synonyms Caelodepas, Calpigyne, Coelodepas, Nephrostylus)
Tsaiodendron Y.H.Tan, H.Zhu & H.Sun

Subtribe Cephalomappinae

Cephalomappa Baill. (synonym Muricococcum Chun & F.C.How)

=== Tribe Erismantheae ===
There are 3 genera:

Erismanthus Wall. ex Müll.Arg.
Moultonianthus Merr.
Syndyophyllum K.Schum. & Lauterb.

=== Tribe Omphaleae ===
This tribe only has 1 genus:

Omphalea L. (synonyms Duchola, Hebecocca, Hecatea, Neomphalea, Omphalandria, Ronnowia)

=== Tribe Plukenetieae ===
There are 3 subtribes and 18 genera:

Subtribe Dalechampiinae

Dalechampia Plum. ex L. (synonyms Cremophyllum, Dalechampsia, Megalostylis, Rhopalostylis)

Subtribe Plukenetiinae

Angostylis Benth. (synonym Angostyles)
Astrococcus Benth.
Haematostemon Pax & K.Hoffm.
Plukenetia L. (synonyms Accia, Angostylidium, Apopandra, Botryanthe, Ceratococcus, Elaeophora, Eleutherostigma, Fragariopsis, Hedraiostylus, Pseudotragia, Pterococcus, Sajorium, Tetracarpidium or Vigia)
Romanoa Trevis. (synonyms Anabaena, Anabaenella)

Subtribe Tragiinae

Acidoton Sw. (synonym Durandeeldia Kuntze)
Bia Klotzsch
Chicomendes W.Cordeiro & M.F.Sales
Cnesmone Blume (synonyms Cenesmon, Cnesmosa)
Gitara Pax & K.Hoffm.
Megistostigma Hook.f. (synonym Clavistylus)
Monadelpha L.J.Gillespie & Card.-McTeag.
Pachystylidium Pax & K.Hoffm.
Platygyna P.Mercier (synonym Acanthocaulon)
Sphaerostylis Baill.
Tragia Plum. ex L. (synonyms Agirta, Allosandra, Ctenomeria, Lassia, Leptobotrys, Leptorhachis, Leucandra, Schorigeram)
Tragiella Pax & K.Hoffm.
Zuckertia Baill.

=== Tribe Pycnocomeae ===
There are 2 subtribes and 7 genera:

Subtribe Blumeodendrinae

Blumeodendron (Müll.Arg.) Kurz
Botryophora Hook.f. (synonyms Botryospora, Botryphora)
Podadenia Thwaites
Ptychopyxis Miq. (synonym Clarorivinia)

Subtribe Pycnocominae

Argomuellera Pax (synonyms Neopycnocoma, Wetriaria)
Droceloncia J.Léonard
Pycnocoma Benth. (synonym Comopyena)

=== Tribe Sphyranthereae ===
There is only 1 genus:

Sphyranthera Hook.f.

== Subfamily Crotonoideae ==
=== Tribe Adenoclineae ===
There are 2 subtribes and 6 genera:

Subtribe Adenoclininae

Adenocline Turcz. (synonyms Adenoclina, Diplostylis, Paradenocline)
Ditta Griseb.
Glycydendron Ducke
Klaineanthus Pierre ex Prain
Tetrorchidium Poepp. (synonyms Hasskarlia, Tetrorchidiopsis)

Subtribe Endosperminae

Endospermum Benth. (synonym Capellenia)

=== Tribe Aleuritideae ===
This tribe has 6 subtribes and 14 genera:

Subtribe Aleuritinae

Aleurites J.R.Forst. & G.Forst. (synonym Camirium)
Reutealis Airy Shaw
Vernicia Lour. (synonyms Ambinux, Dryandra, Elaeococca)

Subtribe Benoistiinae

Benoistia H.Perrier & Leandri

Subtribe Crotonogyninae

Crotonogyne Müll.Arg. (synonym Neomanniophyton)
Cyrtogonone Prain
Manniophyton Müll.Arg.

Subtribe Garciinae

Garcia Vahl ex Rohr (synonym Carcia)

Subtribe Grosserinae

Cavacoa J.Léonard
Grossera Pax
Karima Cheek & Riina
Sandwithia Lanj.
Tannodia Baill. (synonyms Domohinea Leandri, Holstia Pax, Neoholstia Rauschert, Tandonia Baill.)
Tapoides Airy Shaw

Subtribe Neoboutoniinae

Neoboutonia Müll.Arg.

=== Tribe Codiaeae ===
There are 15 genera:

Acidocroton Griseb.
Baliospermum Blume
Baloghia Endl. (synonym Steigeria)
Blachia Baill. (synonym Deonia)
Codiaeum Rumph. ex A.Juss. (synonyms Crozophyla, Junghuhnia, Phyllaurea, Synaspisma)
Colobocarpos Esser & Welzen
Dodecastigma Ducke
Fontainea Heckel
Hylandia Airy Shaw
Ophellantha Standl.
Ostodes Blume
Pantadenia Gagnep.
Pausandra Radlk.
Sagotia Baill.
Strophioblachia Boerl.
Tritaxis Baill. (synonym Dimorphocalyx Thwaites)

=== Tribe Crotoneae ===
There are 6 genera:

Astraea Klotzsch
Brasiliocroton P.E.Berry & Cordeiro
Croton L. (synonyms Agelandra, Aldinia, Angelandra, Anisepta, Anisophyllum, Argyra, Argyrodendron, Astraea, Astrogyne, Aubertia, Banalia, Barhamia, Brachystachys, Calypteriopetalon, Cascarilla, Centrandra, Cieca, Cleodora, Codonocalyx, Comatocroton, Crotonanthus, Crotonopsis, Cubacroton Alain, Cyclostigma, Decarinium, Drepadenium, Eluteria, Engelmannia, Eremocarpus, Eutrophia, Friesia, Furcaria, Geiseleria, Gynamblosis, Halecus, Hendecandas, Heptallon, Heterochlamys, Heterocroton, Julocroton, Klotzschiphytum, Kurkas, Lasiogyne, Leptemon, Leucadenia, Luntia, Macrocroton, Medea, Merleta, Moacroton Croizat, Monguia, Myriogomphus, Ocalia, Oxydectes, Palanostigma, Penteca, Pilinophyton, Piscaria, Pleopadium, Podostachys, Saipania, Schradera, Semilta, Tiglium, Timandra, Tridesmis, Triplandra, Vandera)
Mildbraedia Pax (synonyms Neojatropha, Plesiatropha)
Paracroton Miq. (synonyms Desmostemon, Fahrenheitia)
Radcliffea Petra Hoffm. & K.Wurdack

=== Tribe Elateriospermeae ===
This tribe only has 1 genus:

Elateriospermum Blume (synonyms Elaterioides, Elaterispermum)

=== Tribe Gelonieae ===
This tribe has 2 genera:

Cladogelonium Leandri
Suregada Roxb. ex Rottler (synonyms Ceratophorus, Erythrocarpus, Gelonium, Owataria)

=== Tribe Jatropheae ===
There are 8 genera:

Annesijoa Pax & K.Hoffm.
Chlamydojatropha Pax & K.Hoffm.
Deutzianthus Gagnep. (synonym Loerzingia Airy Shaw)
Jatropha L. (synonyms Adenorhopium, Adenoropium, Castiglionia, Collenucia, Curcas, Jatropa, Loureira, Mesandrinia, Mozinna, Zimapania)
Joannesia Vell. (synonyms Anda, Andicus)
Leeuwenbergia Letouzey & N.Hallé
Oligoceras Gagnep.
Vaupesia R.E.Schult.

=== Tribe Manihoteae ===
This tribe has 2 genera:

Cnidoscolus Pohl (synonyms Bivonea, Jussieuia, Mandioca, Victorinia)
Manihot Mill. (synonyms Hotnima, Janipha, Manihotoides)

=== Tribe Micrandreae ===
There are 2 subtribes and 3 genera:

Subtribe Heveinae

Hevea Aubl. (synonyms Caoutchoua J.F.Gmel., Micrandra R.Br., Siphonanthus Schreb. ex Baill., Siphonia Rich.)

Subtribe Micrandrinae

Micrandra Benth. (synonyms Clusiophyllum Müll.Arg., Cunuria Baill. Pogonophyllum Didr.)
Micrandropsis W.A.Rodrigues

=== Tribe Ricinocarpeae ===
There are 2 subtribes and 7 genera:

Subtribe Bertyinae

Bertya Planch. (synonym Lambertya)
Borneodendron Airy Shaw
Cocconerion Baill.
Myricanthe Airy Shaw

Subtribe Ricinocarpinae

Alphandia Baill.
Beyeria Miq. (synonyms Beyeriopsis, Calyptrostigma, Clavipodium)
Ricinocarpos Desf. (synonyms Echinosphaera, Ricinocarpus, Roeperia)
Shonia R.J.F.Hend. & Halford

Unplaced to subtribe

Weda Welzen

=== Tribe Ricinodendreae ===
There are 3 genera:

Givotia Griff.
Ricinodendron Müll.Arg.
Schinziophyton Hutch. ex Radcl.Sm.

=== Tribe Trigonostemoneae ===
There is only 1 genus:

Trigonostemon Blume (synonyms Actephilopsis, Athroisma, Enchidium, Kurziodendron, Neotrigonostemon, Nepenthandra, Poilaniella, Prosartema, Silvaea, Telogyne, Tylosepalum)
Tritaxis Baill.

== Subfamily Euphorbioideae ==
=== Tribe Euphorbieae ===
This tribe has 3 subtribes and 6 genera:

Subtribe Anthosteminae

Anthostema A.Juss.
Dichostemma Pierre

Subtribe Euphorbiinae

Euphorbia L. (synonyms Ademo, Adenopetalum, Adenorima, Agaloma, Aklema, Alectoroctonum, Allobia, Anisophyllum, Anthacantha, Aplarina, Arthrothamnus, Bojeria, Ceraselma, Chamaesyce, Characias, Chylogala, Crepidaria, Ctenadena, Cubanthus Millsp. Cyathophora, Cystidospermum, Dactylanthes, Dematra, Desmonema, Diadenaria, Dichrophyllum, Dichylium, Diplocyathium, Ditritra, Elaeophorbia, Endadenium, Endoisila, Epurga, Esula, Euforbia, Eumecanthus, Euphorbiastrum, Euphorbiodendron, Euphorbiopsis, Euphorbium, Galarhoeus, Hexadenia, Kanopikon, Kobiosis, Lacanthis, Lathyris, Lepadena, Leptopus, Lophobios, Lortia, Lyciopsis, Medusea, Monadenium, Nisomenes, Ossifraga, Peccana, Pedilanthus, Petalandra, Pleuradena, Poinsettia, Pythius, Sclerocyathium, Stenadenium, Sterigmanthe, Synadenium, Tithymaloides, Tithymalopsis, Tithymalus, Torfasadis, Treisia, Tricherostigma, Trichosterigma, Tumalis, Vallaris, Ventenatia, Xamesike, Zalitea, Zygophyllidium)

Subtribe Neoguillauminiinae

Calycopeplus Planch.
Neoguillauminia Croizat

=== Tribe Hippomaneae ===
This tribe has 2 subtribes and 33 genera:

Gradyana Athiê-Souza, A.L.Melo & M.F.Sales
Incadendron K.Wurdack & Farfán

Subtribe Carumbiinae

Homalanthus A.Juss. (synonyms Carumbium, Dibrachion, Dibrachium, Duania, Wartmannia)

Subtribe Hippomaninae

Actinostemon Mart. ex Klotzsch (synonym Dactylostemon)
Adenopeltis Bertero ex A.Juss.
Anomostachys (Baill.) Hurus.
Balakata Esser
Bonania A.Rich. (synonym Hypocoton)
Colliguaja Molina
Conosapium Müll.Arg.
Dalembertia Baill. (synonym Alcoceria)
Dendrocousinsia Millsp.
Dendrothrix Esser
Ditrysinia Raf.
Excoecaria L. (synonyms Commia, Glyphostylus)
Falconeria Royle
Grimmeodendron Urb.
Gymnanthes Sw. (synonyms Adenogyne, Ateramnus, Duvigneaudia J.Léonard)
Hippomane L. (synonyms Mancanilla, Mancinella)
Mabea Aubl.
Maprounea Aubl. (synonyms Aegopicron, Aegopricon, Aegopricum)
Microstachys A.Juss.
Neoshirakia Esser (synonym Shirakia)
Pleradenophora Esser
Pseudosenefeldera Esser
Rhodothyrsus Esser
Sapium Jacq. (synonyms Carumbium, Gymnobothrys, Sapiopsis, Seborium, Shirakiopsis, Stillingfleetia, Taeniosapium)
Sclerocroton Hochst.
Sebastiania Spreng. (synonyms Clonostachys, Cnemidostachys, Elachocroton, Gussonia, Microstachys, Sarothrostachys, Tragiopsis)
Senefeldera Mart.
Senefelderopsis Steyerm.
Shirakiopsis Esser
Spegazziniophytum Esser
Spirostachys Sond.
Stillingia L. (synonyms Gymnostillingia)
Triadica Lour.

=== Tribe Hureae ===
There are 4 genera:

Algernonia Baill. (synonyms Dendrobryon Klotzsch ex Pax, Tetraplandra Baill.)
Hura L.
Ophthalmoblapton Allemão

=== Tribe Pachystromateae ===
There is one genus:

Pachystroma Müll.Arg. (synonym Acantholoma)

=== Tribe Stomatocalyceae ===
There are 2 subtribes and 4 genera:

Subtribe Hamilcoinae

Hamilcoa Prain
Nealchornea Huber

Subtribe Stomatocalycinae

Pimelodendron Hassk. (synonym Stomatocalyx)
Plagiostyles Pierre

== See also ==
- Cultivated plant taxonomy
- Taxonomy of the Phyllanthaceae
- Taxonomy of the Picrodendraceae
