= Monotaxis =

Monotaxis is the generic name of two groups of organisms. It can refer to:

- Monotaxis (fish), a genus of fish in the family Lethrinidae
- Monotaxis (plant), a genus of plants in the family Euphorbiaceae
- Monotaxis, a genus of moths in the family Geometridae; synonym of Monostoecha
