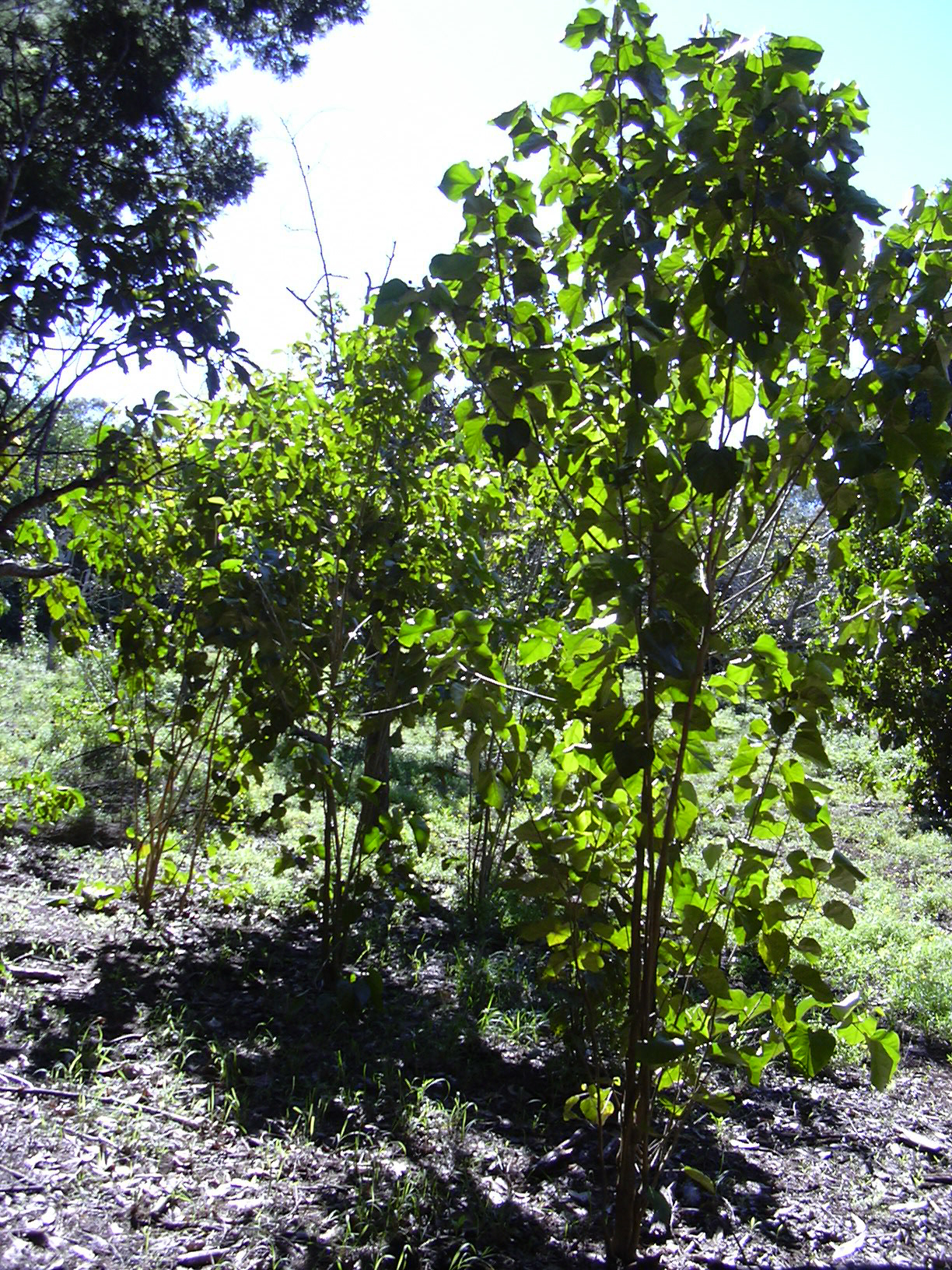
- Croton guatemalensis

Scientific classification
- Kingdom: Plantae
- Clade: Tracheophytes
- Clade: Angiosperms
- Clade: Eudicots
- Clade: Rosids
- Order: Malpighiales
- Family: Euphorbiaceae
- Subfamily: Crotonoideae
- Tribe: Crotoneae; Dumort.

Genera
- See text

= Crotoneae =

Tribe of flowering plants

Crotoneae is a tribe of the subfamily Crotonoideae, under the family Euphorbiaceae.

== Genera ==
The following genera are valid:

1. Astraea - Americas (introduced Africa and India)
2. Brasiliocroton - Brazil (2 spp.)
3. Croton (synonym Moacroton) - widespread (especially tropics and S. hemisphere)
4. Mildbraedia - Africa
5. Paracroton - Asia

== See also ==
- Taxonomy of the Euphorbiaceae
