= Pseudagrostistachys africana =

Conservation status
- Vulnerable (IUCN 3.1)

Scientific classification
- Kingdom: Plantae
- Clade: Tracheophytes
- Clade: Angiosperms
- Clade: Eudicots
- Clade: Rosids
- Order: Malpighiales
- Family: Euphorbiaceae
- Genus: Pseudagrostistachys
- Species: P. africana

Binomial name
- Pseudagrostistachys africana (Müll.Arg.) Pax & K.Hoffm.

Species of flowering plant

Pseudagrostistachys africana is a species of plant in the family Euphorbiaceae. It is found in Cameroon, Equatorial Guinea, Ghana, Nigeria, and São Tomé and Príncipe. It is threatened by habitat loss.
