= Podadenia =

Scientific classification
- Kingdom: Plantae
- Clade: Tracheophytes
- Clade: Angiosperms
- Clade: Eudicots
- Clade: Rosids
- Order: Malpighiales
- Family: Euphorbiaceae
- Subfamily: Acalyphoideae
- Tribe: Pycnocomeae
- Subtribe: Blumeodendrinae
- Genus: Podadenia; Thwaites
- Species: P. sapida

Binomial name
- Podadenia sapida Thwaites

Synonyms
- Stylanthus thwaitesii Baill.; Podadenia thwaitesii Müll.Arg.; Ptychopyxis thwaitesii (Müll.Arg.) Croizat

Genus of plants

Podadenia is a genus of plant of the family Euphorbiaceae first described as a genus in 1821. At present, only species is recognized in the genus, Podadenia sapida, endemic to Sri Lanka.

formerly included

moved to Ptychopyxis

- Podadenia javanica J.J.Sm., synonym of Ptychopyxis javanica (J.J.Sm.) Croizat
