= Erismantheae =

Scientific classification
- Kingdom: Plantae
- Clade: Tracheophytes
- Clade: Angiosperms
- Clade: Eudicots
- Clade: Rosids
- Order: Malpighiales
- Family: Euphorbiaceae
- Subfamily: Acalyphoideae
- Tribe: Erismantheae

Genera
- Erismanthus; Moultonianthus; Syndyophyllum

Tribe of flowering plants

Erismantheae is a tribe of plant of the family Euphorbiaceae. It comprises 3 genera.

== See also ==
- Taxonomy of the Euphorbiaceae
