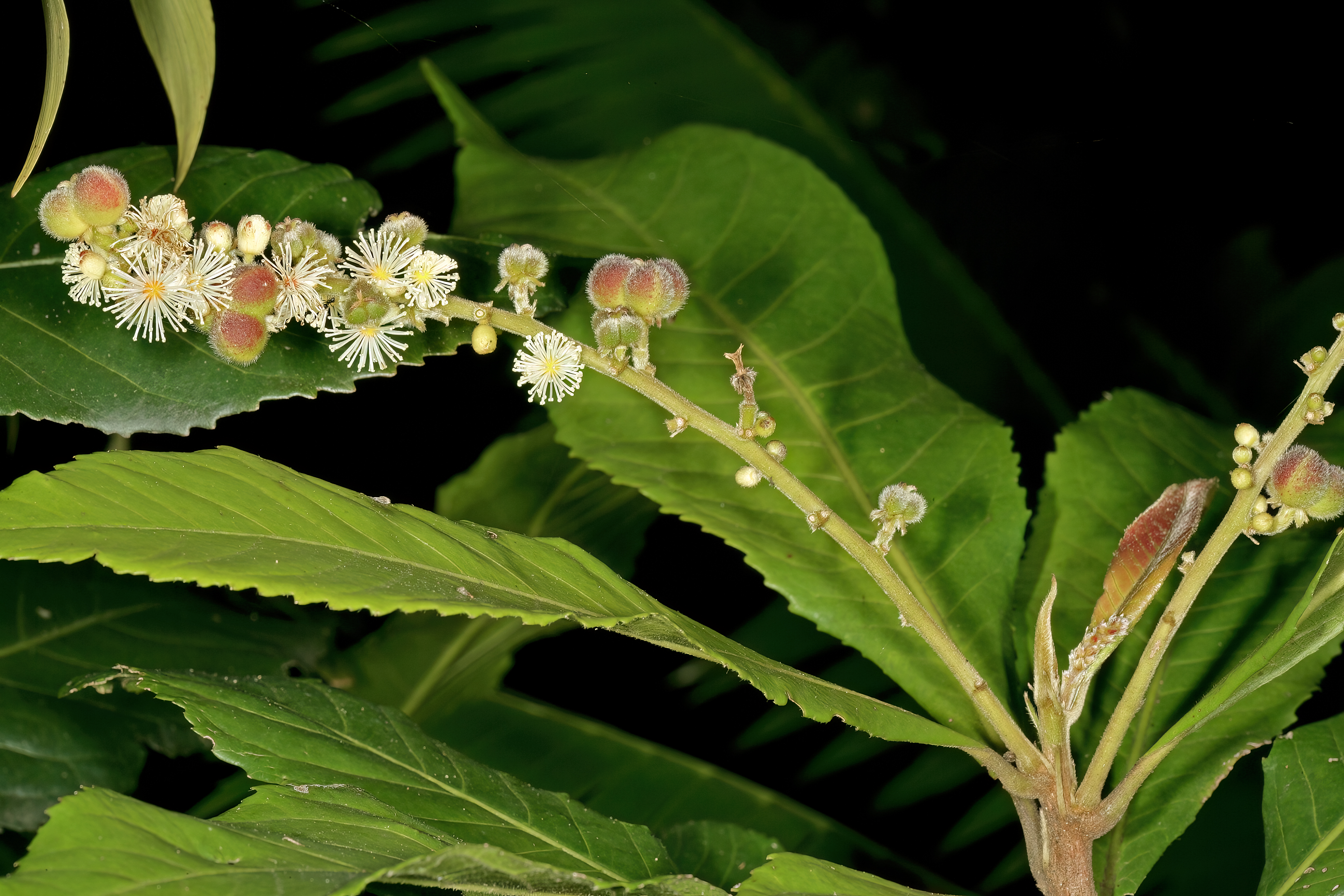
- Argomuellera macrophylla at Lowveld National Botanical Garden, South Africa

Scientific classification
- Kingdom: Plantae
- Clade: Tracheophytes
- Clade: Angiosperms
- Clade: Eudicots
- Clade: Rosids
- Order: Malpighiales
- Family: Euphorbiaceae
- Subfamily: Acalyphoideae
- Tribe: Pycnocomeae
- Subtribe: Pycnocominae
- Genus: Argomuellera; Pax

Type species
- Argomuellera macrophylla Pax

Synonyms
- Neopycnocoma Pax; Wetriaria Pax (Note: This genus name is one anagram from Trewia, another genus of Euphorbiaceae.)

= Argomuellera =

Genus of flowering plants in the spurge family

Argomuellera is a genus of plant of the family Euphorbiaceae first described as a genus in 1894. It is native to sub-Saharan Africa, Madagascar, and the Comoros Islands.

Species

1. Argomuellera basicordata Peter ex Radcl.-Sm. - Lushoto
2. Argomuellera calcicola (Leandri) J.Léonard - Madagascar
3. Argomuellera danguyana (Leandri) J.Léonard - Madagascar
4. Argomuellera decaryana (Leandri) J.Léonard - Madagascar
5. Argomuellera gigantea (Baill.) Pax & K.Hoffm. - Nosy Be Island
6. Argomuellera lancifolia (Pax) Pax - Equatorial Guinea, Gabon
7. Argomuellera macrophylla Pax - tropical Africa
8. Argomuellera perrieri (Leandri) J.Léonard - Madagascar
9. Argomuellera pierlotiana J.Léonard - Zaïre
10. Argomuellera pumila McPherson - Madagascar
11. Argomuellera sessilifolia Prain - Congo
12. Argomuellera trewioides (Baill.) Pax & K.Hoffm. - Comoros

Formerly included

moved to Droceloncia or Pycnocoma

- Argomuellera reticulata - Pycnocoma reticulata
- Argomuellera rigidifolia - Droceloncia rigidifolia
