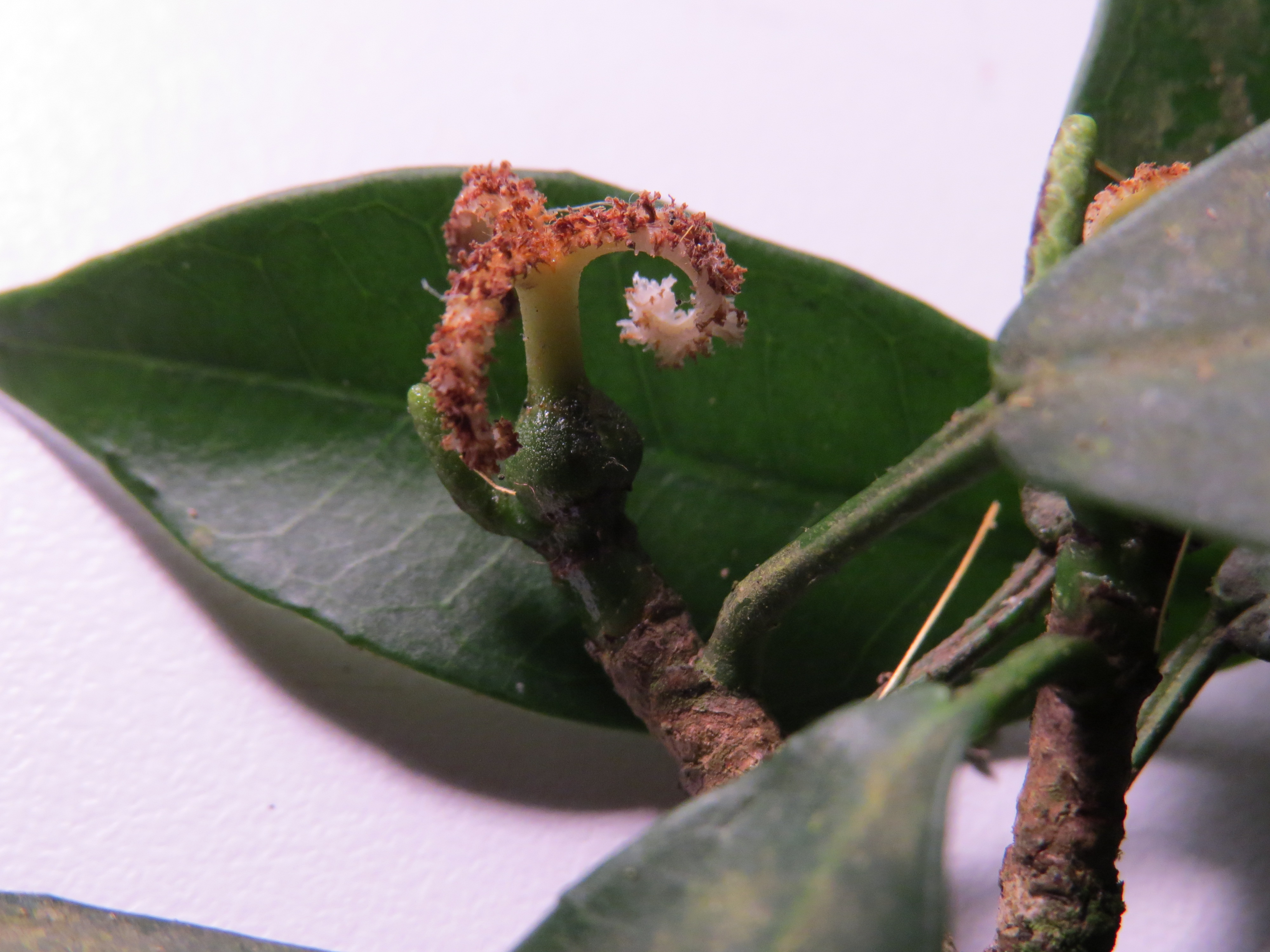

Conservation status
- Least Concern (IUCN 3.1)

Scientific classification
- Kingdom: Plantae
- Clade: Tracheophytes
- Clade: Angiosperms
- Clade: Eudicots
- Clade: Rosids
- Order: Malpighiales
- Family: Euphorbiaceae
- Genus: Algernonia
- Species: A. leandrii

Binomial name
- Algernonia leandrii (Baill.) G.L.Webster

Synonyms
- Tetraplandra leandrii

= Algernonia leandrii =

Species of tree

Algernonia leandrii is a species of tree endemic to Brazil. It goes by the common name cega-bobo in Portuguese. The tree can grow up to 15 meters in height.
