= Erismanthus =

Scientific classification
- Kingdom: Plantae
- Clade: Tracheophytes
- Clade: Angiosperms
- Clade: Eudicots
- Clade: Rosids
- Order: Malpighiales
- Family: Euphorbiaceae
- Subfamily: Acalyphoideae
- Tribe: Erismantheae
- Genus: Erismanthus; Wall. ex Müll.Arg.

Type species
- Erismanthus obliquus Wall. ex Müll.Arg.

Genus of flowering plants

Erismanthus is a plant genus of the family Euphorbiaceae first described as a genus in 1866. It is native to Southeast Asia and southern China.

Species

1. Erismanthus obliquus Wall. ex Müll.Arg. - S Thailand, Malaysia, Borneo, Sumatra
2. Erismanthus sinensis Oliv. - Cambodia, Laos, Thailand, Vietnam, Hainan

formerly included

Erismanthus leembruggianus Boerl. & Koord., synonym of Moultonianthus leembruggianus (Boerl. & Koord.) Steenis
