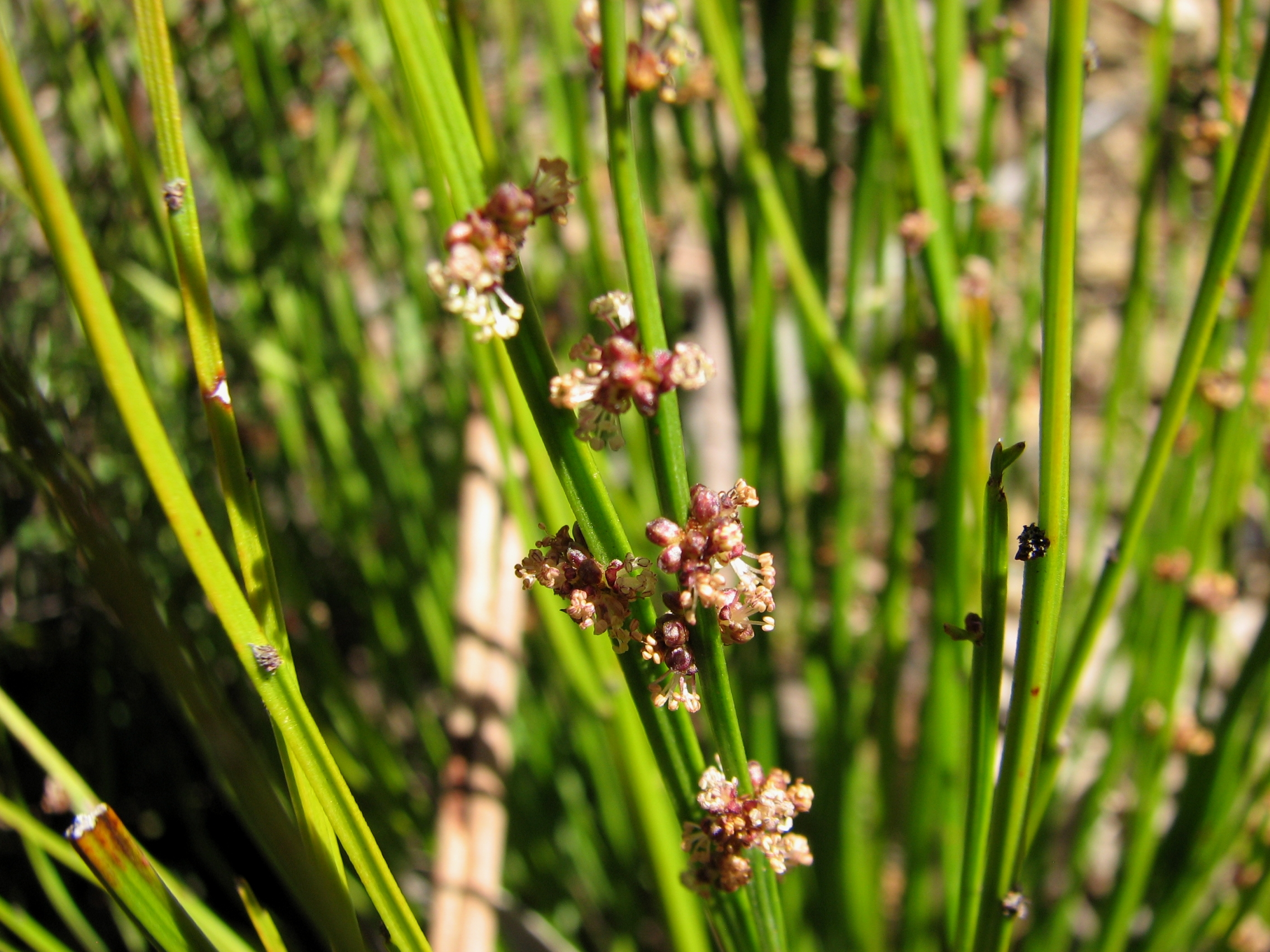

Scientific classification
- Kingdom: Plantae
- Clade: Tracheophytes
- Clade: Angiosperms
- Clade: Eudicots
- Clade: Rosids
- Order: Malpighiales
- Family: Euphorbiaceae
- Genus: Amperea
- Species: A. xiphoclada

Binomial name
- Amperea xiphoclada (Sieber ex Spreng.) Druce

Synonyms
- Leptomeria brownii Miq. Leptomeria xiphoclada Sieber ex Spreng.

= Amperea xiphoclada =

Species of plant

Ampera xiphloclada, commonly known as ‘broom spurge’, is a grass-like erect shrub in the Euphorbiaceae family.

== Description ==
The smooth relatively thin branched, erect shrub is often lime green with dull, light brown sessile clustered flowers.

=== Leaves and stems ===
What appear to be long leaves like a monocot grass clump, the erect structures are instead glabrous stems, smooth and mainly hairless. This plant is almost leafless. During its flowering life stage, it is completely leafless, likely to put more energy into reproduction.

=== Flowers ===
Flowering occurs sectionally along the glabrous stem typically from September to February, dependent on the season. Flowers occur in sessile clusters (inflorescence) or with pedicels (part of the stalk that helps the cluster). As this species is mainly dioecious, the male and female flowers remain separate and are found on different individuals, rather than one plant having hermaphrodite flowers.

=== Reproduction and fruit ===
The fruit is small with three sections in the 2-4mm capsule, which contains the 1.5-2.5mm long, shiny black ovoid seeds.

== Distribution ==
Ampera xipholoclada is found throughout Australia’s eastern and southern coastal areas and inland ranges, as well as much of Tasmania. Distribution and populations are relatively stable.

=== Habitat ===
This species is found in woodland, forest, and shrub (also known as heath areas in Australia) habitats. Ampera sp. prefers, a dry place, or by moist well-drained soils.

== Uses and planting ==
Plants in the Euphorbiaceae family have diverse uses, but must be treated with caution as a large proportion of species are toxic, either in the seeds or in the flesh of stems. However, some species can be used as a source of rubber, fruit, dyes and have traditionally been used for medicinal purposes.

Ampera xiphloclada can be used for ground coverage and as an understory plant, and when given access to sunlight it can create a hedge-like feature.
