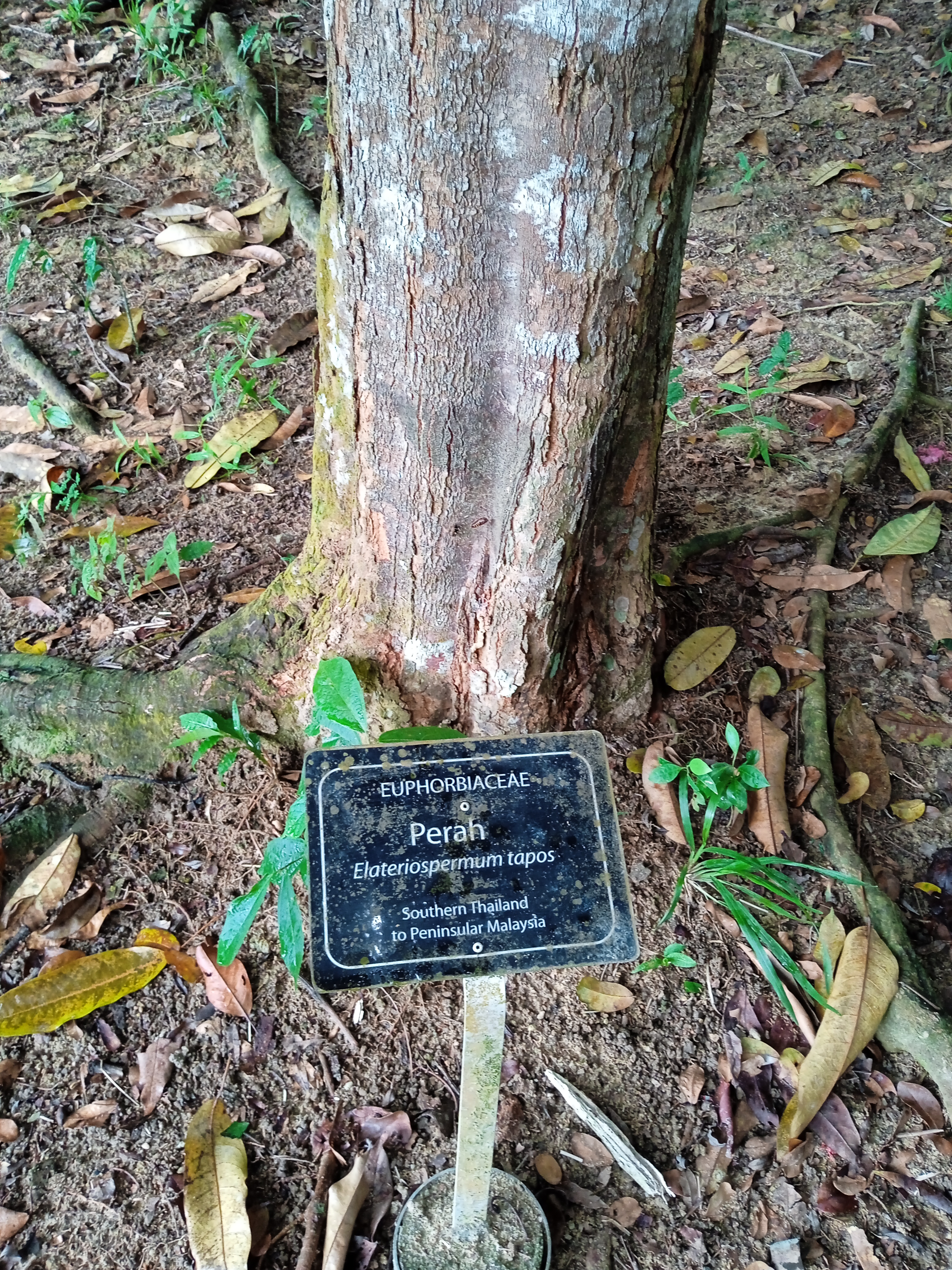
- At Kepong Botanical Garden, Kuala Lumpur

Scientific classification
- Kingdom: Plantae
- Clade: Embryophytes
- Clade: Tracheophytes
- Clade: Angiosperms
- Clade: Eudicots
- Clade: Rosids
- Order: Malpighiales
- Family: Euphorbiaceae
- Subfamily: Crotonoideae
- Tribe: Elateriospermeae; G.L.Webster
- Genus: Elateriospermum; Blume
- Species: E. tapos

Binomial name
- Elateriospermum tapos Blume

Synonyms
- Genus: Elateriodes Kuntze; Species: Elateriospermum rhizophorum Boerl. & Koord.

= Elateriospermum =

Genus of flowering plants

Elateriospermum is a monotypic plant genus in the family Euphorbiaceae. The genus is the only member of tribe Elateriospermeae and contains a single species, Elateriospermum tapos. It is found in Southern Thailand, Peninsular Malaysia, Borneo, Java, and Sumatra. It is known locally as buah perah or perah tree.

This plant (Thai: กระ; kra) is mentioned in Thai literature.

In folklore, it is said to have been used during conflicts as the burning of its wood is said to produce little or no smoke thus not alerting enemies to one's position.

Formerly included in genus *unknown*,

moved to Blumeodendron

- Elateriospermum paucinervium Elmer - Blumeodendron tokbrai
- Elateriospermum tokbrai Blume - Blumeodendron tokbrai
