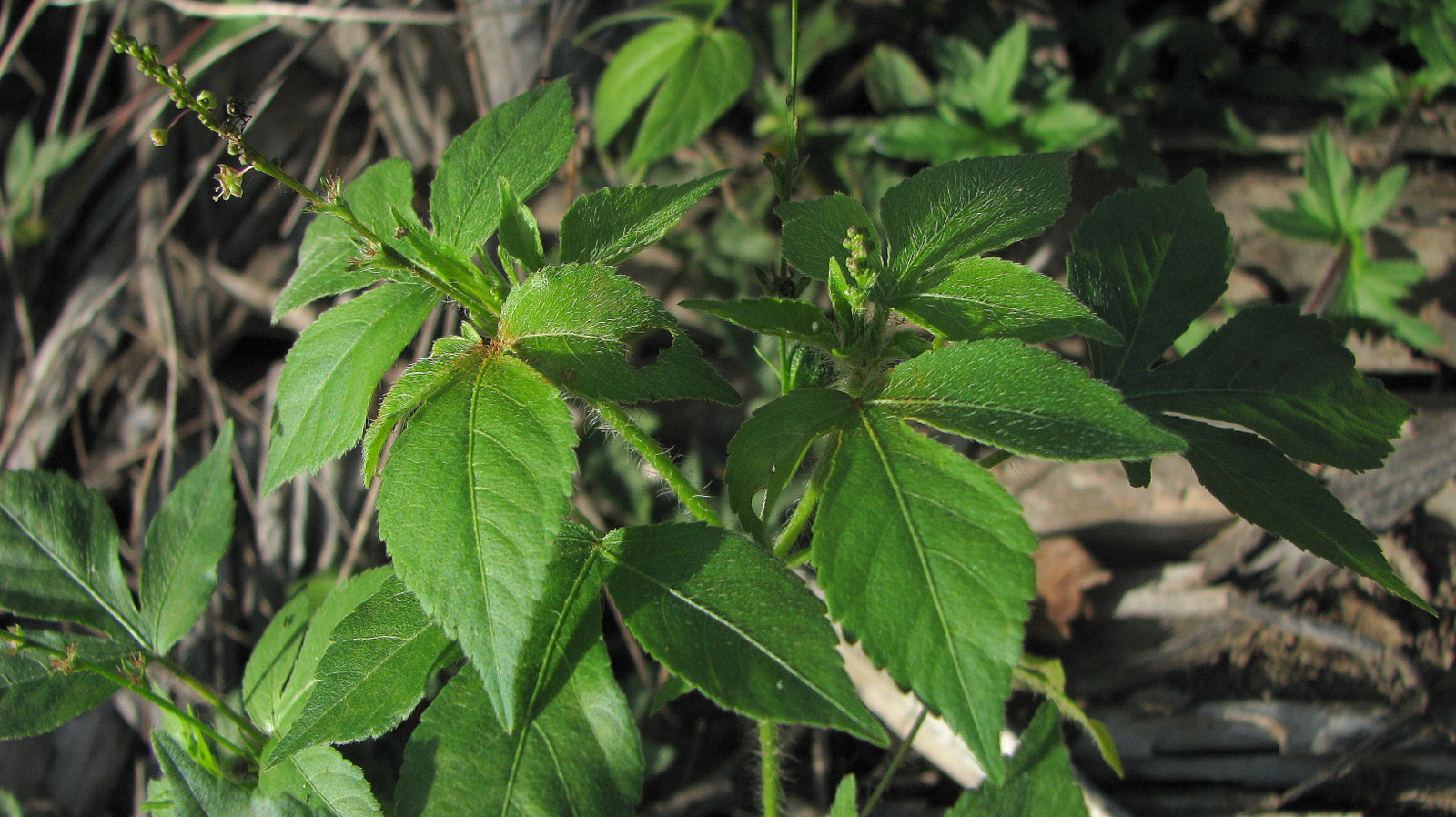

Scientific classification
- Kingdom: Plantae
- Clade: Tracheophytes
- Clade: Angiosperms
- Clade: Eudicots
- Clade: Rosids
- Order: Malpighiales
- Family: Euphorbiaceae
- Genus: Astraea
- Species: A. lobata

Binomial name
- Astraea lobata (L.) Klotzsch

= Astraea lobata =

Species of flowering plant

Astraea lobata is a flowering plant in the spurge family, Euphorbiaceae. It is native from Mexico south to Argentina.
