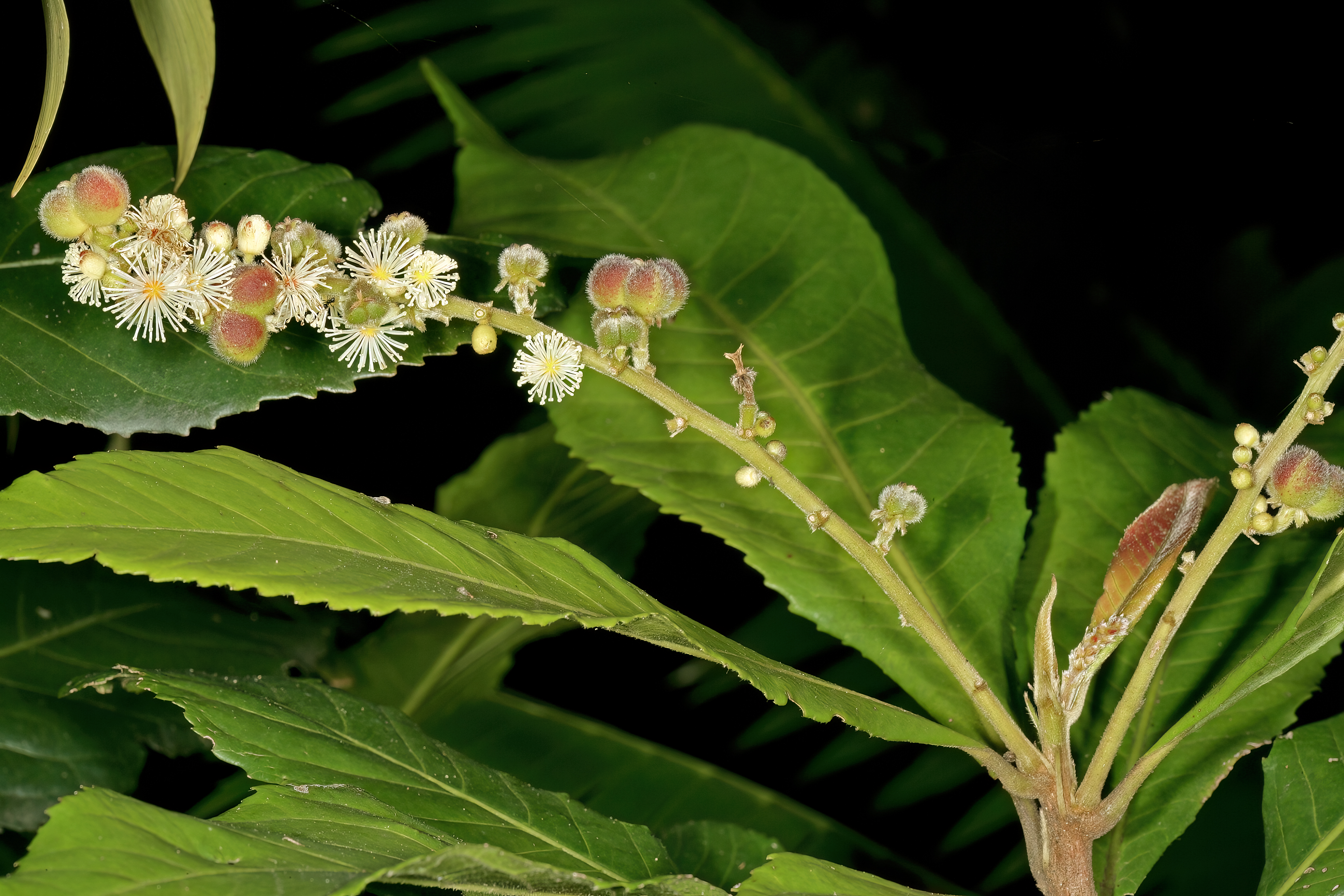
- Argomuellera macrophylla

Scientific classification
- Kingdom: Plantae
- Clade: Tracheophytes
- Clade: Angiosperms
- Clade: Eudicots
- Clade: Rosids
- Order: Malpighiales
- Family: Euphorbiaceae
- Subfamily: Acalyphoideae
- Tribe: Pycnocomeae

Subtribes and genera
- Subtribe Blumeodendrinae Blumeodendron Botryophora Podadenia Ptychopyxis Subtribe Pycnocominae Argomuellera Droceloncia Pycnocoma

= Pycnocomeae =

Tribe of plants

Pycnocomeae is a tribe of plant of the family Euphorbiaceae. It comprises 2 subtribes and 7 genera.

== See also ==
- Taxonomy of the Euphorbiaceae
