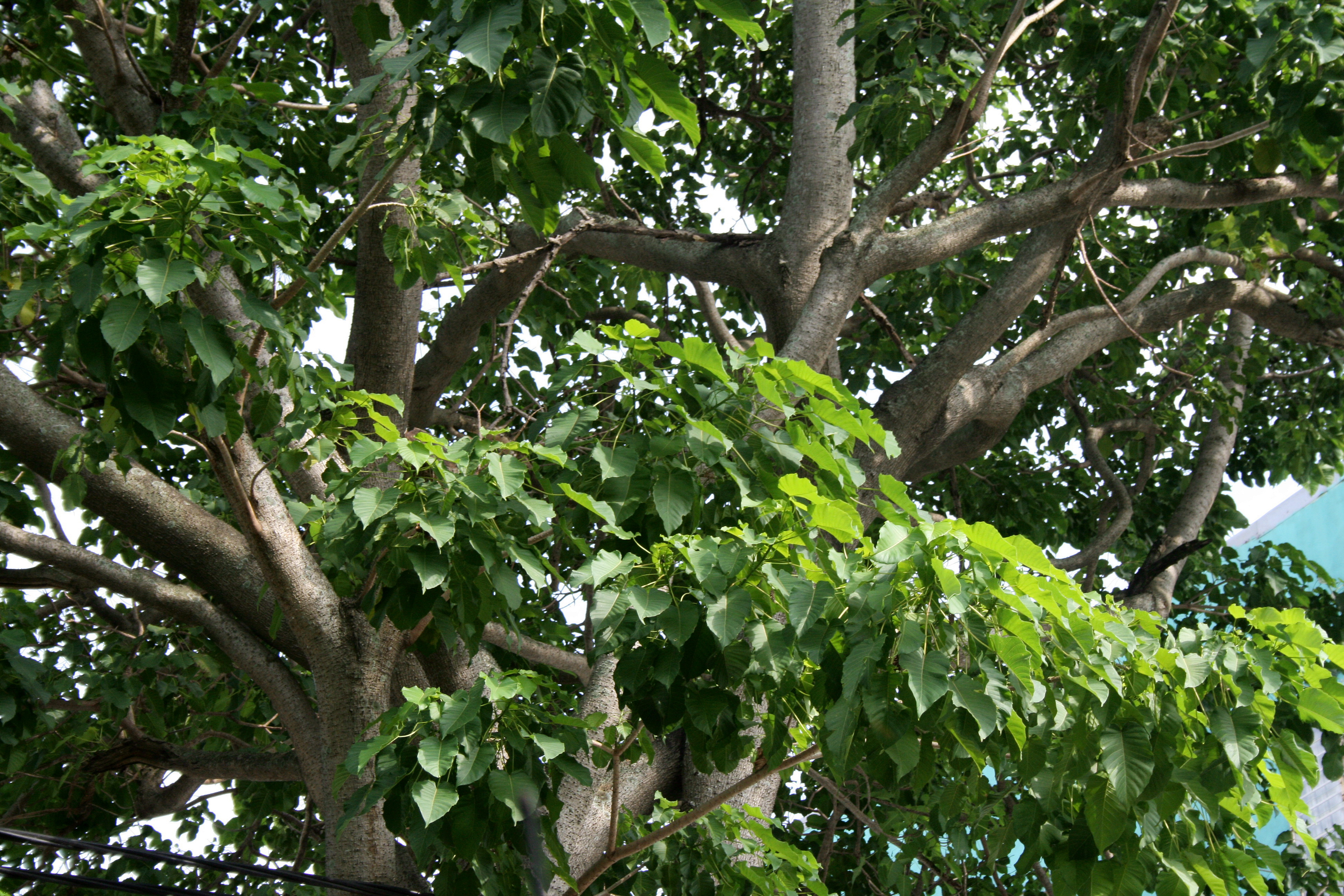
- Hura crepitans

Scientific classification
- Kingdom: Plantae
- Clade: Tracheophytes
- Clade: Angiosperms
- Clade: Eudicots
- Clade: Rosids
- Order: Malpighiales
- Family: Euphorbiaceae
- Subfamily: Euphorbioideae
- Tribe: Hureae; Dumort.

Genera
- Algernonia; Hura; Ophthalmoblapton; Tetraplandra

= Hureae =

Tribe of flowering plants

Hureae is a primarily South American tribe of plant of the family Euphorbiaceae that comprises three genera: Hura, Algernonia and Ophthalmoblapton.

== See also ==
- Taxonomy of the Euphorbiaceae
