= Ptychopyxis bacciformis =

Scientific classification
- Kingdom: Plantae
- Clade: Embryophytes
- Clade: Tracheophytes
- Clade: Spermatophytes
- Clade: Angiosperms
- Clade: Eudicots
- Clade: Rosids
- Order: Malpighiales
- Family: Euphorbiaceae
- Genus: Ptychopyxis
- Species: P. bacciformis

Binomial name
- Ptychopyxis bacciformis Croizat

Synonyms
- Ptychopyxis philippina Croizat; Ptychopyxis poilanei Croizat; Ptychopyxis triradiata Airy Shaw

Species of plant

Ptychopyxis bacciformis is a species of flowering plant in the family Euphorbiaceae, native to Vietnam to Sumatra and the Philippines. It was first described by Léon Croizat in 1942.

== Distribution ==
Ptychopyxis bacciformis is native to Borneo, Peninsular Malaysia, the Philippines, Sumatra and Vietnam.

== Conservation ==
Ptychopyxis triradiata was assessed as "vulnerable" in the 1998 IUCN Red List, where it is said to be native only to Peninsular Malaysia. As of February 2023, Pt. triradiata was regarded as a synonym of Ptychopyxis bacciformis, which has a wider distribution.
