= Pycnocoma macrantha =

Conservation status
- Endangered (IUCN 3.1)

Scientific classification
- Kingdom: Plantae
- Clade: Tracheophytes
- Clade: Angiosperms
- Clade: Eudicots
- Clade: Rosids
- Order: Malpighiales
- Family: Euphorbiaceae
- Genus: Pycnocoma
- Species: P. macrantha

Binomial name
- Pycnocoma macrantha Pax

Species of flowering plant

Pycnocoma macrantha is a species of plant in the family Euphorbiaceae. It is endemic to Tanzania.
