= Pycnocoma =

Scientific classification
- Kingdom: Plantae
- Clade: Embryophytes
- Clade: Tracheophytes
- Clade: Spermatophytes
- Clade: Angiosperms
- Clade: Eudicots
- Clade: Rosids
- Order: Malpighiales
- Family: Euphorbiaceae
- Subfamily: Acalyphoideae
- Tribe: Pycnocomeae
- Subtribe: Pycnocominae
- Genus: Pycnocoma; Benth.

Synonyms
- Comopyena Kuntze

Genus of plants

Pycnocoma is a genus of plant of the family Euphorbiaceae first described as a genus in 1849. It is native to tropical Africa and Madagascar.

Species

1. Pycnocoma angustifolia - Sierra Leone, Liberia, Ivory Coast
2. Pycnocoma bampsiana - Zaïre
3. Pycnocoma chevalieri - Zaïre, Congo, Gabon, Central African Rep, Uganda, South Sudan
4. Pycnocoma cornuta - Congo, Gabon, Central African Rep, Ghana, Nigeria
5. Pycnocoma dentata - Angola
6. Pycnocoma devredii - Kasai
7. Pycnocoma elua - Zaïre
8. Pycnocoma insularum - Zaïre
9. Pycnocoma littoralis - Kenya, Tanzania
10. Pycnocoma louisii - Zaïre
11. Pycnocoma macrantha - Lushoto
12. Pycnocoma macrophylla (Bomah-nut) - W + C Africa
13. Pycnocoma minor - Congo, Gabon, Central African Rep, Equatorial Guinea
14. Pycnocoma reticulata - Madagascar
15. Pycnocoma reygaertii - Zaïre
16. Pycnocoma subflava - Zaïre
17. Pycnocoma thollonii - Gabon
18. Pycnocoma thonneri - Congo, Zaïre

Formerly included

moved to other genera: Argomuellera Droceloncia

1. P. danguyana - Argomuellera danguyana
2. P. decaryana - Argomuellera decaryana
3. P. gigantea - Argomuellera gigantea
4. P. gigantea var. calcicola - Argomuellera calcicola
5. P. hirsuta - Argomuellera macrophylla
6. P. hutchinsonii - Argomuellera macrophylla
7. P. laurentii - Argomuellera macrophylla
8. P. parviflora - Argomuellera macrophylla
9. P. perrieri - Argomuellera perrieri
10. P. rigidifolia - Droceloncia rigidifolia
11. P. sapinii - Argomuellera macrophylla
12. P. sassandrae - Argomuellera macrophylla
13. P. trewioides - Argomuellera trewioides
