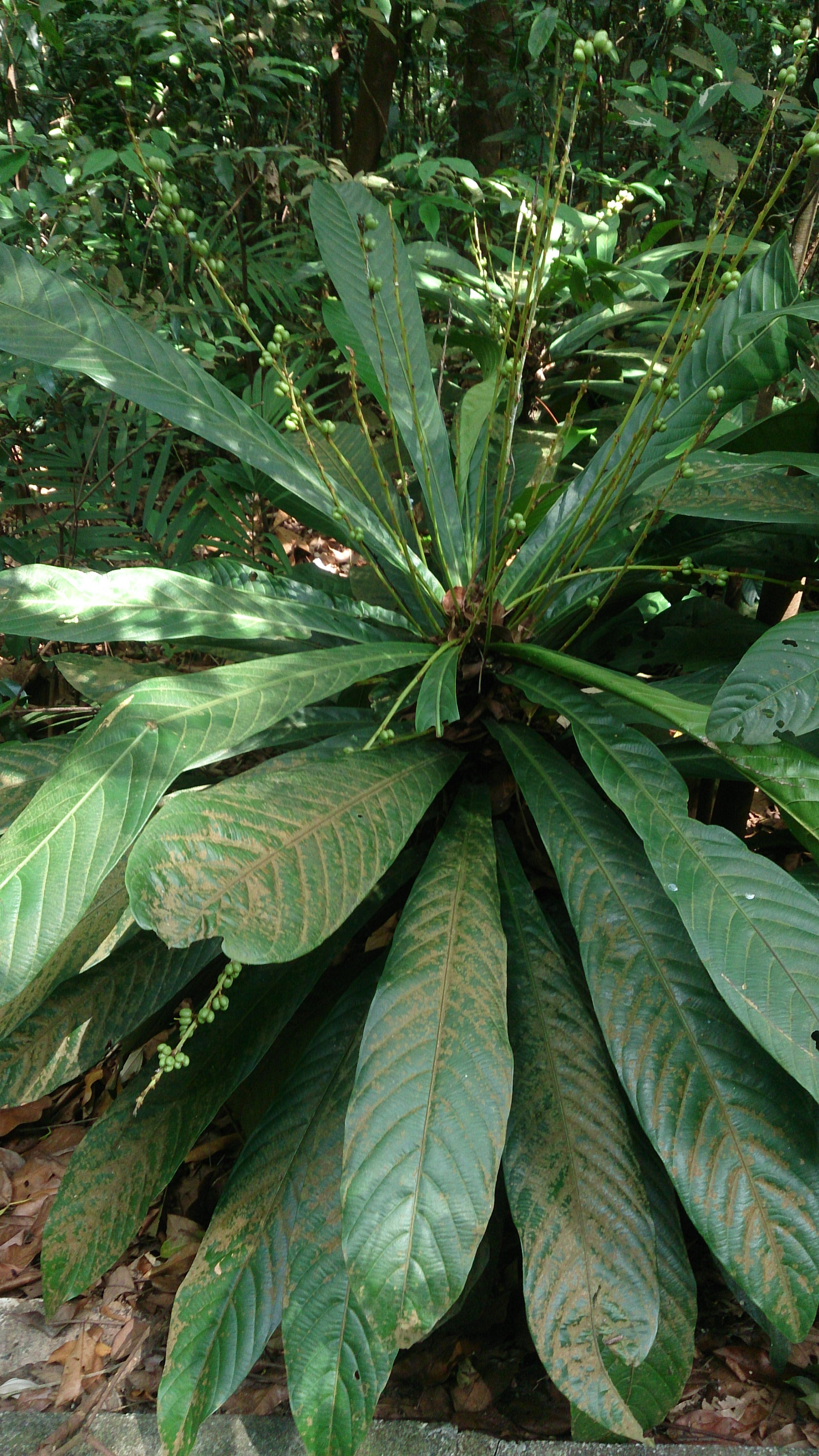
- Agrostistachys longifolia

Scientific classification
- Kingdom: Plantae
- Clade: Tracheophytes
- Clade: Angiosperms
- Clade: Eudicots
- Clade: Rosids
- Order: Malpighiales
- Family: Euphorbiaceae
- Subfamily: Acalyphoideae
- Tribe: Agrostistachydeae

Genera
- Agrostistachys; Chondrostylis; Cyttaranthus; Pseudagrostistachys

= Agrostistachydeae =

Tribe of flowering plants

The Agrostistachydeae is a tribe of the subfamily Acalyphoideae, under the family Euphorbiaceae. It comprises 4 genera, which are monophyletic.

== See also ==
- Taxonomy of the Euphorbiaceae
