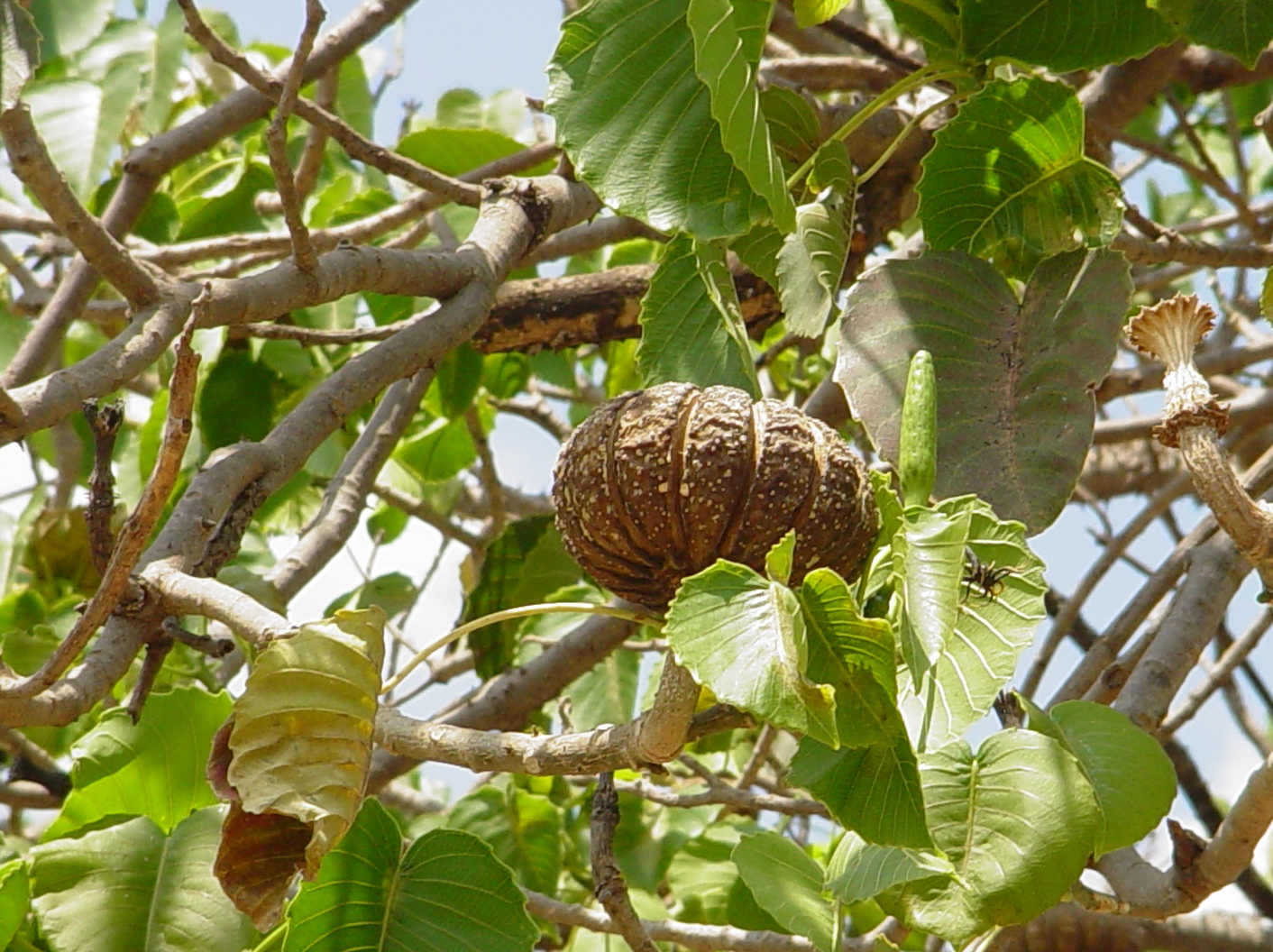

Conservation status
- Least Concern (IUCN 3.1)

Scientific classification
- Kingdom: Plantae
- Clade: Tracheophytes
- Clade: Angiosperms
- Clade: Eudicots
- Clade: Rosids
- Order: Malpighiales
- Family: Euphorbiaceae
- Genus: Hura
- Species: H. polyandra

Binomial name
- Hura polyandra Henri Ernest Baillon

= Hura polyandra =

Species of plant

Hura polyandra is a species of tree native to various parts of Latin America.

In 2019 the IUCN classified this species as least concern due to there being no recent evidence of significant threats or future ones, as well as its large distribution and population.

Trees can grow up to 30 meters in height and its flowers are monoecious with absent petals. The species occurs in cleared agricultural areas, forest plains, and rocky hillsides.

== Gallery ==
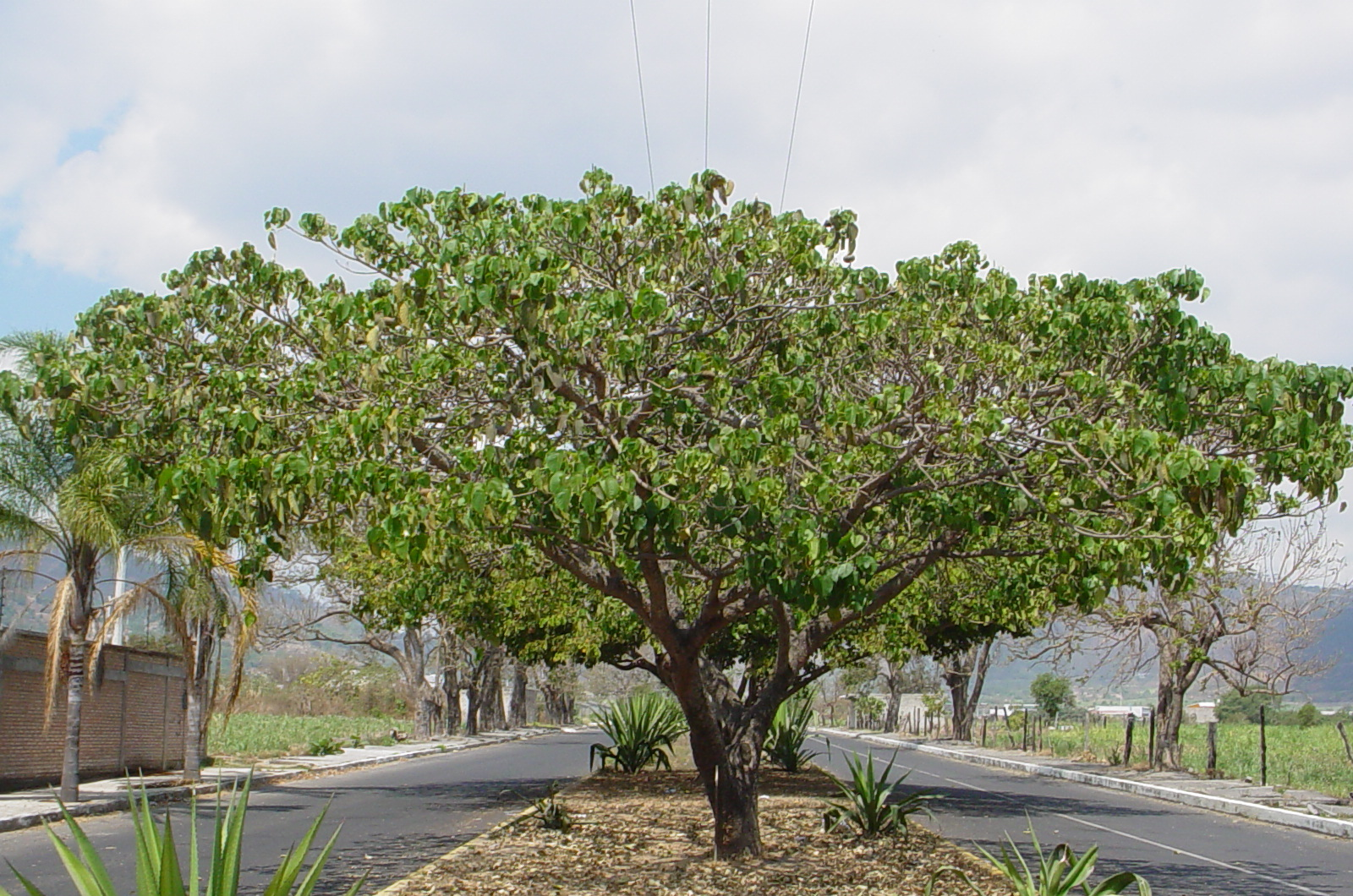
Hura polyandra tree

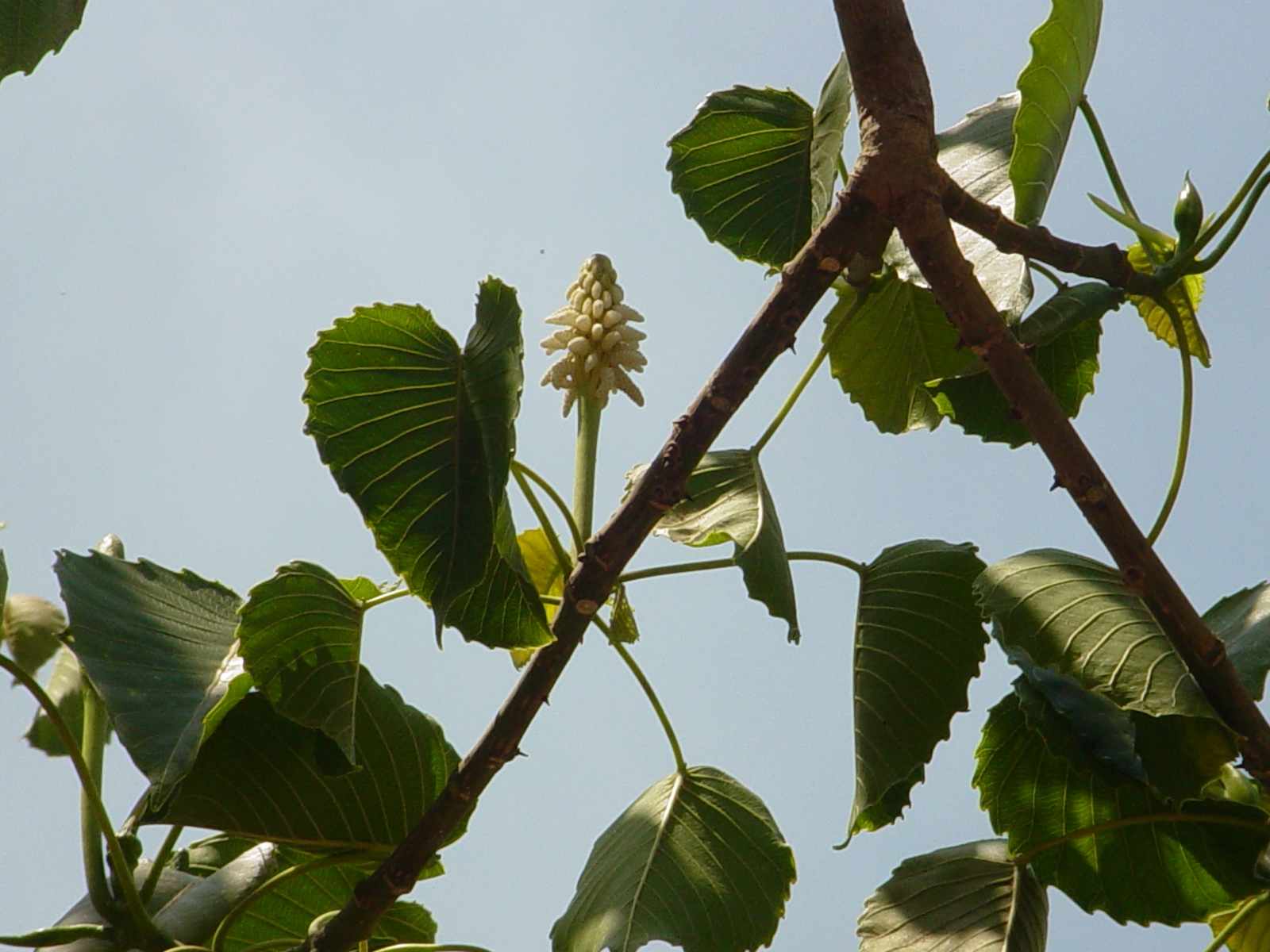
Hura polyandra flower
