= Pycnocoma littoralis =

Conservation status
- Least Concern (IUCN 3.1)

Scientific classification
- Kingdom: Plantae
- Clade: Tracheophytes
- Clade: Angiosperms
- Clade: Eudicots
- Clade: Rosids
- Order: Malpighiales
- Family: Euphorbiaceae
- Genus: Pycnocoma
- Species: P. littoralis

Binomial name
- Pycnocoma littoralis Pax

Species of flowering plant

Pycnocoma littoralis is a species of plant in the family Euphorbiaceae. It is found in Kenya and Tanzania.
