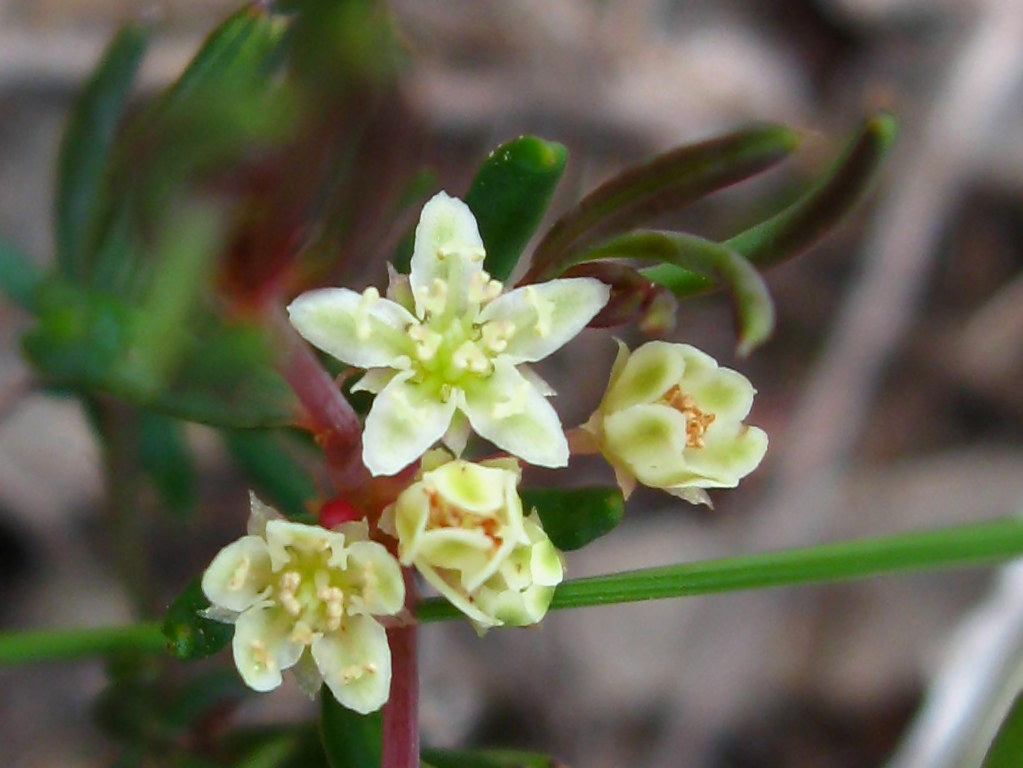
- Monotaxis grandiflora

Scientific classification
- Kingdom: Plantae
- Clade: Tracheophytes
- Clade: Angiosperms
- Clade: Eudicots
- Clade: Rosids
- Order: Malpighiales
- Family: Euphorbiaceae
- Subfamily: Acalyphoideae
- Tribe: Ampereae

Genera
- Amperea; Monotaxis

= Ampereae =

Tribe of flowering plants

The Ampereae is a tribe of the subfamily Acalyphoideae, under the family Euphorbiaceae. It comprises 2 genera.

== See also ==
- Taxonomy of the Euphorbiaceae
