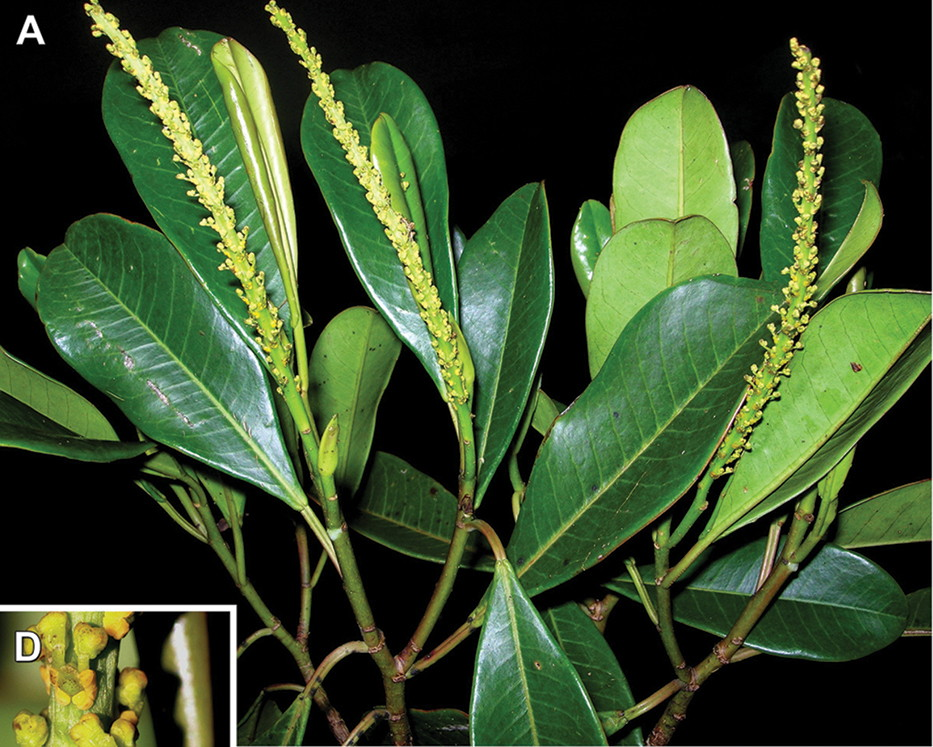

Scientific classification
- Kingdom: Plantae
- Clade: Tracheophytes
- Clade: Angiosperms
- Clade: Eudicots
- Clade: Rosids
- Order: Malpighiales
- Family: Euphorbiaceae
- Subfamily: Euphorbioideae
- Tribe: Hippomaneae
- Genus: Incadendron; K.Wurdack & Farfán
- Species: I. esseri

Binomial name
- Incadendron esseri K.Wurdack & Farfán

= Incadendron =

Genus of flowering plants

Incadendron is a genus of flowering plants in the family Euphorbiaceae. It includes a single species, Incadendron esseri, a tree native to southern Ecuador and Peru. It is a monoecious evergreen canopy tree with a spreading crown which grows 6 to 26 m tall, with glabrous leaves.

It is native to the subandean ranges between the high Andes to the west and the Amazon lowlands to the east. There are three widely-separated populations – in the Cordillera del Cóndor along the Ecuador-Peru border, in Oxapampa District, including in Yanachaga-Chemillén National Park, in central Peru, and a southern population in Manu National Park. It grows in humid montane rain forests from 1800 to 2400 m elevation.

The genus and species were described by Kenneth John Wurdack and William Farfán Rios in 2017. The genus name is a combination of Inca, the pre-Columbian empire which encompassed much of the species' range, and dendron, the Greek word for tree. The species epithet honors Hans-Joachim Esser of the Botanische Staatssammlung München, an expert on tribe Hippomaneae.
