= Phyllanoa =

Conservation status
- Least Concern (IUCN 3.1)

Scientific classification
- Kingdom: Plantae
- Clade: Tracheophytes
- Clade: Angiosperms
- Clade: Eudicots
- Clade: Rosids
- Order: Malpighiales
- Family: Euphorbiaceae
- Genus: Phyllanoa; Croizat (1943)
- Species: P. colombiana

Binomial name
- Phyllanoa colombiana Croizat (1943)

Genus of flowering plants

Phyllanoa colombiana is a species of flowering plant. It is the sole species in genus Phyllanoa. It is a tree native to the Andes of western Colombia.

It is known from a single location near the summit of the Cordillera Occidental west of Cali in Valle del Cauca Department. It grows in dense montane rain forest between 1,900 and 2,350 metres elevation. The population is on the edge of La Elvira National Protective Forest Reserve and inside the Cuenca Alta del Rio Cali National Protective Forest Reserve.

Plants of the World Online places the genus in the spurge family, Euphorbiaceae. In 1996 Hayden et al. placed it in family Violaceae.
