= Pachystroma =

- Pachystroma longifolium in Brazil

Conservation status
- Least Concern (IUCN 3.1)

Scientific classification
- Kingdom: Plantae
- Clade: Tracheophytes
- Clade: Angiosperms
- Clade: Eudicots
- Clade: Rosids
- Order: Malpighiales
- Family: Euphorbiaceae
- Subfamily: Euphorbioideae
- Tribe: Pachystromateae
- Genus: Pachystroma; Müll.Arg.
- Species: P. longifolium

Binomial name
- Pachystroma longifolium (Nees) I.M.Johnst.

Synonyms
- Genus: Acantholoma Gaudich. ex Baill.; Species: Ilex longifolia Nees; Pachystroma ilicifolium Müll. Arg.; Acantholoma spinosum Baill.; Pachystroma castaneifolium Klotzsch ex Pax

Genus of flowering plants

Pachystroma is a monotypic plant genus in the family Euphorbiaceae first described as a genus in 1865. It is the only genus of its tribe Pachystromateae. The only known species is Pachystroma longifolium, native to Brazil, Bolivia and Peru.
