= Weda (plant) =

Scientific classification
- Kingdom: Plantae
- Clade: Tracheophytes
- Clade: Angiosperms
- Clade: Eudicots
- Clade: Rosids
- Order: Malpighiales
- Family: Euphorbiaceae
- Tribe: Ricinocarpeae
- Genus: Weda; Welzen

Species
- Weda fragarioides Welzen; Weda lutea Welzen

Genus of flowering plants

Weda is a genus of flowering plants in the family Euphorbiaceae. It includes two species endemic to the Maluku Islands of Indonesia. The genus and species were first described in 2021.

- Weda fragarioides Welzen
- Weda lutea Welzen
