= Ptychopyxis =

Scientific classification
- Kingdom: Plantae
- Clade: Tracheophytes
- Clade: Angiosperms
- Clade: Eudicots
- Clade: Rosids
- Order: Malpighiales
- Family: Euphorbiaceae
- Subfamily: Acalyphoideae
- Tribe: Pycnocomeae
- Subtribe: Blumeodendrinae
- Genus: Ptychopyxis; Miq.

Synonyms
- Clarorivinia Pax & K.Hoffm.

Genus of plants

Ptychopyxis is a genus of plant of the family Euphorbiaceae first described in 1861. It is native to Southeast Asia and New Guinea.

Species

1. Ptychopyxis arborea - Borneo
2. Ptychopyxis bacciformis - Vietnam, Borneo, Sumatra, Philippines, W Malaysia
3. Ptychopyxis caput-medusae - W Malaysia
4. Ptychopyxis chrysantha - New Guinea
5. Ptychopyxis costata - Borneo, Sumatra, W Malaysia
6. Ptychopyxis glochidiifolia - Sumatra, Sarawak, Brunei, Kalimantan Timur
7. Ptychopyxis grandis - Borneo
8. Ptychopyxis javanica - S Thailand, Vietnam, W Malaysia, Borneo, Sumatra, Java
9. Ptychopyxis kingii - W Malaysia, E Sumatra, Sarawak, Sabah
10. Ptychopyxis plagiocarpa - S Thailand, S Myanmar

formerly included

moved to Koilodepas

1. Ptychopyxis frutescens - Koilodepas frutescens
2. Ptychopyxis thwaitesii - Podadenia sapida
