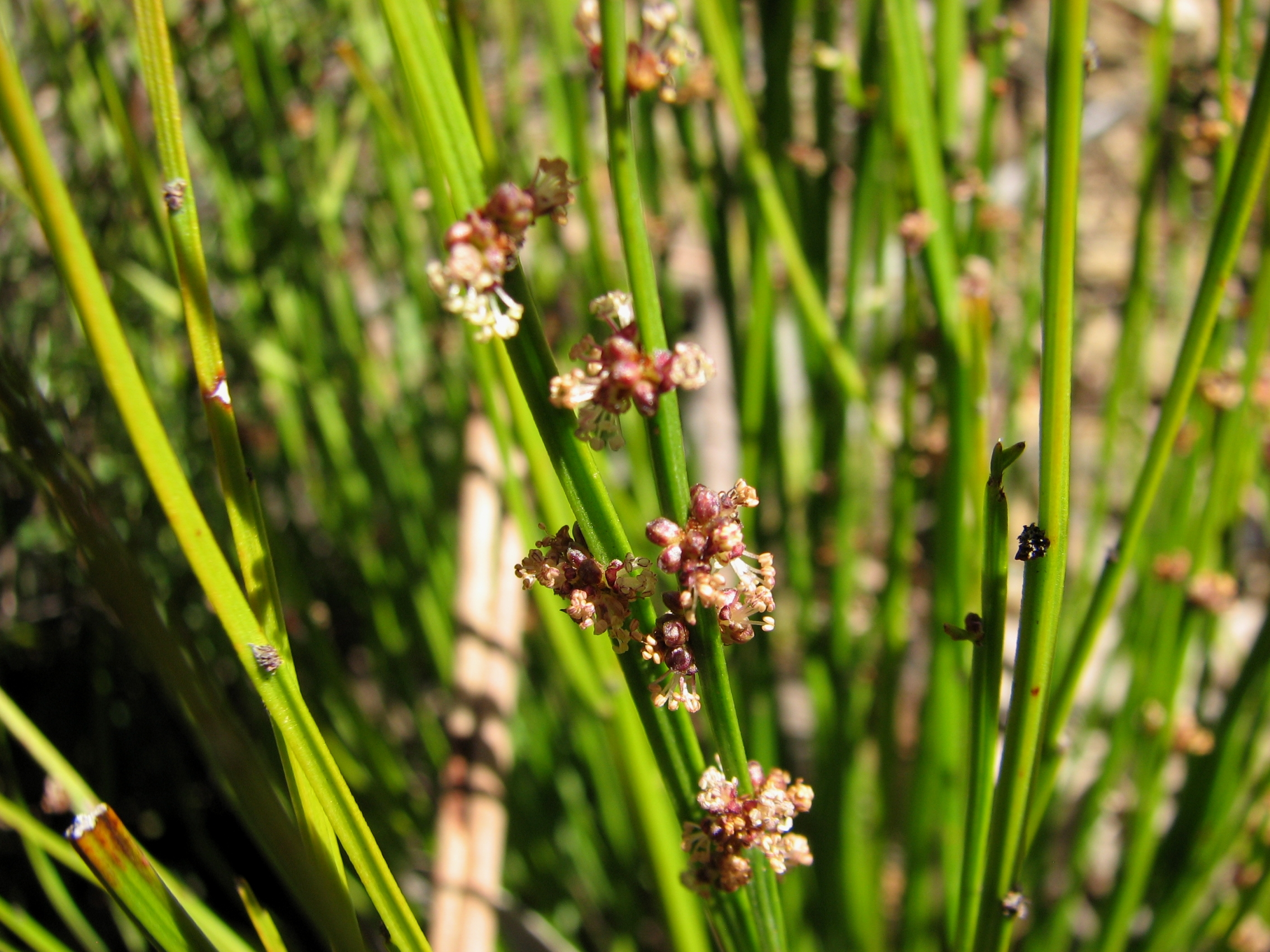
- Amperea xiphoclada

Scientific classification
- Kingdom: Plantae
- Clade: Tracheophytes
- Clade: Angiosperms
- Clade: Eudicots
- Clade: Rosids
- Order: Malpighiales
- Family: Euphorbiaceae
- Subfamily: Acalyphoideae
- Tribe: Ampereae
- Genus: Amperea; A.Juss.

= Amperea =

Genus of flowering plants

Amperea is a plant genus of the family Euphorbiaceae first described in 1824. The entire genus is endemic to Australia.

== Species ==
- Amperea conferta Benth. - Western Australia
- Amperea ericoides A.Juss. - Western Australia
- Amperea micrantha Benth. - Western Australia
- Amperea protensa Nees - Western Australia
- Amperea simulans R.J.F.Hend. - Western Australia
- Amperea spicata Airy Shaw - Northern Territory
- Amperea volubilis F.Muell. ex Benth. - Western Australia
- Amperea xiphoclada (Sieber ex Spreng.) Druce - Queensland, New South Wales, Victoria, Tasmania, South Australia
