= Botryophora =

Scientific classification
- Kingdom: Plantae
- Clade: Tracheophytes
- Clade: Angiosperms
- Clade: Eudicots
- Clade: Rosids
- Order: Malpighiales
- Family: Euphorbiaceae
- Subfamily: Acalyphoideae
- Tribe: Pycnocomeae
- Subtribe: Blumeodendrinae
- Genus: Botryophora; Hook.f.
- Species: B. geniculata

Binomial name
- Botryophora geniculata (Miq.) Beumée ex Airy Shaw

Synonyms
- Sterculia geniculata Miq.; Botryophora kingii Hook.f.

Genus of flowering plants

Botryophora is a genus of plant of the family Euphorbiaceae first described as a genus in 1888. It contains only one known species, Botryophora geniculata, native to Thailand, Myanmar, Malaysia, Borneo, Sumatra, and Java.
