= Monadelpha =

Scientific classification
- Kingdom: Plantae
- Clade: Tracheophytes
- Clade: Angiosperms
- Clade: Eudicots
- Clade: Rosids
- Order: Malpighiales
- Family: Euphorbiaceae
- Tribe: Plukenetieae
- Subtribe: Tragiinae
- Genus: Monadelpha; L.J.Gillespie & Card.-McTeag.
- Species: M. guayanensis

Binomial name
- Monadelpha guayanensis (L.J.Gillespie) L.J.Gillespie & Card.-McTeag.

Synonyms
- Tragia guayanensis L.J.Gillespie

Genus of flowering plants

Monadelpha is a genus of flowering plants in the family Euphorbiaceae. It includes a single species, Monadelpha guayanensis, a climbing subshrub native to Amazonas state in southern Venezuela.

The species was first described as Tragia guayanensis by Lynn J. Gillespie in 1994. In 2020 Gillespie and Warren M. Cardinal-McTeague placed the species in the newly-described genus Monadelpha as M. guayanensis.
