= Ptychopyxis javanica =

Scientific classification
- Kingdom: Plantae
- Clade: Tracheophytes
- Clade: Angiosperms
- Clade: Eudicots
- Clade: Rosids
- Order: Malpighiales
- Family: Euphorbiaceae
- Genus: Ptychopyxis
- Species: P. javanica

Binomial name
- Ptychopyxis javanica (J.J.Sm.) Croizat

Synonyms
- Podadenia javanica J.J.Sm; Ptychopyxis angustifolia Gage; Ptychopyxis arborea var. cacuminum Airy Shaw

Species of flowering plant

Ptychopyxis javanica is a plant species in the Euphorbiaceae. It is native to southern Thailand, Vietnam, Peninsular Malaysia, Borneo, Sumatra, and Java.
