= Syndyophyllum =

Scientific classification
- Kingdom: Plantae
- Clade: Tracheophytes
- Clade: Angiosperms
- Clade: Eudicots
- Clade: Rosids
- Order: Malpighiales
- Family: Euphorbiaceae
- Subfamily: Acalyphoideae
- Tribe: Erismantheae
- Genus: Syndyophyllum; Lauterb. & K.Schum.

Type species
- Syndyophyllum excelsum Lauterb. & K.Schum.

Genus of flowering plants

Syndyophyllum is a plant genus of the family Euphorbiaceae, first described as a genus in 1900. It is native to Sumatra, Borneo, and New Guinea.

Species

1. Syndyophyllum excelsum K.Schum. & Lauterb. - New Guinea
2. Syndyophyllum occidentale (Airy Shaw) Welzen - Sumatra, Borneo

Formerly included

Syndyophyllum trinervium K.Schum. & Lauterb., synonym of Mallotus trinervius (K.Schum. & Lauterb.) Pax & K.Hoffm.
