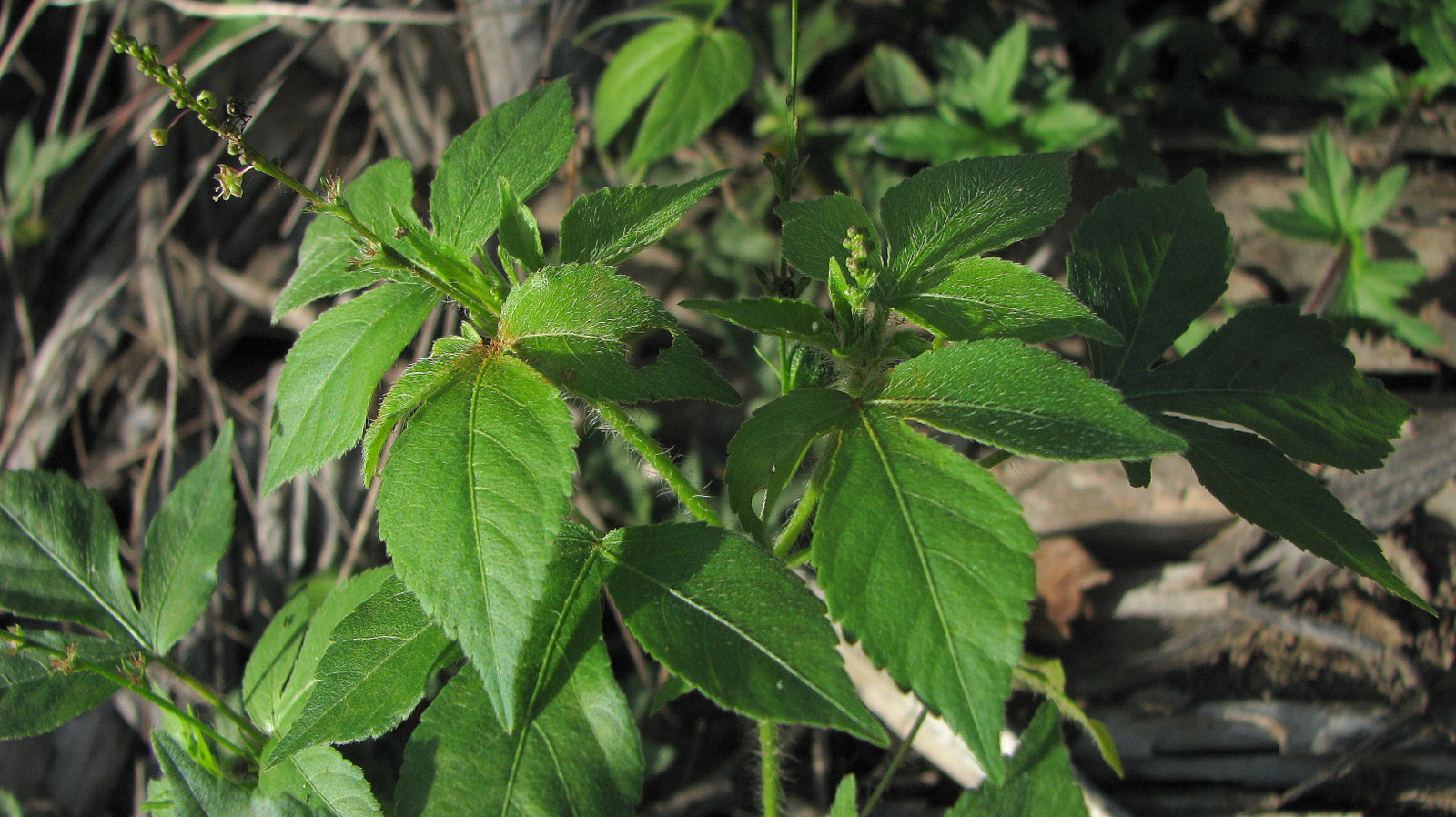
- Astraea lobata

Scientific classification
- Kingdom: Plantae
- Clade: Tracheophytes
- Clade: Angiosperms
- Clade: Eudicots
- Clade: Rosids
- Order: Malpighiales
- Family: Euphorbiaceae
- Subfamily: Crotonoideae
- Tribe: Crotoneae
- Genus: Astraea; Klotzsch 1841 not Schauer 1843 (syn of Thryptomene in Myrtaceae)

Type species
- Astraea lobata (L.) Klotzsch.

= Astraea (plant) =

Genus of flowering plants

Astraea is a plant genus of the family Euphorbiaceae first described as a genus in 1841. It is native to tropical regions of the Western Hemisphere.

Species

1. Astraea aureomarginata - Paraguay
2. Astraea cincta - Brazil
3. Astraea comosa - Minas Gerais
4. Astraea hauthalii - Paraguay
5. Astraea jatropha - Rio de Janeiro, Minas Gerais
6. Astraea klotzschii - E Brazil
7. Astraea lobata - widespread from Florida and Mexico south to northern Argentina; naturalized in Africa, Indian Subcontinent, Arabian Peninsula
8. Astraea praetervisa - Bahia
