= Radcliffea =

Scientific classification
- Kingdom: Plantae
- Clade: Tracheophytes
- Clade: Angiosperms
- Clade: Eudicots
- Clade: Rosids
- Order: Malpighiales
- Family: Euphorbiaceae
- Subfamily: Crotonoideae
- Genus: Radcliffea; Petra Hoffm. & K.Wurdack
- Species: R. smithii

Binomial name
- Radcliffea smithii Petra Hoffm. & K.Wurdack

Genus of flowering plants

Radcliffea is a genus of flowering plants in the family Euphorbiaceae. It includes a single species, Radcliffea smithii, a shrub or tree endemic to Madagascar.
