= Bossera =

Scientific classification
- Kingdom: Plantae
- Clade: Tracheophytes
- Clade: Angiosperms
- Clade: Eudicots
- Clade: Rosids
- Order: Malpighiales
- Family: Euphorbiaceae
- Subfamily: Acalyphoideae
- Tribe: Alchorneae
- Subtribe: Alchorneinae
- Genus: Bossera; Leandri
- Species: B. cristatocarpa

Binomial name
- Bossera cristatocarpa Leandri

Genus of flowering plants

Bossera is a genus of flowering plants in the family Euphorbiaceae. It includes a single species, Bossera cristatocarpa, a shrub endemic to Madagascar.

The genus and species were described by Jacques Désiré Leandri in 1962.
