= Stomatocalyceae =

Scientific classification
- Kingdom: Plantae
- Clade: Tracheophytes
- Clade: Angiosperms
- Clade: Eudicots
- Clade: Rosids
- Order: Malpighiales
- Family: Euphorbiaceae
- Subfamily: Euphorbioideae
- Tribe: Stomatocalyceae; G.L.Webster

Subtribes and genera
- Subtribe Hamilcoinae Hamilcoa Nealchornea Subtribe Stomatocalycinae Pimelodendron (also Stomatocalyx) Plagiostyles

Tribe of flowering plants

Stomatocalyceae is a tribe of plant of the family Euphorbiaceae. It comprises two subtribes and four genera.
