= Chlamydojatropha =

Scientific classification
- Kingdom: Plantae
- Clade: Tracheophytes
- Clade: Angiosperms
- Clade: Eudicots
- Clade: Rosids
- Order: Malpighiales
- Family: Euphorbiaceae
- Genus: Chlamydojatropha; Pax & K.Hoffm.
- Species: C. kamerunica

Binomial name
- Chlamydojatropha kamerunica Pax & K.Hoffm.

Genus of flowering plants

Chlamydojatropha is a genus of flowering plants belonging to the family Euphorbiaceae. It includes a single species, Chlamydojatropha kamerunica, a shrub endemic to Cameroon.

Both genus and species were described by Käthe Hoffmann and Ferdinand Albin Pax in 1912.
