= Gradyana =

Scientific classification
- Kingdom: Plantae
- Clade: Tracheophytes
- Clade: Angiosperms
- Clade: Eudicots
- Clade: Rosids
- Order: Malpighiales
- Family: Euphorbiaceae
- Subfamily: Euphorbioideae
- Tribe: Hippomaneae
- Genus: Gradyana; Athiê-Souza, A.L.Melo & M.F.Sales
- Species: G. franciscana

Binomial name
- Gradyana franciscana Athiê-Souza, A.L.Melo & M.F.Sales

Genus of flowering plants

Gradyana is a genus of flowering plants in the family Euphorbiaceae. It includes a single species, Gradyana franciscana a shrub native to Alagoas and Sergipe states in northeastern Brazil. It is a monoecious subshrub to shrub growing 0.8 to 3 m tall, branched with glabrous leaves, and white latex in young stems. It is known from 10 populations in the Xingó region of the São Francisco River valley in Alagoas and Sergipe. It grows in riparian forest along the lower São Francisco river from 20 to 30 meters elevation, in rocky areas with bushy and sparse vegetation with Chresta martii, Cyperus sp. Croton heliotropiifolius, Desmanthus pernambucanus, Senna splendida, Banisteriopsis sp., Ayenia filipes, and Lippia pedunculosa.

The species and genus were described by Sarah Maria Athiê-Souza, Andrê Laurenio de Melo, and Margareth Ferreira de Sales in 2015. The genus name honors Grady L. Webster (1927–2005) of the University of California, Davis, a Euphorbiaceae systematist who a course in Euphorbiaceae taxonomy at the Universidade Federal Rural de Pernambuco in northeastern Brazil. The species epithet refers to the São Francisco River, which is where the species was collected.
