= Plagiostyles =

Scientific classification
- Kingdom: Plantae
- Clade: Tracheophytes
- Clade: Angiosperms
- Clade: Eudicots
- Clade: Rosids
- Order: Malpighiales
- Family: Euphorbiaceae
- Subfamily: Euphorbioideae
- Tribe: Stomatocalyceae
- Subtribe: Stomatocalycinae
- Genus: Plagiostyles; Pierre

Species of flowering plant

Plagiostyles is a plant genus in the family Euphorbiaceae first described as a genus in 1897. It is native to tropical Africa.

Species

1. Plagiostyles africana (Müll.Arg.) Prain - Nigeria, Cameroon, Gabon, Cabinda Province, Angola, Equatorial Guinea, Republic of the Congo, Democratic Republic of the Congo
2. Plagiostyles pinnatus Willd. - Gabon
