= Cyttaranthus =

Scientific classification
- Kingdom: Plantae
- Clade: Tracheophytes
- Clade: Angiosperms
- Clade: Eudicots
- Clade: Rosids
- Order: Malpighiales
- Family: Euphorbiaceae
- Subfamily: Acalyphoideae
- Tribe: Agrostistachydeae
- Genus: Cyttaranthus; J.Léonard
- Species: C. congolensis

Binomial name
- Cyttaranthus congolensis J.Léonard

Genus of flowering plants

Cyttaranthus is a plant genus of the family Euphorbiaceae first described as a genus in 1955. It contains only one known species, Cyttaranthus congolensis, native to tropical Africa (Congo-Brazzaville, Congo-Kinshasa (Zaire), Gabon, Cabinda, Tanzania).
