= Nealchornea =

Scientific classification
- Kingdom: Plantae
- Clade: Tracheophytes
- Clade: Angiosperms
- Clade: Eudicots
- Clade: Rosids
- Order: Malpighiales
- Family: Euphorbiaceae
- Subfamily: Euphorbioideae
- Tribe: Stomatocalyceae
- Subtribe: Hamilcoinae
- Genus: Nealchornea; Huber

Genus of trees

Nealchornea is a genus of trees in the family Euphorbiaceae first described as a genus in 1913. It is native to South America.

Species

1. Nealchornea stipitata B.Walln. - Amazonas State in Brazil
2. Nealchornea yapurensis Huber - E Colombia, Peru, Ecuador, Amazonas State
