= Chondrostylis =

Scientific classification
- Kingdom: Plantae
- Clade: Tracheophytes
- Clade: Angiosperms
- Clade: Eudicots
- Clade: Rosids
- Order: Malpighiales
- Family: Euphorbiaceae
- Subfamily: Acalyphoideae
- Tribe: Agrostistachydeae
- Genus: Chondrostylis; Boerl.

Synonyms
- Kunstlerodendron Ridl.

Genus of flowering plants

Chondrostylis is a plant genus of the family Euphorbiaceae first described as a genus in 1897. It is native to Thailand, Peninsular Malaysia, Sumatra and Borneo.

Species

1. Chondrostylis bancana Boerl. - Bangka, Kalimantan Tengah
2. Chondrostylis kunstleri (King ex Hook.f.) Airy Shaw - S Thailand, W Malaysia, Borneo, Sumatra
