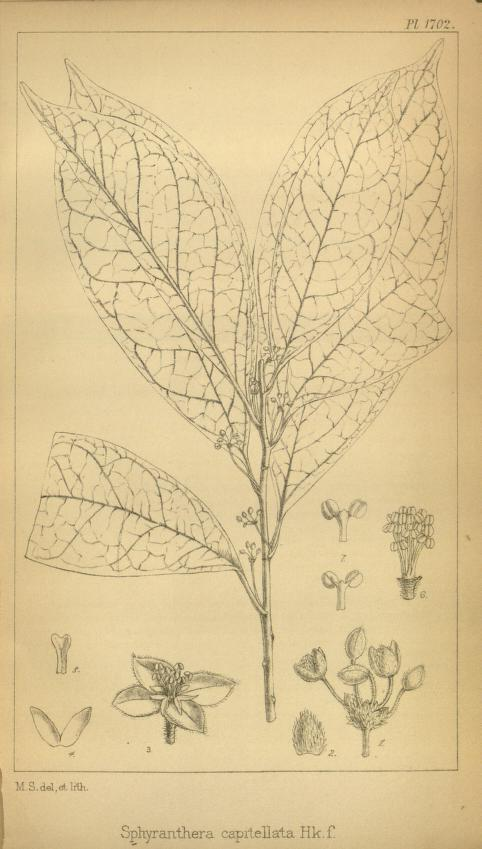
- Pl. 1702 Sphyranthera lutescens

Scientific classification
- Kingdom: Plantae
- Clade: Tracheophytes
- Clade: Angiosperms
- Clade: Eudicots
- Clade: Rosids
- Order: Malpighiales
- Family: Euphorbiaceae
- Subfamily: Acalyphoideae
- Tribe: Sphyranthereae; Radcl.-Sm.
- Genus: Sphyranthera; Hook.f.

= Sphyranthera =

Genus of flowering plants

Sphyranthera is a plant genus of the family Euphorbiaceae and the only genus of its tribe (Sphyranthereae). It was first described in 1887. The entire genus is endemic to the Andaman & Nicobar Islands in the Bay of Bengal, politically part of India but geographically closer to Myanmar.

Species

- Sphyranthera airyshawii Chakrab. & Vasudeva Rao - N Andaman Islands
- Sphyranthera lutescens (Kurz) Pax & K.Hoffm. - N Nicobar Islands + C Andaman Islands
