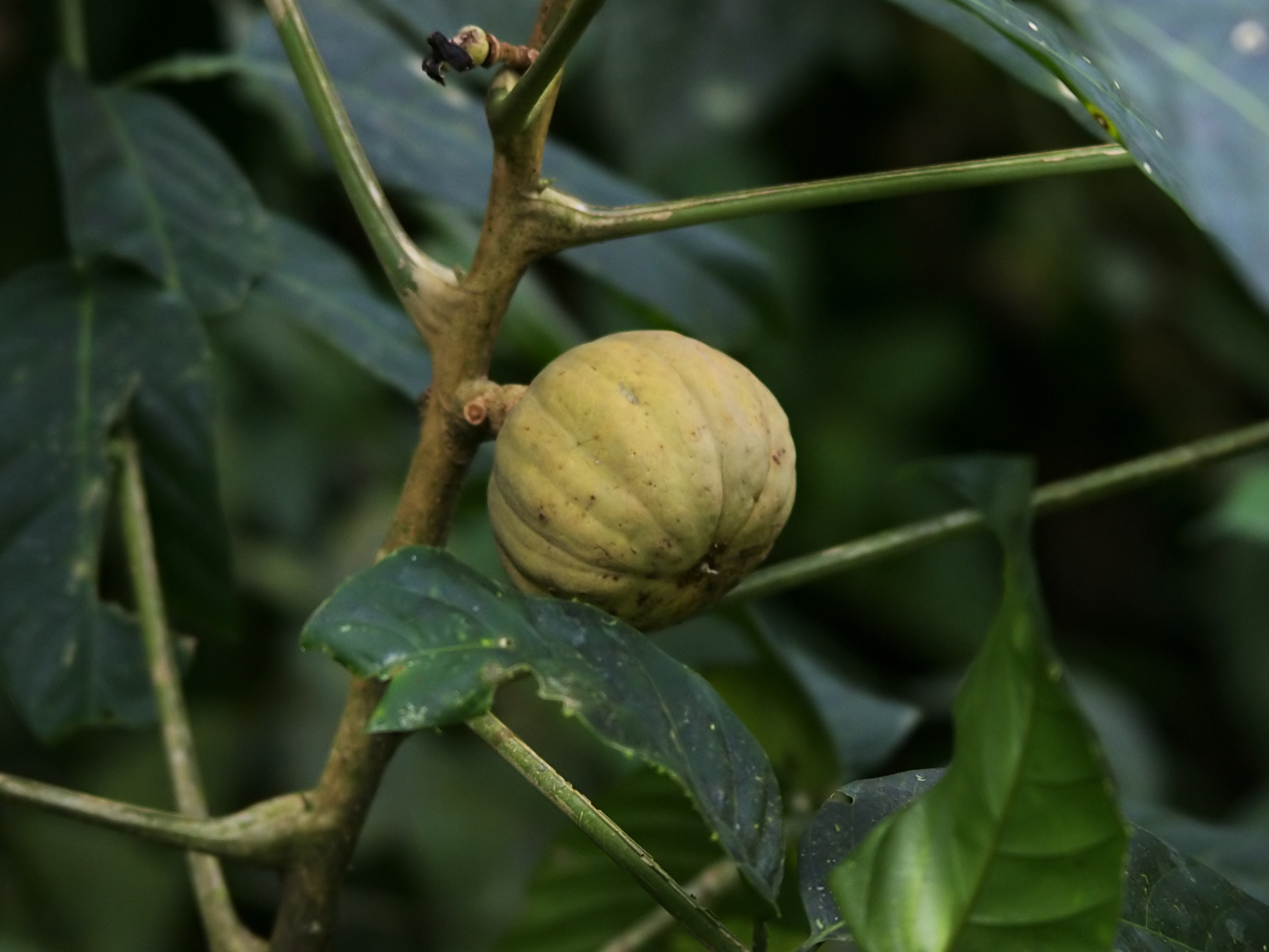
- Hura crepitans

Scientific classification
- Kingdom: Plantae
- Clade: Tracheophytes
- Clade: Angiosperms
- Clade: Eudicots
- Clade: Rosids
- Order: Malpighiales
- Family: Euphorbiaceae
- Subfamily: Euphorbioideae
- Tribe: Hureae
- Genus: Hura; L.

Species
- Hura crepitans L.; Hura polyandra Baill.

= Hura (plant) =

Genus of flowering plants

Hura is a genus of trees in the family Euphorbiaceae described by Carl Linnaeus in 1753. It is native to South America, Mesoamerica, and the West Indies.

== Species ==
1. Hura crepitans L. - from Nicaragua + Bahamas south to Bolivia; naturalized in parts of Africa (Guinea, Guinea-Bissau, Benin, Central African Republic)
2. Hura polyandra Baill. - Mexico, Central America, Ecuador

=== Names in homonymic genus ===
In 1783, Johann Gerhard König used the name Hura to refer to a very different plant from the one Linnaeus had named. Thus was created an illegitimate homonym. Under the rules of nomenclature, Koenig's name had to be abandoned. The two names created using his genus are now in the genus Globba, as follows:

1. Hura koenigii - Globba pendula (Zingiberaceae)
2. Hura siamensium - Globba pendula (Zingiberaceae)

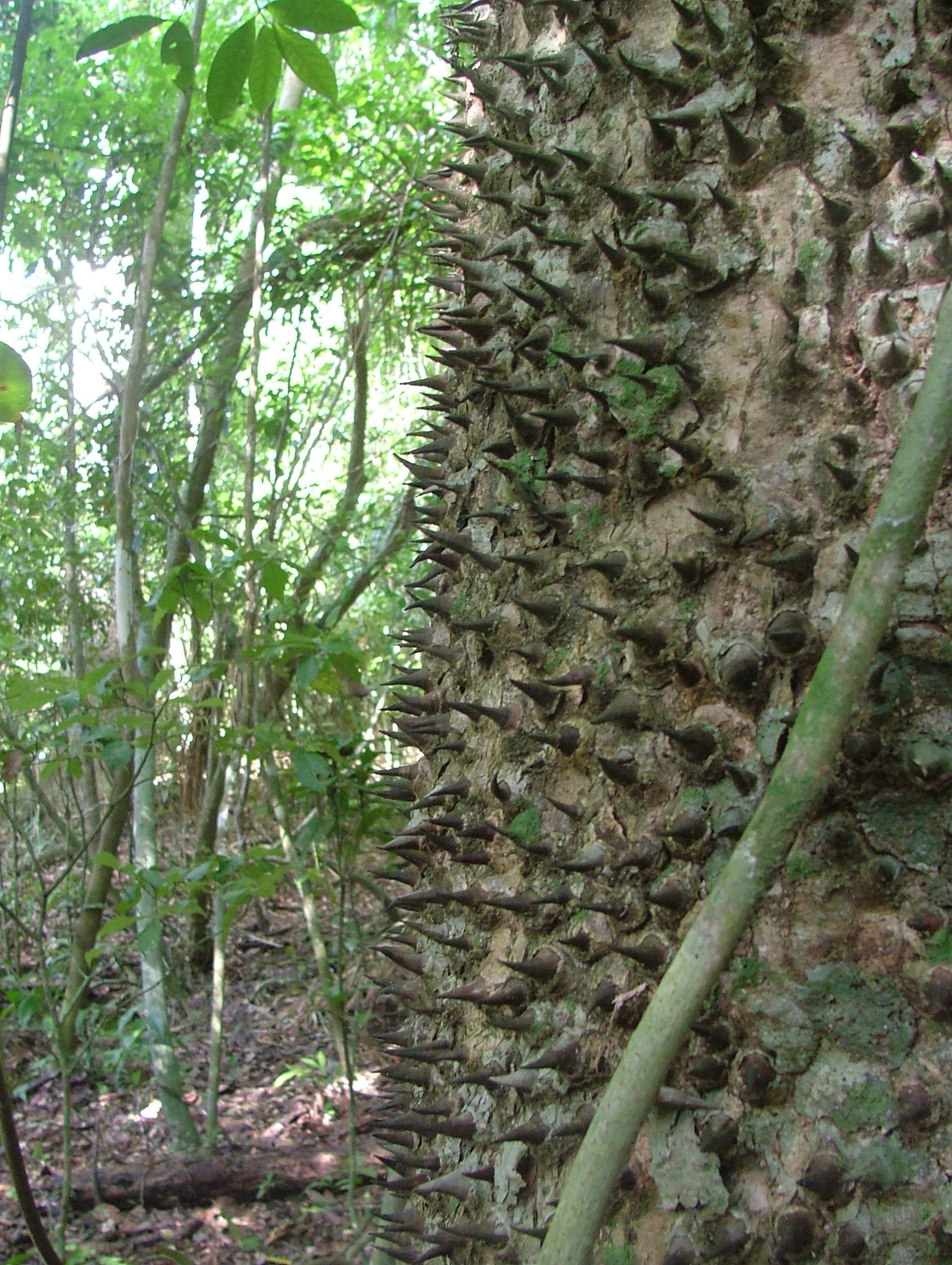
Detail of the spines on the bark of a Hura tree
