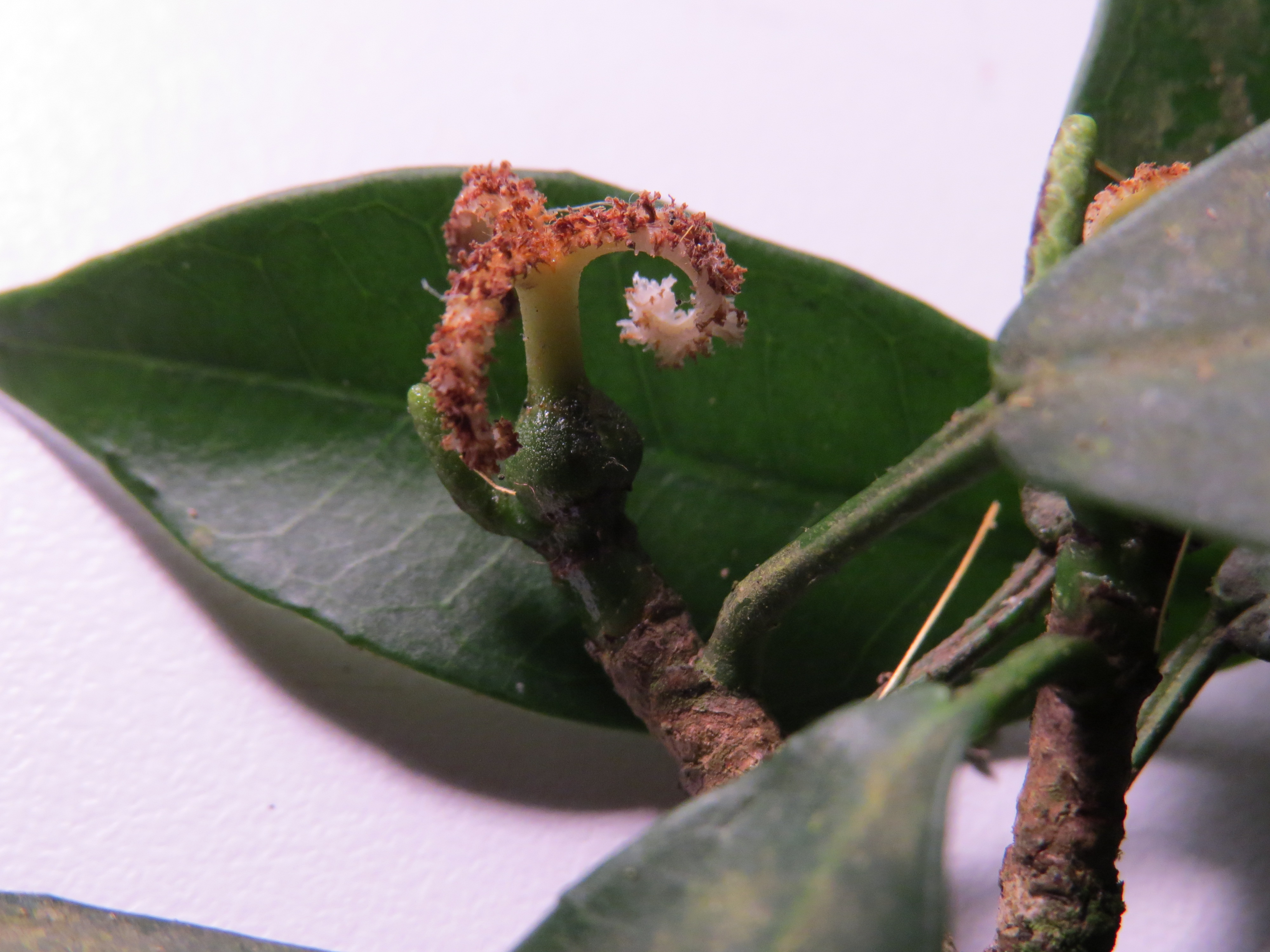

Scientific classification
- Kingdom: Plantae
- Clade: Tracheophytes
- Clade: Angiosperms
- Clade: Eudicots
- Clade: Rosids
- Order: Malpighiales
- Family: Euphorbiaceae
- Subfamily: Euphorbioideae
- Tribe: Hureae
- Genus: Algernonia; Baill.

Synonyms
- Tetraplandra Baill.; Dendrobryon Klotzsch ex Pax

= Algernonia =

Genus of flowering plants

Algernonia is a plant genus of the family Euphorbiaceae first described as a genus in 1858. It is native to Peru and Brazil.

Species

- Algernonia amazonica - Huanuco, Amazonas
- Algernonia bahiensis - Bahia
- Algernonia brasiliensis - São Paulo, Rio de Janeiro
- Algernonia dimitrii - SE Brazil
- Algernonia gibbosa - Rio de Janeiro
- Algernonia glazioui - Rio de Janeiro
- Pau-de-leite (Algernonia kuhlmannii) - Peru, SE Brazil
- Algernonia leandrii - SE Brazil
- Algernonia obovata - Bahia, Rio de Janeiro
- Algernonia pardina - Bahia
- Algernonia paulae - Rio de Janeiro
- Algernonia riedelii - Rio de Janeiro
