= Ophthalmoblapton =

Scientific classification
- Kingdom: Plantae
- Clade: Tracheophytes
- Clade: Angiosperms
- Clade: Eudicots
- Clade: Rosids
- Order: Malpighiales
- Family: Euphorbiaceae
- Subfamily: Euphorbioideae
- Tribe: Hureae
- Genus: Ophthalmoblapton; Allemão

Genus of flowering plants

Ophthalmoblapton is a plant genus of the family Euphorbiaceae first described as a genus in 1849. The entire genus is endemic to eastern Brazil.

Species

1. Ophthalmoblapton crassipes Müll.Arg. - Bahia
2. Ophthalmoblapton macrophyllum Allemão - Rio de Janeiro
3. Ophthalmoblapton parviflorum Emmerich - Bahia
4. Ophthalmoblapton pedunculare Müll.Arg. - Bahia, Minas Gerais, São Paulo, Rio de Janeiro
