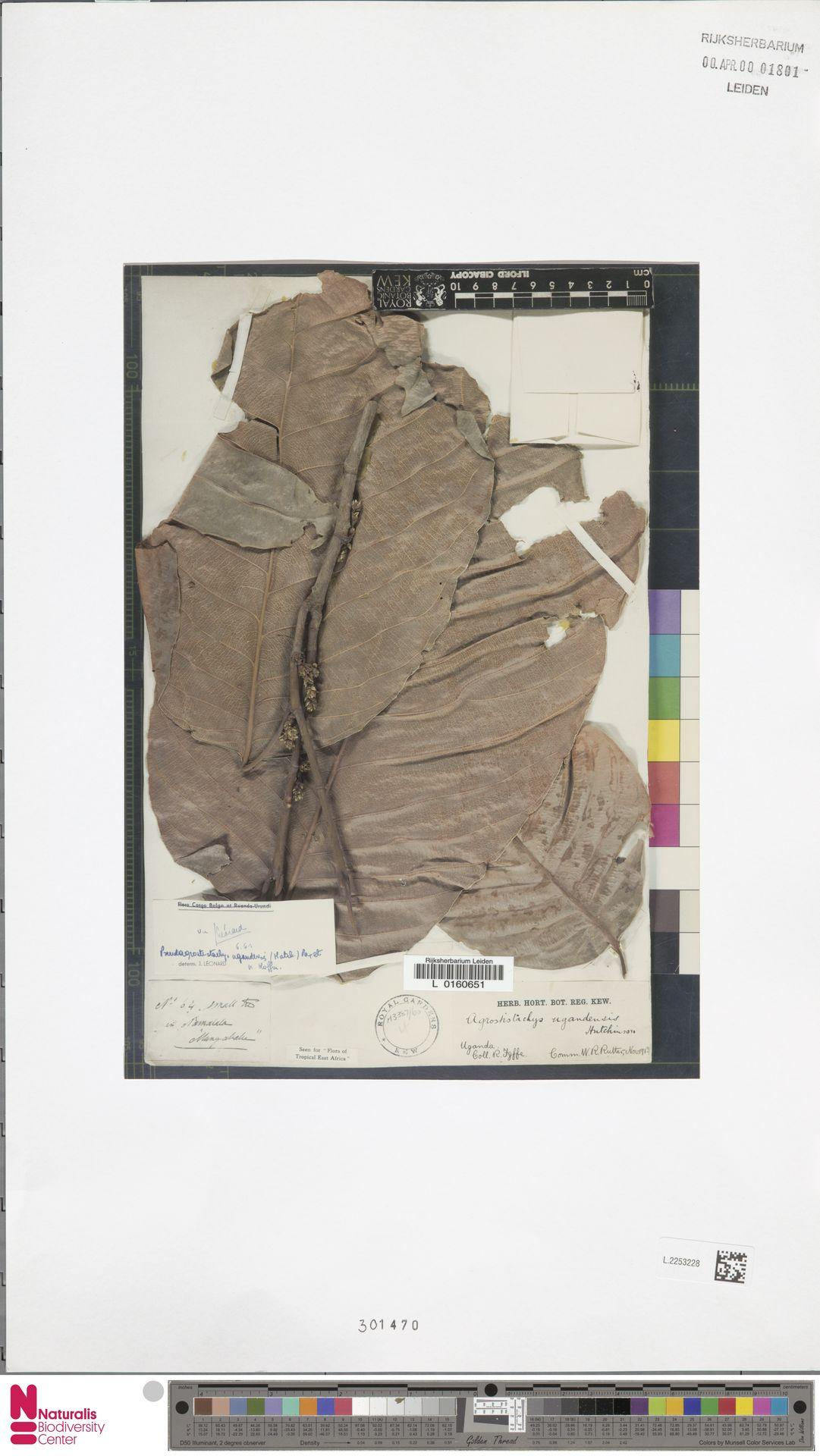
- Specimen of Pseudagrostistachys ugandensis at Naturalis Biodiversity Center, Netherlands

Scientific classification
- Kingdom: Plantae
- Clade: Tracheophytes
- Clade: Angiosperms
- Clade: Eudicots
- Clade: Rosids
- Order: Malpighiales
- Family: Euphorbiaceae
- Subfamily: Acalyphoideae
- Tribe: Agrostistachydeae
- Genus: Pseudagrostistachys; Pax & K.Hoffm.

Type species
- Agrostistachys africana Müll.Arg.

= Pseudagrostistachys =

Genus of flowering plants

Pseudagrostistachys is a plant genus of the family Euphorbiaceae first described as a genus in 1912. It is native to tropical Africa.

Species

1. Pseudagrostistachys africana (Müll.Arg.) Pax & K.Hoffm. - Ghana, Nigeria, Congo-Brazzaville, Equatorial Guinea, Zaire, São Tomé and Príncipe
2. Pseudagrostistachys ugandensis (Hutch.) Pax & K.Hoffm. - Uganda, Tanzania, Zaire, Zambia
