= Hamilcoa =

Conservation status
- Vulnerable (IUCN 3.1)

Scientific classification
- Kingdom: Plantae
- Clade: Tracheophytes
- Clade: Angiosperms
- Clade: Eudicots
- Clade: Rosids
- Order: Malpighiales
- Family: Euphorbiaceae
- Subfamily: Euphorbioideae
- Tribe: Stomatocalyceae
- Subtribe: Hamilcoinae
- Genus: Hamilcoa; Prain
- Species: H. zenkeri

Binomial name
- Hamilcoa zenkeri (Pax) Prain

Synonyms
- Plukenetia zenkeri Pax

Genus of flowering plants

Hamilcoa is a plant genus in the family Euphorbiaceae first described as a genus in 1912. It contains only one known species, Hamilcoa zenkeri, native to Nigeria and Cameroon.
