= Brasiliocroton =

Scientific classification
- Kingdom: Plantae
- Clade: Tracheophytes
- Clade: Angiosperms
- Clade: Eudicots
- Clade: Rosids
- Order: Malpighiales
- Family: Euphorbiaceae
- Subfamily: Crotonoideae
- Tribe: Crotoneae
- Genus: Brasiliocroton; P.E.Berry & Cordeiro

Genus of flowering plants

Brasiliocroton is a plant genus in the family Euphorbiaceae. The genus was first described in 2005 from lowland forests in eastern and northeastern Brazil, whence its name.

== Species ==
There are two species in the genus: Brasiliocroton mamoninha and Brasiliocroton muricatus, which can be distinguished by the flowers, fruit, pollen, among others.
