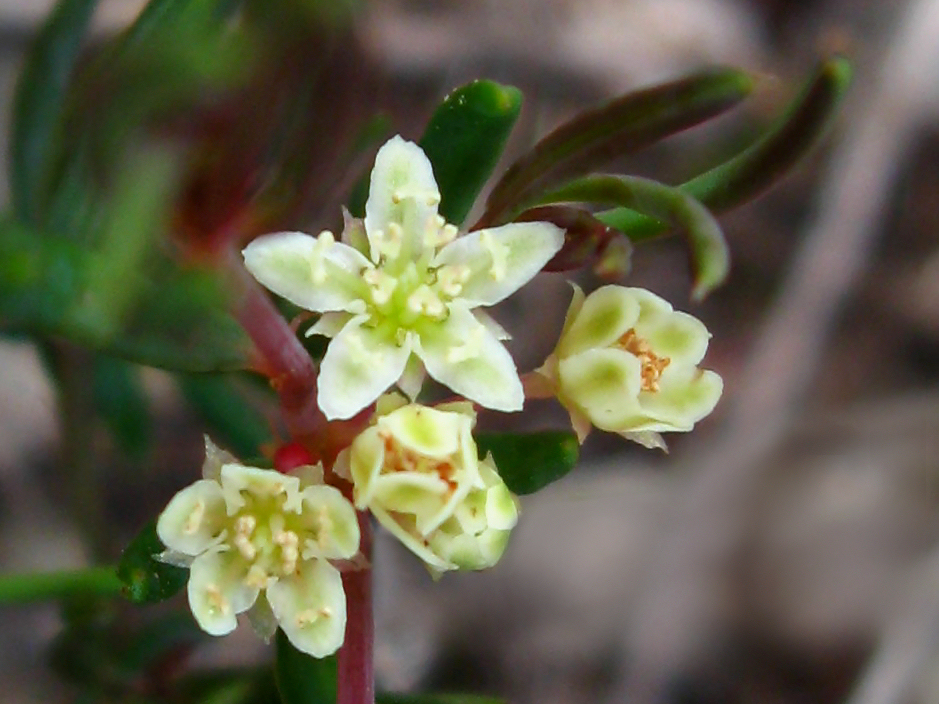
- Monotaxis grandiflora

Scientific classification
- Kingdom: Plantae
- Clade: Tracheophytes
- Clade: Angiosperms
- Clade: Eudicots
- Clade: Rosids
- Order: Malpighiales
- Family: Euphorbiaceae
- Subfamily: Acalyphoideae
- Tribe: Ampereae
- Genus: Monotaxis; Brongn.

Synonyms
- Hippocrepandra Mull.Arg.; Reissipa Steud. ex Klotzsch

= Monotaxis (plant) =

Genus of flowering plants

Monotaxis is a plant genus in the family Euphorbiaceae first described as a genus in 1829. The entire genus is endemic to Australia.

Species

- Monotaxis bracteata Nees ex Klotzsch – Western Australia
- Monotaxis grandiflora Endl. – Western Australia
- Monotaxis linifolia Brongn. – New South Wales
- Monotaxis luteiflora F.Muell. – Western Australia, South Australia, Northern Territory
- Monotaxis macrophylla Benth. – Queensland, New South Wales
- Monotaxis occidentalis Endl. – Western Australia
- Monotaxis paxii Grüning – Western Australia
- Monotaxis tenuis Airy Shaw – N Western Australia, N Northern Territory
