= Moultonianthus =

Conservation status
- Least Concern (IUCN 3.1)

Scientific classification
- Kingdom: Plantae
- Clade: Tracheophytes
- Clade: Angiosperms
- Clade: Eudicots
- Clade: Rosids
- Order: Malpighiales
- Family: Euphorbiaceae
- Subfamily: Acalyphoideae
- Tribe: Erismantheae
- Genus: Moultonianthus; Merr.
- Species: M. leembruggianus

Binomial name
- Moultonianthus leembruggianus (Boerl. & Koord.) Steenis

Synonyms
- Erismanthus leembruggianus Boerl. & Koord. Moultonianthus borneensis Merr. (type species)

Genus of plant in the family Euphorbiaceae

Moultonianthus is a monotypic plant genus in the family Euphorbiaceae first described as a genus in 1916. The only known species is Moultonianthus leembruggianus, native to Borneo and Sumatra.
