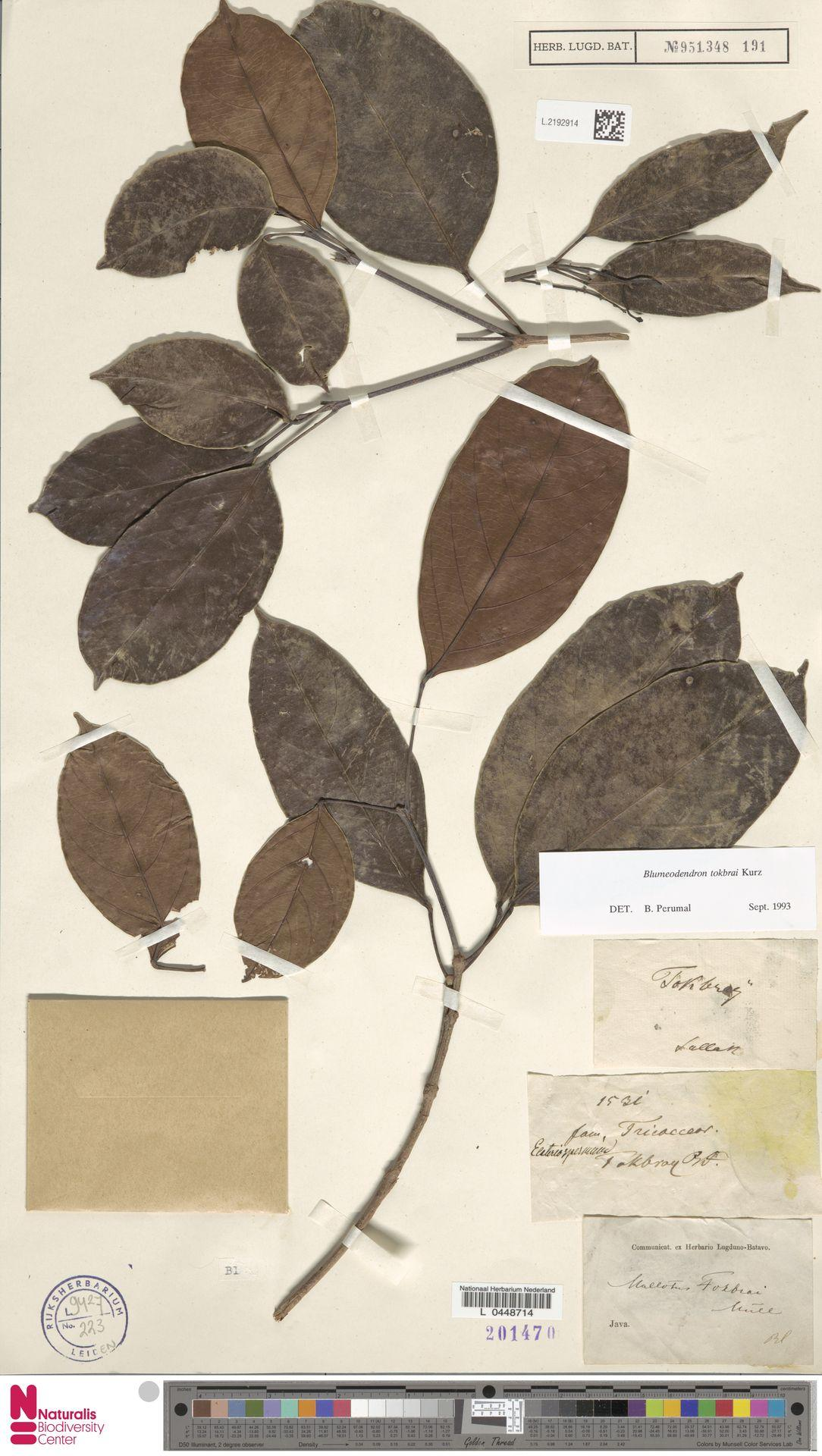
- Blumeodendron tokbrai specimen at Naturalis Biodiversity Center, Netherlands

Scientific classification
- Kingdom: Plantae
- Clade: Tracheophytes
- Clade: Angiosperms
- Clade: Eudicots
- Clade: Rosids
- Order: Malpighiales
- Family: Euphorbiaceae
- Subfamily: Acalyphoideae
- Tribe: Pycnocomeae
- Subtribe: Blumeodendrinae
- Genus: Blumeodendron (Müll.Arg.) Kurz

Synonyms
- Mallotus sect. Blumeodendron Müll. Arg.

= Blumeodendron =

Genus of trees

Blumeodendron is a genus of dioecious trees of the family Euphorbiaceae first described as a genus in 1873. It is widespread across much of Southeast Asia and Papuasia.

== Species ==
Species accepted, as of March 2021, are:

- Blumeodendron borneense Pax & K.Hoffm. - Borneo & Peninsular Malaysia (Perak)
- Blumeodendron bullatum Airy Shaw - southwest Sarawak, Malaysia
- Blumeodendron endocarpum Ottens & Welzen - West Papua to Sulawesi
- Blumeodendron gesinus Ottens - Sabah, Malaysia
- Blumeodendron kurzii (Hook.f.) J.J.Sm. ex Koord. & Valeton - Philippines to Jawa to Myanmar
- Blumeodendron papuanum Pax & K.Hoffm. - New Guinea
- Blumeodendron philippinense Merr. & Rolfe - Luzon, Philippines
- Blumeodendron subrotundifolium (Elmer) Merr. - Philippines to Sumatera to Thailand
- Blumeodendron tokbrai (Blume) Kurz - Nicobar Is and Thailand to Maluku and Philippines

Formerly included: moved to Paracroton

- B. muelleri - Paracroton pendulus
