= Droceloncia =

Scientific classification
- Kingdom: Plantae
- Clade: Tracheophytes
- Clade: Angiosperms
- Clade: Eudicots
- Clade: Rosids
- Order: Malpighiales
- Family: Euphorbiaceae
- Subfamily: Acalyphoideae
- Tribe: Pycnocomeae
- Subtribe: Pycnocominae
- Genus: Droceloncia; J.Léonard
- Species: D. rigidifolia

Binomial name
- Droceloncia rigidifolia (Baill.) J.Léonard

Synonyms
- Pycnocoma rigidifolia Baill.; Wetriaria rigidifolia (Baill.) Pax & K.Hoffm.; Argomuellera rigidifolia (Baill.) Pax & K.Hoffm.

Genus of plants

Droceloncia is a genus of plant of the family Euphorbiaceae first described as a genus in 1959. It contains only one known species, Droceloncia rigidifolia, native to Madagascar and to the nearby island of Mayotte.
