= Manniophyton =

Scientific classification
- Kingdom: Plantae
- Clade: Tracheophytes
- Clade: Angiosperms
- Clade: Eudicots
- Clade: Rosids
- Order: Malpighiales
- Family: Euphorbiaceae
- Subfamily: Crotonoideae
- Tribe: Aleuritideae
- Subtribe: Crotonogyninae
- Genus: Manniophyton; Müll.Arg.
- Species: M. fulvum

Binomial name
- Manniophyton fulvum Müll.Arg.

Synonyms
- Manniophyton africanum var. fulvum (Müll.Arg.) Hutch.; Manniophyton africanum Müll.Arg.; Manniophyton chevalieri Beille; Manniophyton wildemanii Beille; Manniophyton tricuspe Pierre ex A.Chev

Genus of flowering plants

Manniophyton is a genus of lianas of the spurge family (Euphorbiaceae) described as a genus in 1864. It contains only one known species, Manniophyton fulvum, native to tropical western and central Africa from Guinea to Angola. It is dioecious.

Formerly included

moved to Crotonogyne

- Manniophyton angustifolium - Crotonogyne parvifolia
