= Grossera =

Scientific classification
- Kingdom: Plantae
- Clade: Tracheophytes
- Clade: Angiosperms
- Clade: Eudicots
- Clade: Rosids
- Order: Malpighiales
- Family: Euphorbiaceae
- Subfamily: Crotonoideae
- Tribe: Aleuritideae
- Subtribe: Grosserinae
- Genus: Grossera; Pax

Synonyms
- Fourneaua Pierre ex Prain

Genus of flowering plants

Grossera is a plant genus of the family Euphorbiaceae first described as a genus in 1903. It is native to Madagascar and to mainland tropical Africa. It is dioecious.

Species

1. Grossera angustifolia Barbera&Riina - Equatorial Guinea
2. Grossera elongata Hutch. - Príncipe
3. Grossera glomeratospicata J.Léonard - East Congo
4. Grossera macrantha Pax - East Congo, West Congo, Cameroon, Central African Rep.
5. Grossera major Pax - Cameroon
6. Grossera multinervis J.Léonard - East Congo, São Tomé
7. Grossera paniculata Pax - West Congo, Cameroon, Gabon
8. Grossera perrieri Leandri - Madagascar
9. Grossera vignei Hoyle - Ivory Coast, Ghana, West Congo

formerly included

moved to Cavacoa

1. G. aurea - Cavacoa aurea
2. G. baldwinii - Cavacoa baldwinii
3. G. quintasii - Cavacoa quintasii
