= Ditta =

Scientific classification
- Kingdom: Plantae
- Clade: Tracheophytes
- Clade: Angiosperms
- Clade: Eudicots
- Clade: Rosids
- Order: Malpighiales
- Family: Euphorbiaceae
- Subfamily: Crotonoideae
- Tribe: Adenoclineae
- Subtribe: Adenoclininae
- Genus: Ditta; Griseb.

Genus of flowering plants

Ditta is a genus of plants, under the family Euphorbiaceae first described as a genus in 1861. It is native to the Greater Antilles in the Caribbean.

Species

1. Ditta maestrensis Borhidi - Sierra Maestra in SE Cuba
2. Ditta myricoides Griseb. - Cuba, Hispaniola, Puerto Rico
