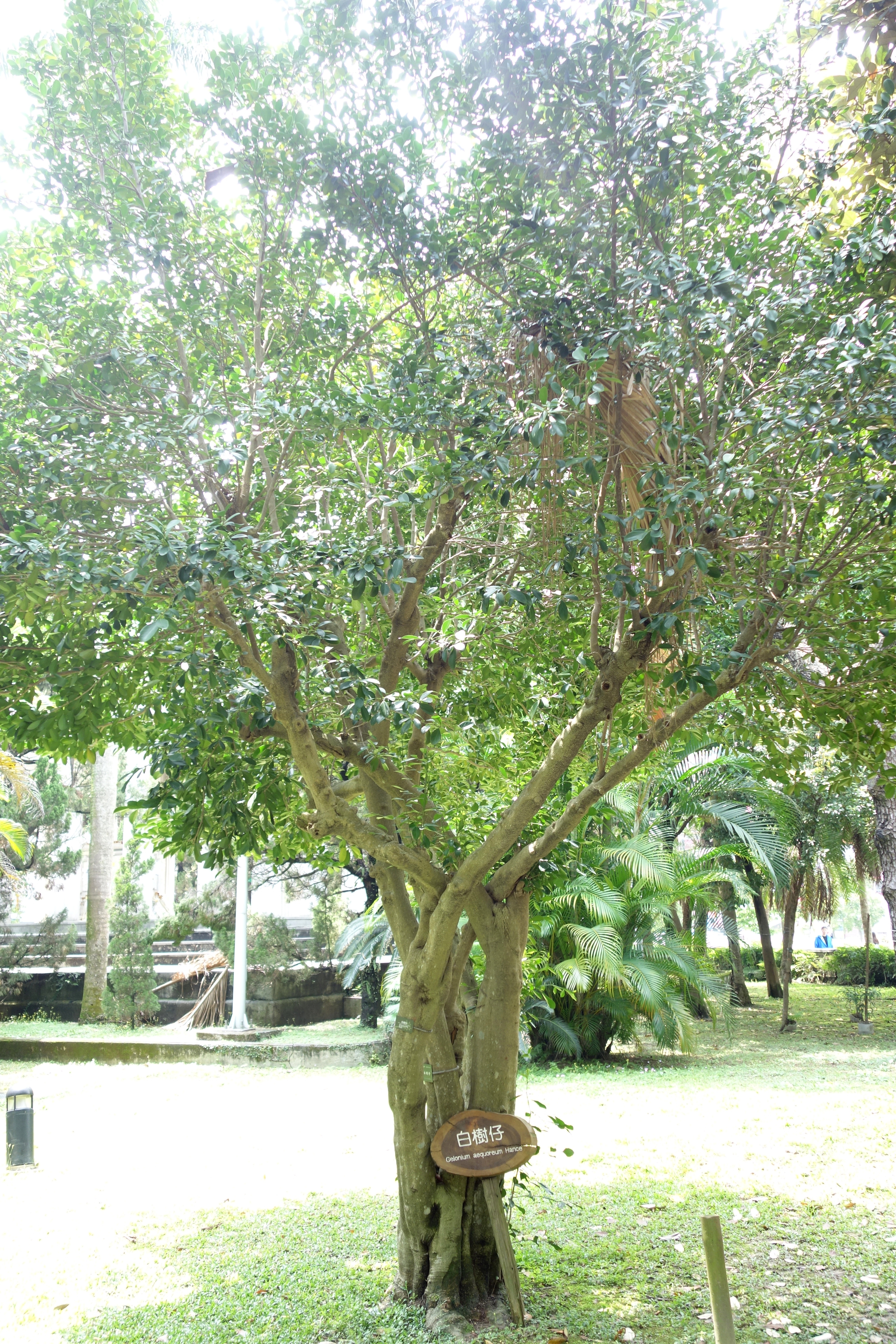
- Suregada aequorea

Scientific classification
- Kingdom: Plantae
- Clade: Tracheophytes
- Clade: Angiosperms
- Clade: Eudicots
- Clade: Rosids
- Order: Malpighiales
- Family: Euphorbiaceae
- Subfamily: Crotonoideae
- Tribe: Gelonieae

Genera
- Cladogelonium; Suregada

= Gelonieae =

Tribe of flowering plants

Gelonieae is a dioecious flowering plant of tribe of the subfamily Crotonoideae, under the family Euphorbiaceae (spurge family). It comprises 2 genera. Grows in Africa, Madagascar and in tropical Asia.

== See also ==
- Taxonomy of the Euphorbiaceae
