= Benoistia =

Scientific classification
- Kingdom: Plantae
- Clade: Tracheophytes
- Clade: Angiosperms
- Clade: Eudicots
- Clade: Rosids
- Order: Malpighiales
- Family: Euphorbiaceae
- Subfamily: Crotonoideae
- Tribe: Aleuritideae
- Subtribe: Benoistiinae
- Genus: Benoistia; H.Perrier & Leandri

Genus of flowering plants

Benoistia is a genus of shrubs or trees of the spurge family (Euphorbiaceae) and the monotypic subtribe Benoistiinae. It was first described as a genus in 1939. The entire genus is endemic to Madagascar. It is dioecious.

Species

1. Benoistia orientalis Radcl.-Sm. - N + E Madagascar
2. Benoistia perrieri H.Perrier & Leandri - Madagascar
3. Benoistia sambiranensis H.Perrier & Leandri - N Madagascar
