= T. microphyllum =

T. microphyllum may refer to:

- Tanacetum microphyllum, a plant species found in Spain and Portugal
- Tetrorchidium microphyllum, a plant species endemic to Panama

== See also ==
- Microphyllum
