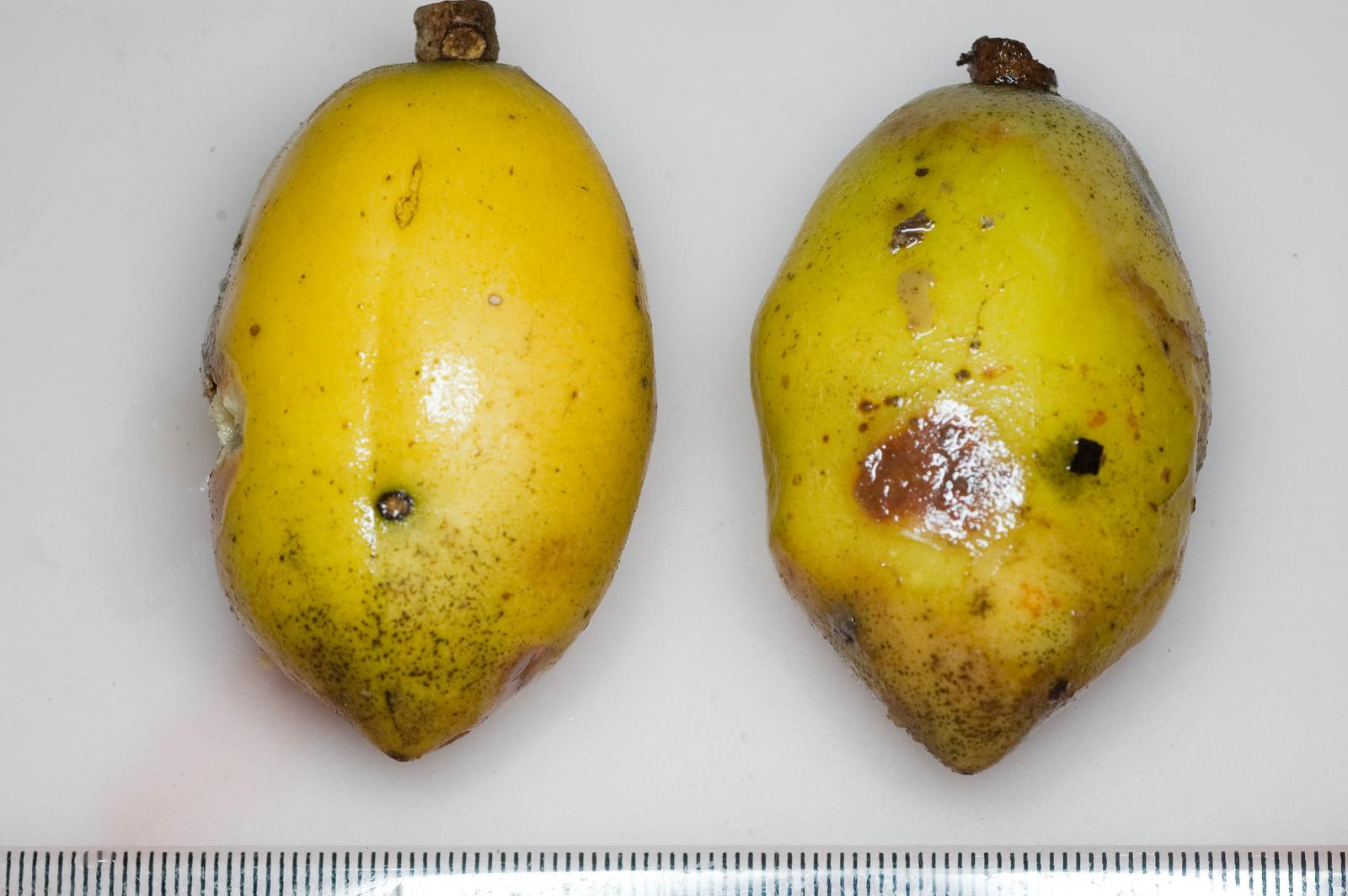
- Glycydendron amazonicum fruit

Scientific classification
- Kingdom: Plantae
- Clade: Tracheophytes
- Clade: Angiosperms
- Clade: Eudicots
- Clade: Rosids
- Order: Malpighiales
- Family: Euphorbiaceae
- Subfamily: Crotonoideae
- Tribe: Adenoclineae
- Subtribe: Adenoclininae
- Genus: Glycydendron; Ducke

= Glycydendron =

Genus of flowering plants

Glycydendron is a genus of plants in the family Euphorbiaceae, first described as a genus in 1922. It is native to South America.

Species

1. Glycydendron amazonicum Ducke - French Guinea, Suriname, Guyana, Ecuador, Peru, Bolivia, northwestern Brazil, possibly Colombia
2. Glycydendron espiritosantense Kuhlm, - State of Espírito Santo in Brazil
