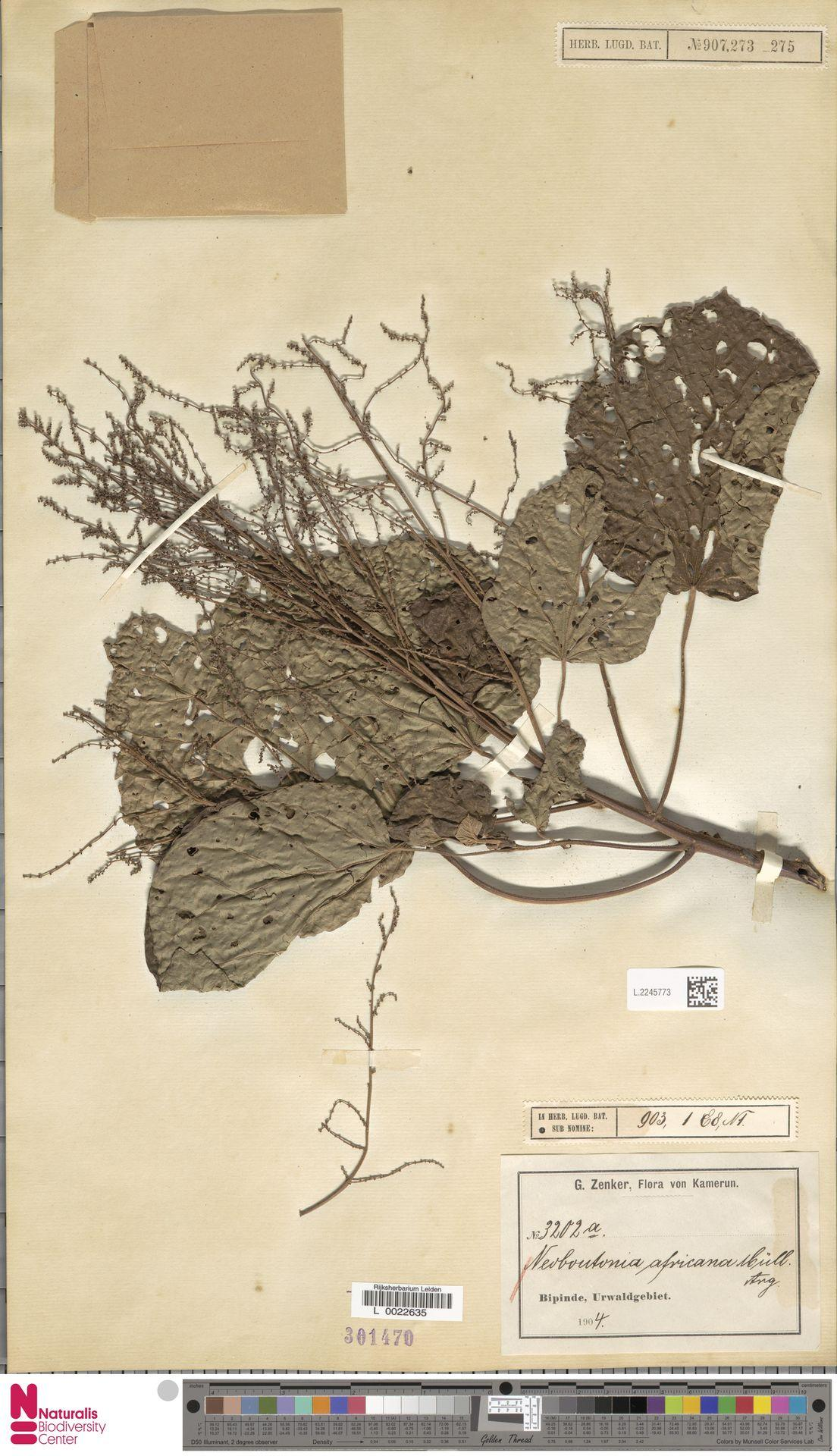
- Neoboutonia mannii specimen at Naturalis Biodiversity Center

Scientific classification
- Kingdom: Plantae
- Clade: Tracheophytes
- Clade: Angiosperms
- Clade: Eudicots
- Clade: Rosids
- Order: Malpighiales
- Family: Euphorbiaceae
- Subfamily: Crotonoideae
- Tribe: Aleuritideae
- Subtribe: Neoboutoniinae
- Genus: Neoboutonia; Airy Shaw

Type species
- Neoboutonia africana (syn of N. melleri) Airy Shaw

= Neoboutonia =

Genus of flowering plants

Neoboutonia is a plant genus of the family Euphorbiaceae first described as a genus in 1864. It is the only genus in subtribe Neoboutoniinae, and native to tropical Africa. It is dioecious.

Species

1. Neoboutonia macrocalyx Pax - Burundi, Cameroon, Rwanda, Zaire, Kenya, Tanzania, Uganda, Malawi, Zambia, Zimbabwe
2. Neoboutonia mannii Benth. & Hook.f. - tropical Africa from Liberia to Mozambique
3. Neoboutonia melleri (Müll.Arg.) Prain - tropical Africa from Nigeria to Mozambique
