= Cladogelonium =

Scientific classification
- Kingdom: Plantae
- Clade: Tracheophytes
- Clade: Angiosperms
- Clade: Eudicots
- Clade: Rosids
- Order: Malpighiales
- Family: Euphorbiaceae
- Subfamily: Crotonoideae
- Tribe: Gelonieae
- Genus: Cladogelonium; Leandri
- Species: C. madagascariense

Binomial name
- Cladogelonium madagascariense Leandri

Genus of flowering plants

Cladogelonium is a monotypic plant genus of the family Euphorbiaceae first described as a genus in 1939.

The only known species is the shrub Cladogelonium madagascariense. It is found in the Analamerana Special Reserve in northern Madagascar.
