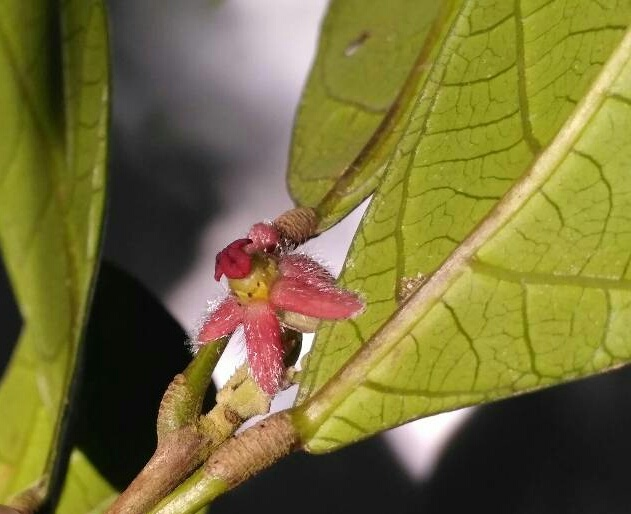
- Garcia parviflora

Scientific classification
- Kingdom: Plantae
- Clade: Tracheophytes
- Clade: Angiosperms
- Clade: Eudicots
- Clade: Rosids
- Order: Malpighiales
- Family: Euphorbiaceae
- Subfamily: Crotonoideae
- Tribe: Aleuritideae
- Subtribe: Garciinae
- Genus: Garcia; Vahl ex Rohr

Synonyms
- Carcia Raeusch.

= Garcia (plant) =

Genus of flowering plants

Garcia is a plant genus of the family Euphorbiaceae and of the monotypic subtribe Garciinae, first described as a genus in 1792. It is native to Central America, Mexico, Colombia, and Venezuela, and also naturalized in some of the West Indies.

Species

1. Garcia nutans Vahl ex Rohr - Mexico from Sinaloa and San Luis Potosí to Chiapas + Yucatán, Central America, Colombia, Venezuela
2. Garcia parviflora Lundell - Chiapas, Tabasco, Veracruz
