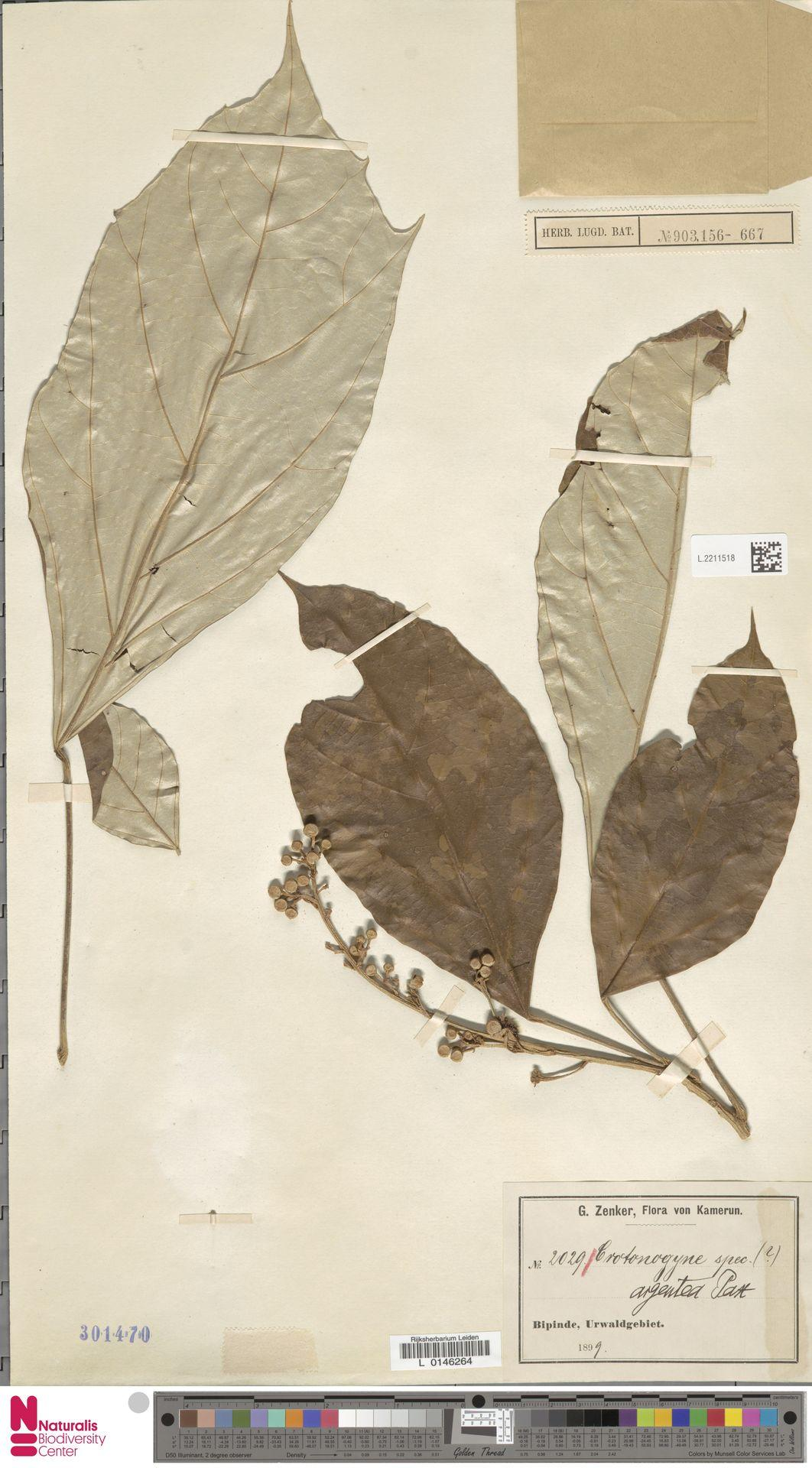
- Cyrtogonone argentea

Scientific classification
- Kingdom: Plantae
- Clade: Tracheophytes
- Clade: Angiosperms
- Clade: Eudicots
- Clade: Rosids
- Order: Malpighiales
- Family: Euphorbiaceae
- Subfamily: Crotonoideae
- Tribe: Aleuritideae
- Subtribe: Crotonogyninae
- Genus: Crotonogyne; Müll.Arg.

Synonyms
- Neomanniophyton Pax & K.Hoffm.

= Crotonogyne =

Genus of flowering plants

Crotonogyne is a shrub of the spurge family (Euphorbiaceae) first described as a genus in 1864. It is native to western and central Africa. It is dioecious.

Species

1. Crotonogyne angustifolia Pax - Gabon
2. Crotonogyne caterviflora N.E.Br. - Guinea, Sierra Leone, Liberia, Ivory Coast
3. Crotonogyne chevalieri (Beille) Keay - Ivory Coast
4. Crotonogyne gabunensis Pax - Gabon, Republic of Congo
5. Crotonogyne giorgii De Wild. - Republic of Congo, Democratic Republic of Congo, Central African Republic
6. Crotonogyne ikelembensis (De Wild.) Prain - Democratic Republic of Congo
7. Crotonogyne impedita Prain - Cameroon
8. Crotonogyne lasiocarpa Prain - Equatorial Guinea
9. Crotonogyne laurentii De Wild. - Democratic Republic of Congo
10. Crotonogyne ledermanniana (Pax & K.Hoffm.) Pax & K.Hoffm. - Cameroon
11. Crotonogyne manniana Müll.Arg. - Guinea, Cabinda Province, Gabon, São Tomé and Príncipe, Republic of Congo, Democratic Republic of Congo
12. Crotonogyne parvifolia Prain - Gabon
13. Crotonogyne poggei Pax - Republic of Congo, Democratic Republic of Congo, Central African Republic
14. Crotonogyne preussii Pax - Nigeria, Cameroon
15. Crotonogyne strigosa Prain - Nigeria, Republic of Congo
16. Crotonogyne zenkeri Pax - Republic of Congo, Central African Republic, Gabon, Cameroon

Formerly included

moved to other genera: Cyrtogonone

- Crotonogyne argentea - Cyrtogonone argentea
