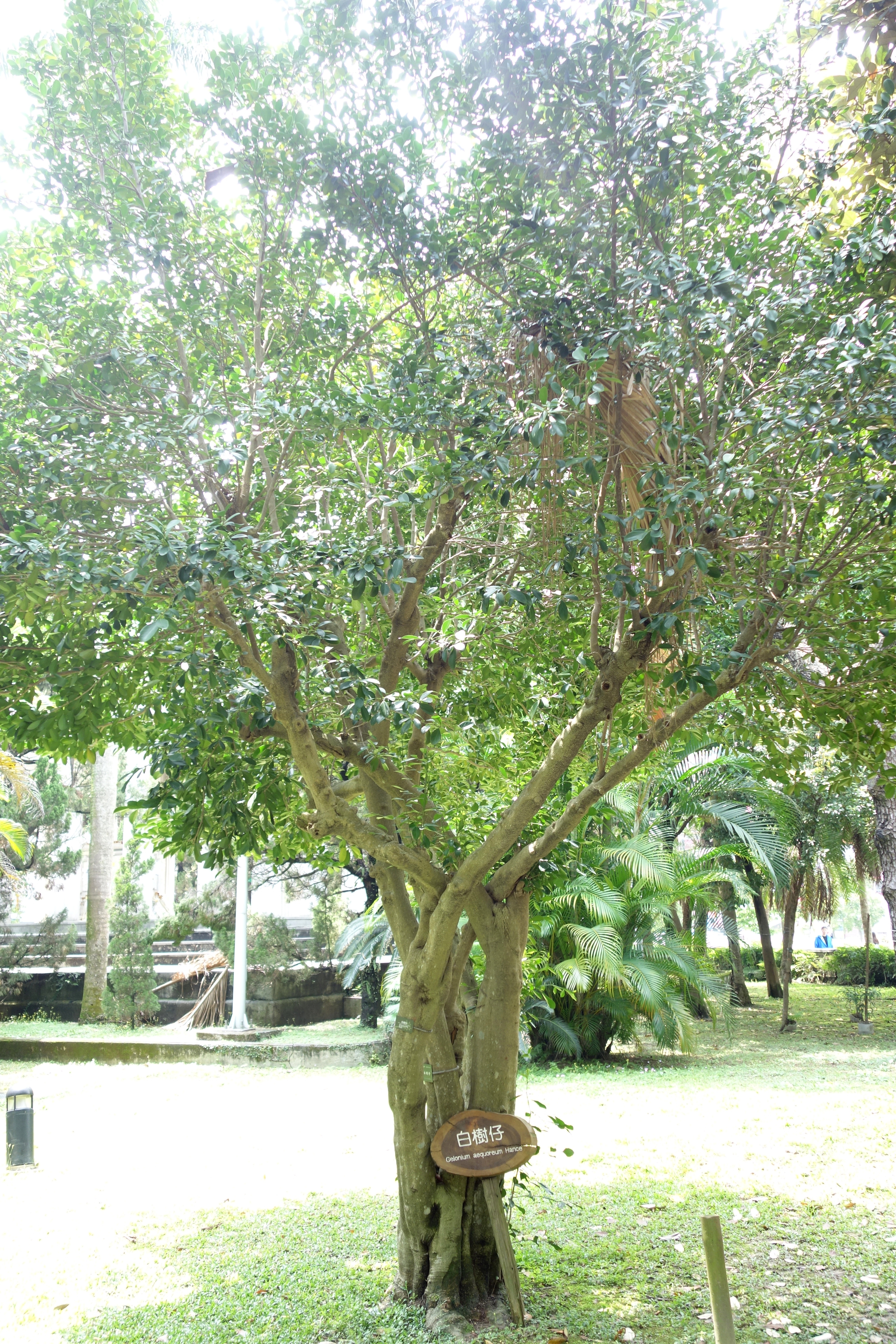
- Suregada aequorea

Scientific classification
- Kingdom: Plantae
- Clade: Tracheophytes
- Clade: Angiosperms
- Clade: Eudicots
- Clade: Rosids
- Order: Malpighiales
- Family: Euphorbiaceae
- Subfamily: Crotonoideae
- Tribe: Gelonieae
- Genus: Suregada; Roxb. ex Rottler

Synonyms
- Ceratophorus Sond.; Erythrocarpus Blume; Gelonium Roxb. ex Willd.; Owataria Matsum.; Saragodra Steud.

= Suregada =

Genus of flowering plants

Suregada is a plant genus of the family Euphorbiaceae, first described as a genus in 1803. It is native to tropical and subtropical regions of Africa, the Indian subcontinent, China, Southeast Asia, Australia, and certain oceanic islands.

Species

1. Suregada adenophora - Madagascar
2. Suregada aequorea - Taiwan
3. Suregada africana - Mozambique, Eswatini, South Africa
4. Suregada boiviniana - Madagascar
5. Suregada borbonica - Réunion
6. Suregada bracteata - N Madagascar
7. Suregada calcicola - Sarawak
8. Suregada capuronii - Madagascar
9. Suregada celastroides - Madagascar
10. Suregada cicerosperma - Vietnam
11. Suregada comorensis - Comoros
12. Suregada croizatiana - Democratic Republic of the Congo
13. Suregada decidua - W Madagascar
14. Suregada eucleoides - SC Madagascar
15. Suregada gaultheriifolia - EC Madagascar
16. Suregada glomerulata - S China, SE Asia, New Guinea, N Territory
17. Suregada gossweileri - DRC, Angola
18. Suregada grandiflora - E Madagascar
19. Suregada humbertii - EC Madagascar
20. Suregada ivorensis - Ivory Coast
21. Suregada lanceolata - S India, Sri Lanka
22. Suregada laurina - E Madagascar
23. Suregada lithoxyla - Tanzania
24. Suregada multiflora - India, Bangladesh, SE Asia
25. Suregada nigricaulis - EC Madagascar
26. Suregada occidentalis - Ivory Coast, Ghana, Nigeria
27. Suregada perrieri - E Madagascar
28. Suregada procera - E + C + SE + S Africa
29. Suregada racemulosa - Philippines
30. Suregada stenophylla - Philippines
31. Suregada zanzibariensis - Madagascar; from Somalia to KwaZulu-Natal

formerly included

moved to Tetrorchidium

- Suregada angolensis - Tetrorchidium didymostemon
