= Erythrocarpus =

Erythrocarpus may refer to:

- Erythrocarpus Blume, a synonym of the euphorb genus Suregada
- Erythrocarpus M.Roem, a synonym of the passionflower genus Adenia
