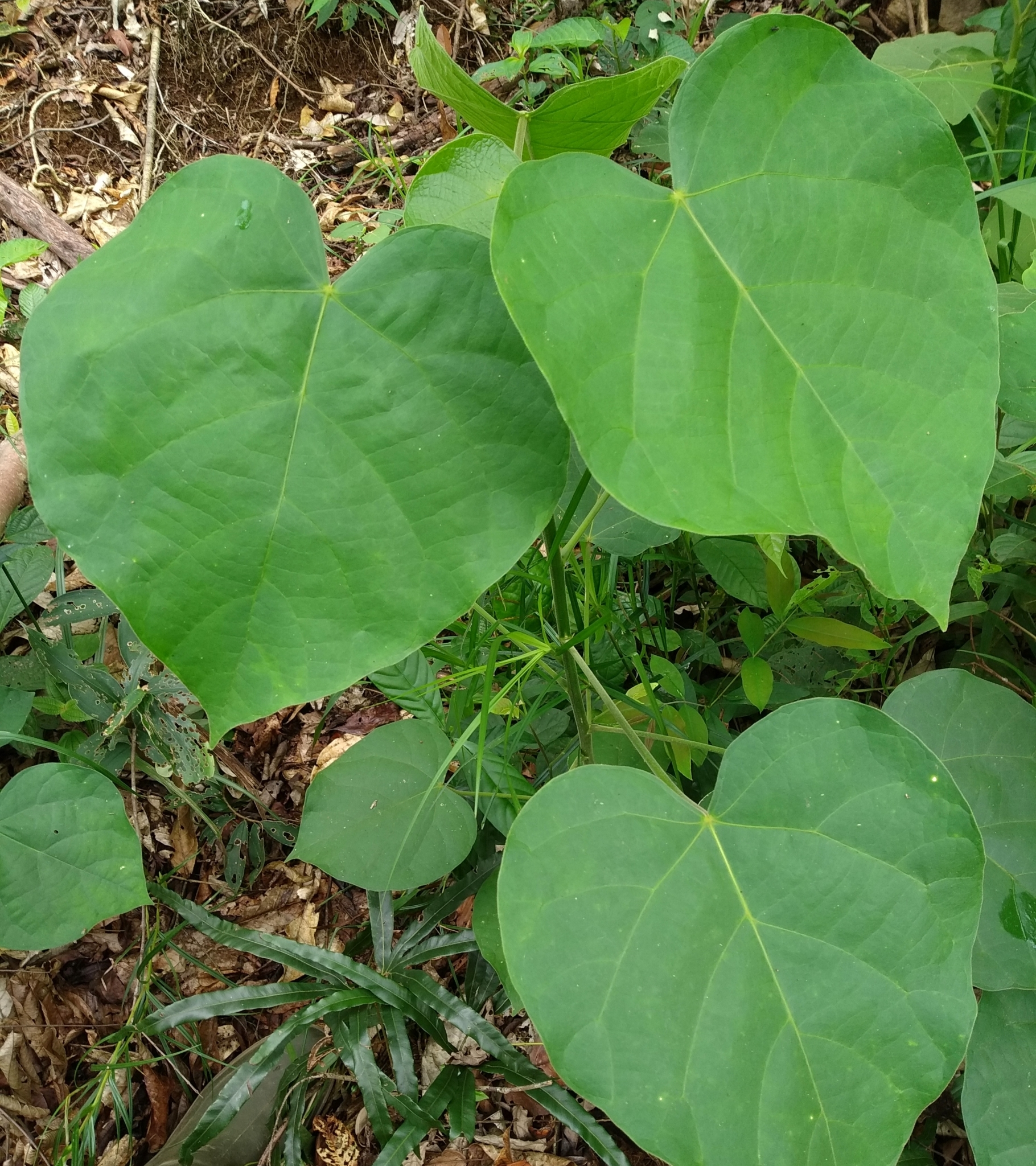
- Endospermum diadenum

Scientific classification
- Kingdom: Plantae
- Clade: Embryophytes
- Clade: Tracheophytes
- Clade: Spermatophytes
- Clade: Angiosperms
- Clade: Eudicots
- Clade: Rosids
- Order: Malpighiales
- Family: Euphorbiaceae
- Subfamily: Crotonoideae
- Tribe: Adenoclineae
- Subtribe: Endosperminae
- Genus: Endospermum; Benth.

Synonyms
- Capellenia Teijsm. & Binn.

= Endospermum =

Genus of flowering plants

Endospermum is a genus of plants in the family Euphorbiaceae and the monotypic subtribe Endosperminae. It was first described as a genus in 1861 by George Bentham, and comprises 11 species. Plants in the genus are dioecious, rarely monoecious trees native to regions from India to China, Southeast Asia, Papuasia, Queensland, and some islands of the western Pacific.

== Species ==
As of July 2026, Plants of the World Online recognise 11 species as follows:

- Endospermum chinense – S China, Himalayas, N Indochina
- Endospermum diadenum – Andaman Is, S Thailand, W Malaysia, Sumatra, Borneo
- Endospermum domatiophorum – Papua New Guinea
- Endospermum macrophyllum – Fiji
- Endospermum medullosum – Maluku, New Guinea, Solomon Is, Bismarck A, Santa Cruz Is, Vanuatu
- Endospermum moluccanum – Maluku, Sulawesi, New Guinea, Solomon Is, Bismarck A
- Endospermum myrmecophilum – Papua New Guinea, Queensland
- Endospermum ovatum – Mindanao
- Endospermum peltatum – Andaman & Nicobar, Thailand, W Malaysia, Borneo, Philippines
- Endospermum quadriloculare – S Thailand, W Malaysia, Sumatra
- Endospermum robbieanum – Vanua Levu in Fiji

Formerly included

- Endospermum perakense King ex Hook.f. – Macaranga amissa Airy Shaw
