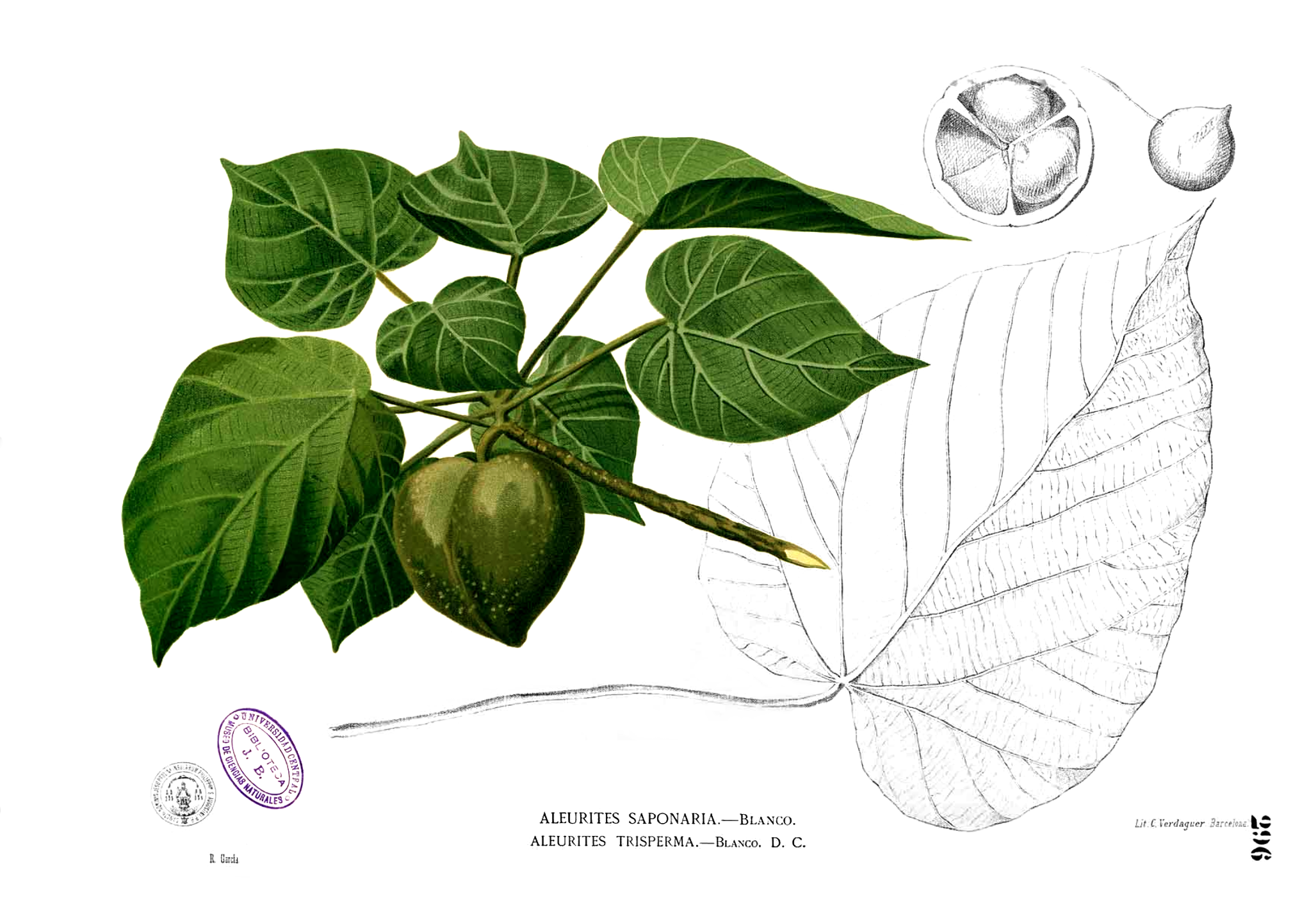
- Francisco Manuel Blanco plate

Conservation status
- Near Threatened (IUCN 3.1)

Scientific classification
- Kingdom: Plantae
- Clade: Embryophytes
- Clade: Tracheophytes
- Clade: Spermatophytes
- Clade: Angiosperms
- Clade: Eudicots
- Clade: Rosids
- Order: Malpighiales
- Family: Euphorbiaceae
- Subfamily: Crotonoideae
- Tribe: Aleuritideae
- Subtribe: Aleuritinae
- Genus: Reutealis; Airy Shaw
- Species: R. trisperma

Binomial name
- Reutealis trisperma (Blanco) Airy Shaw

= Reutealis =

Philippine tung

Genus of flowering plants

Reutealis is a monotypic plant genus in the family Euphorbiaceae. The single species, Reutealis trisperma is also known as Philippine tung. Reutealis trisperma is endemic to the Philippines and used as a timber species, although it is listed as a near-threatened species on the IUCN Red List.

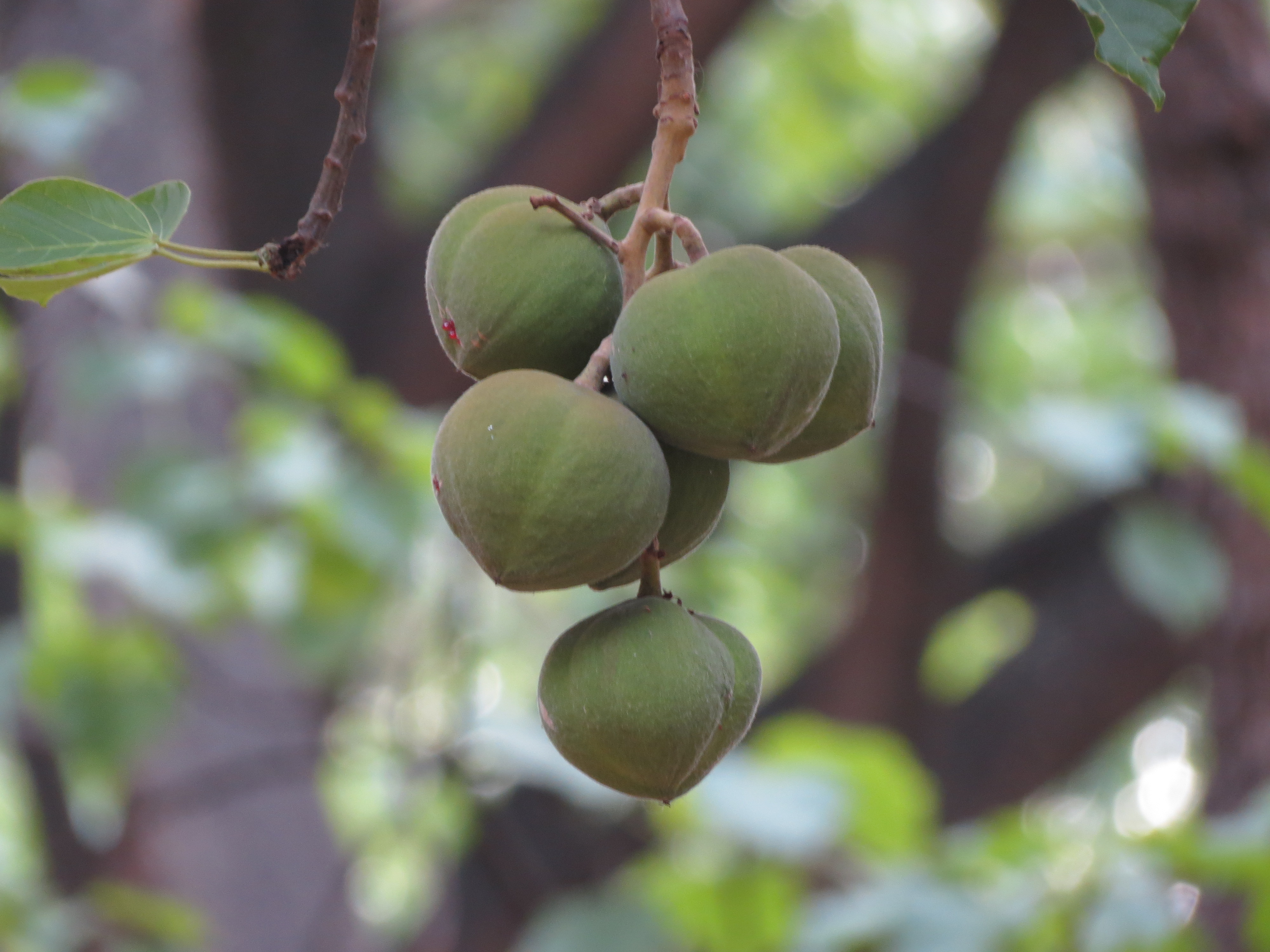
Reutealis trisperma fruit bunch

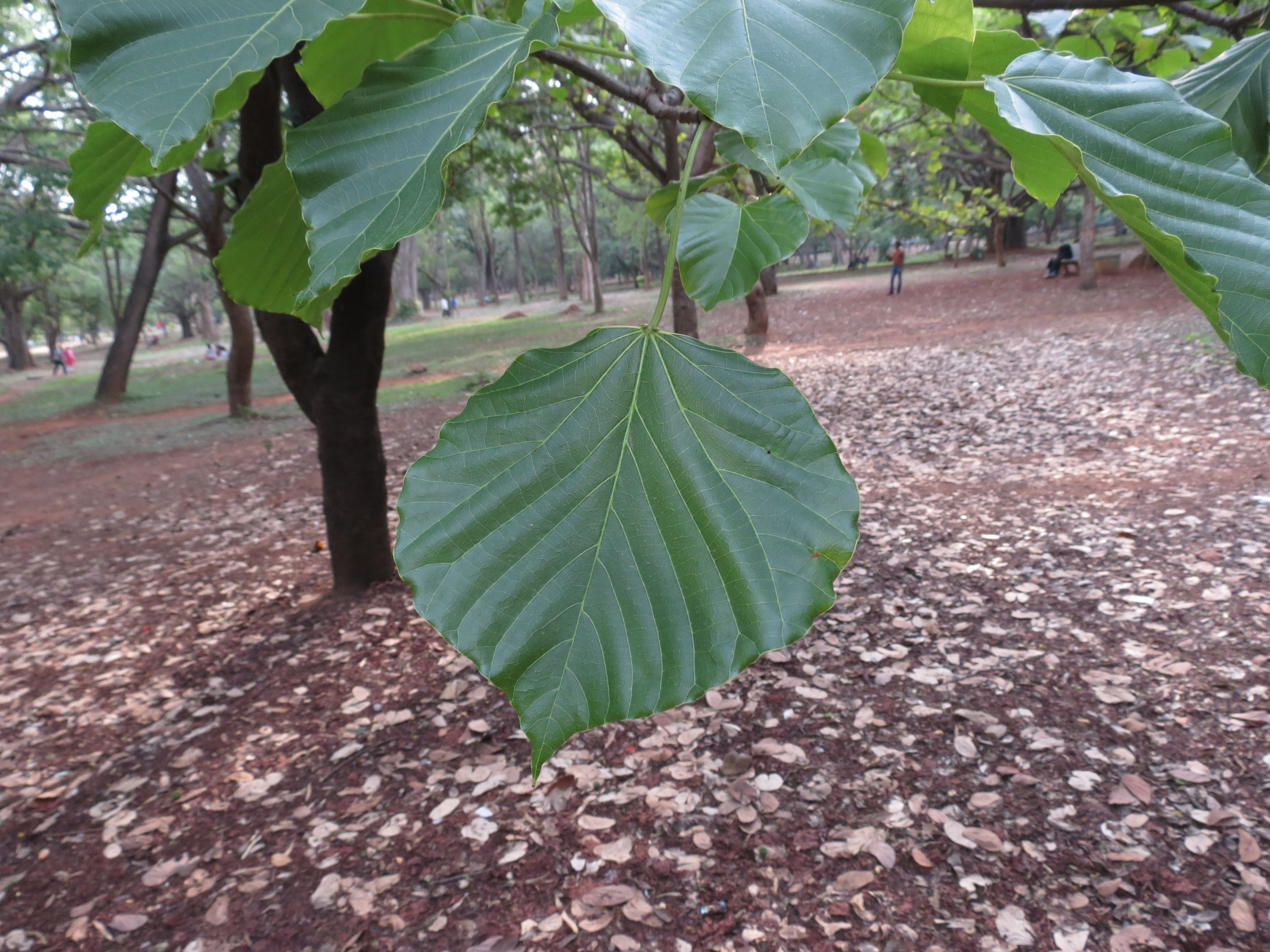
Reutealis trisperma leaf

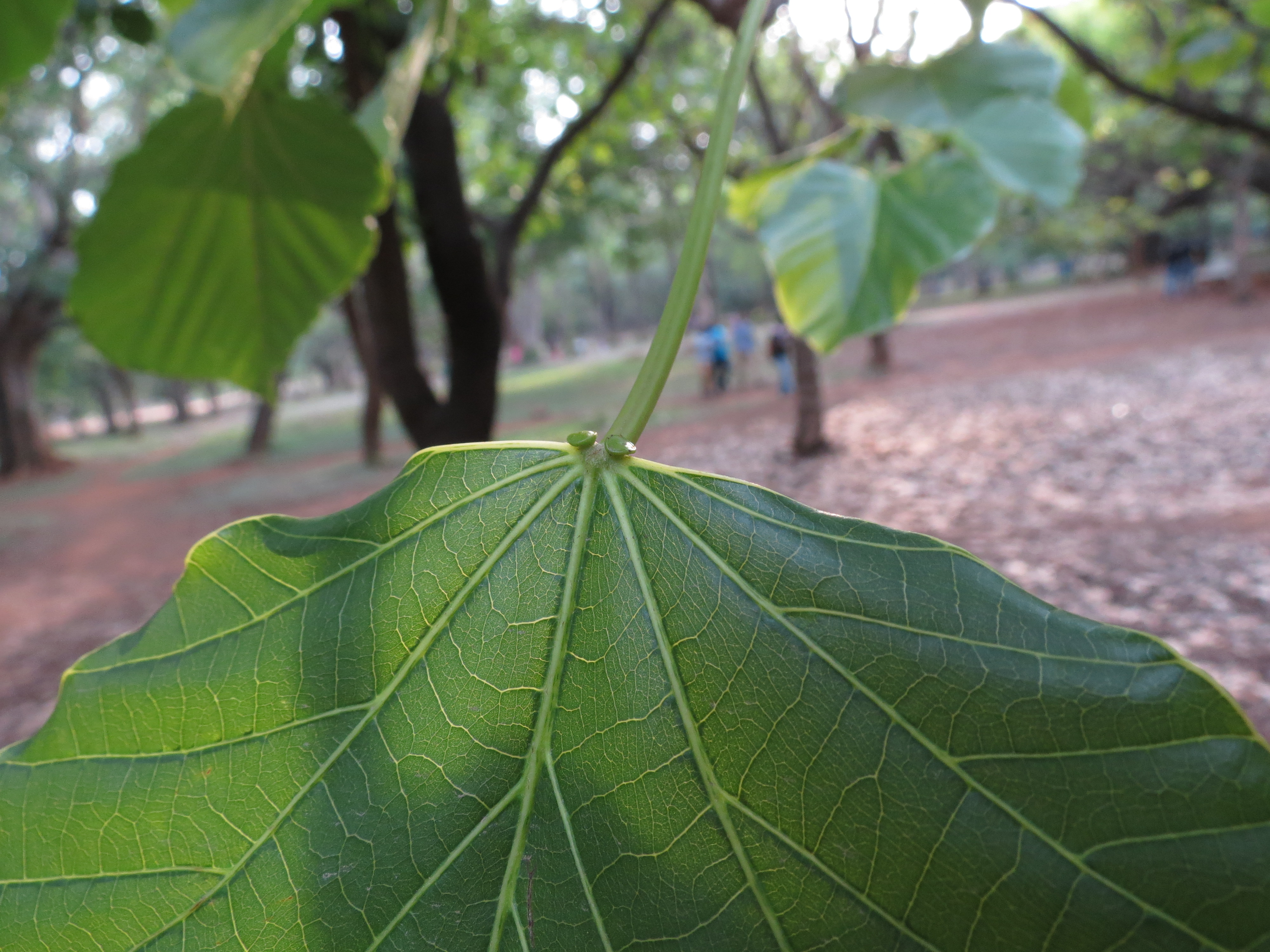
Reutealis trisperma leaf close up showing characteristics

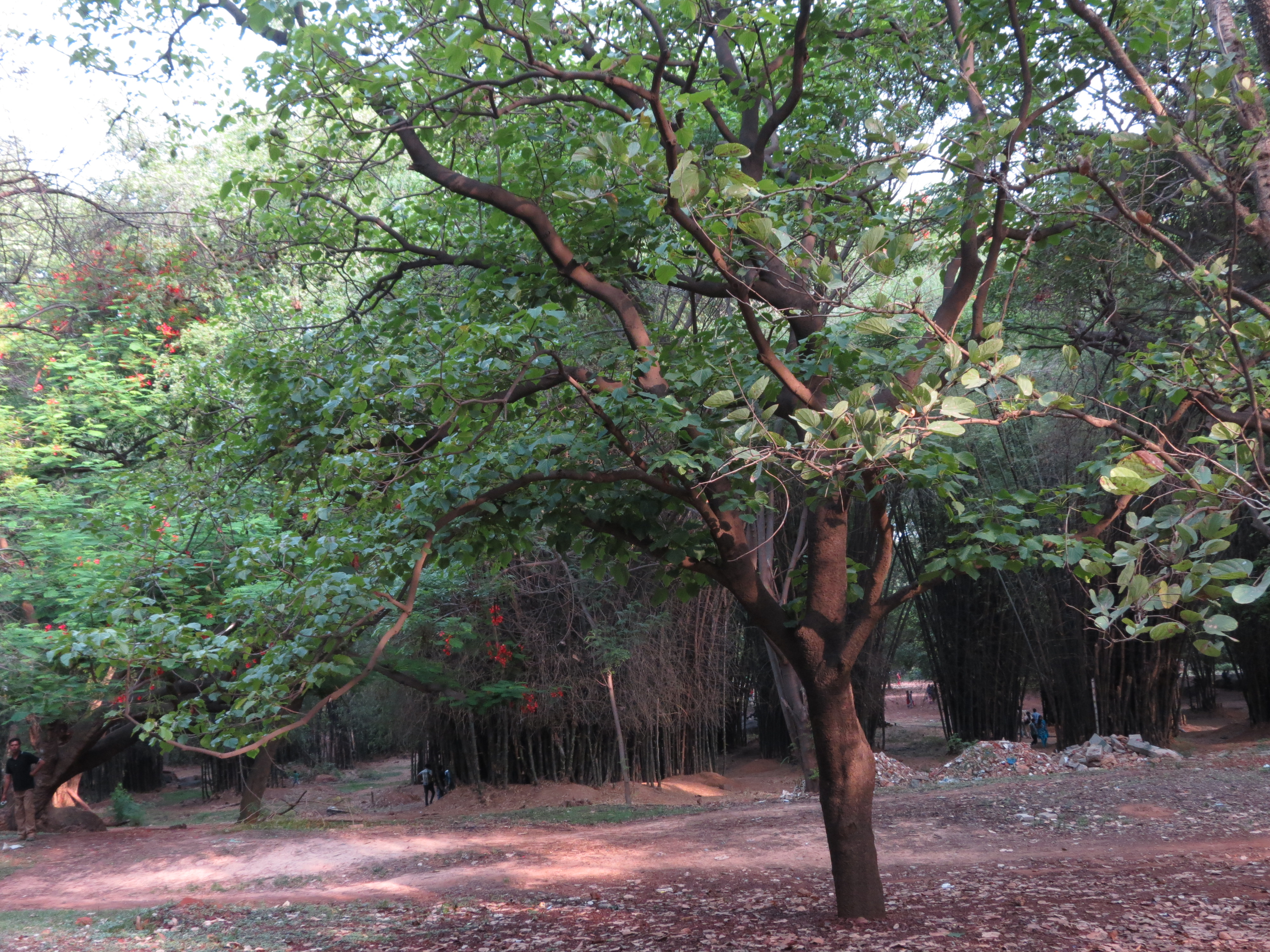
Reutealis trisperma tree in Cubbon park, Bangalore

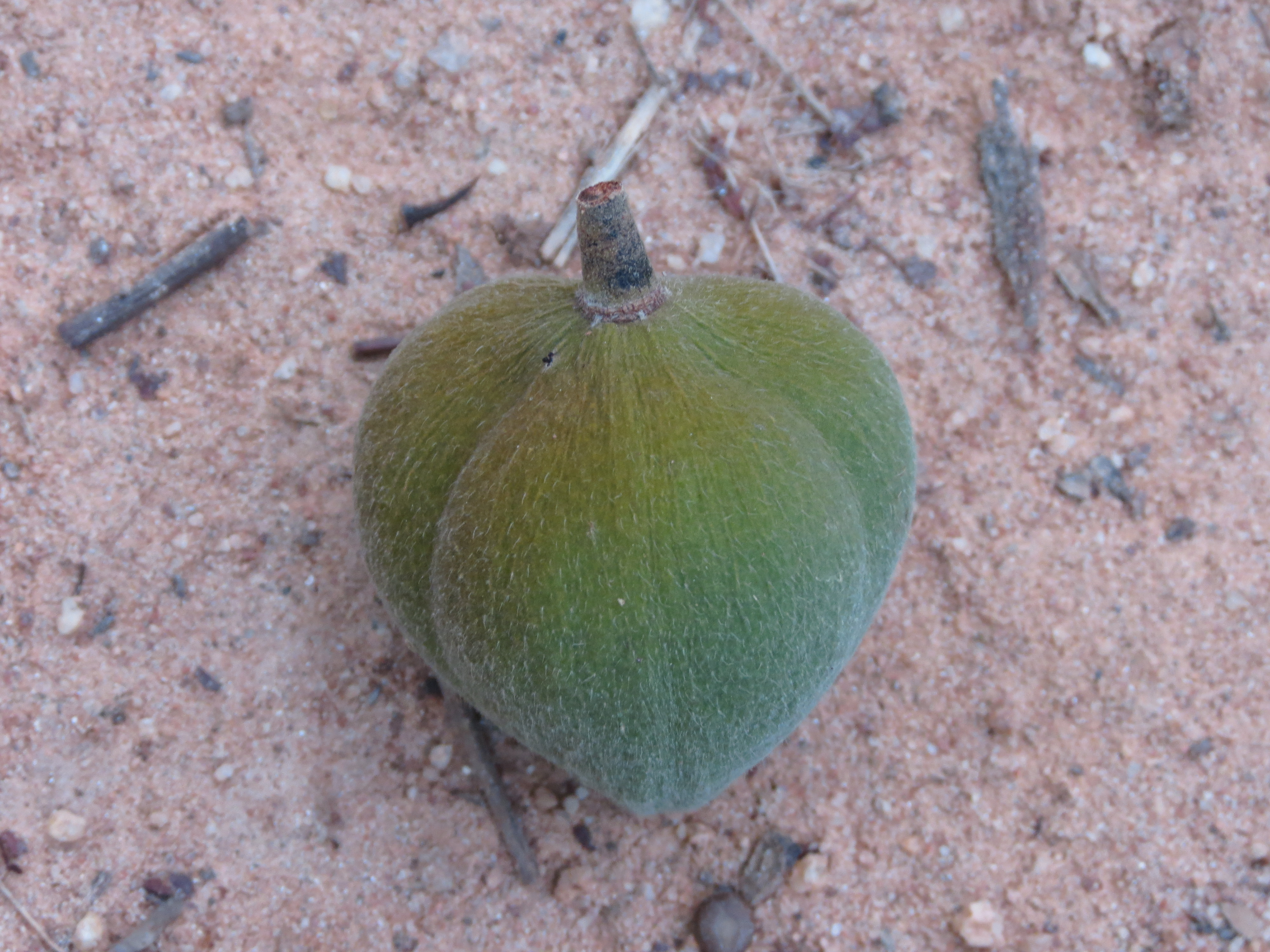
Reutealis trisperma fruit closeup
