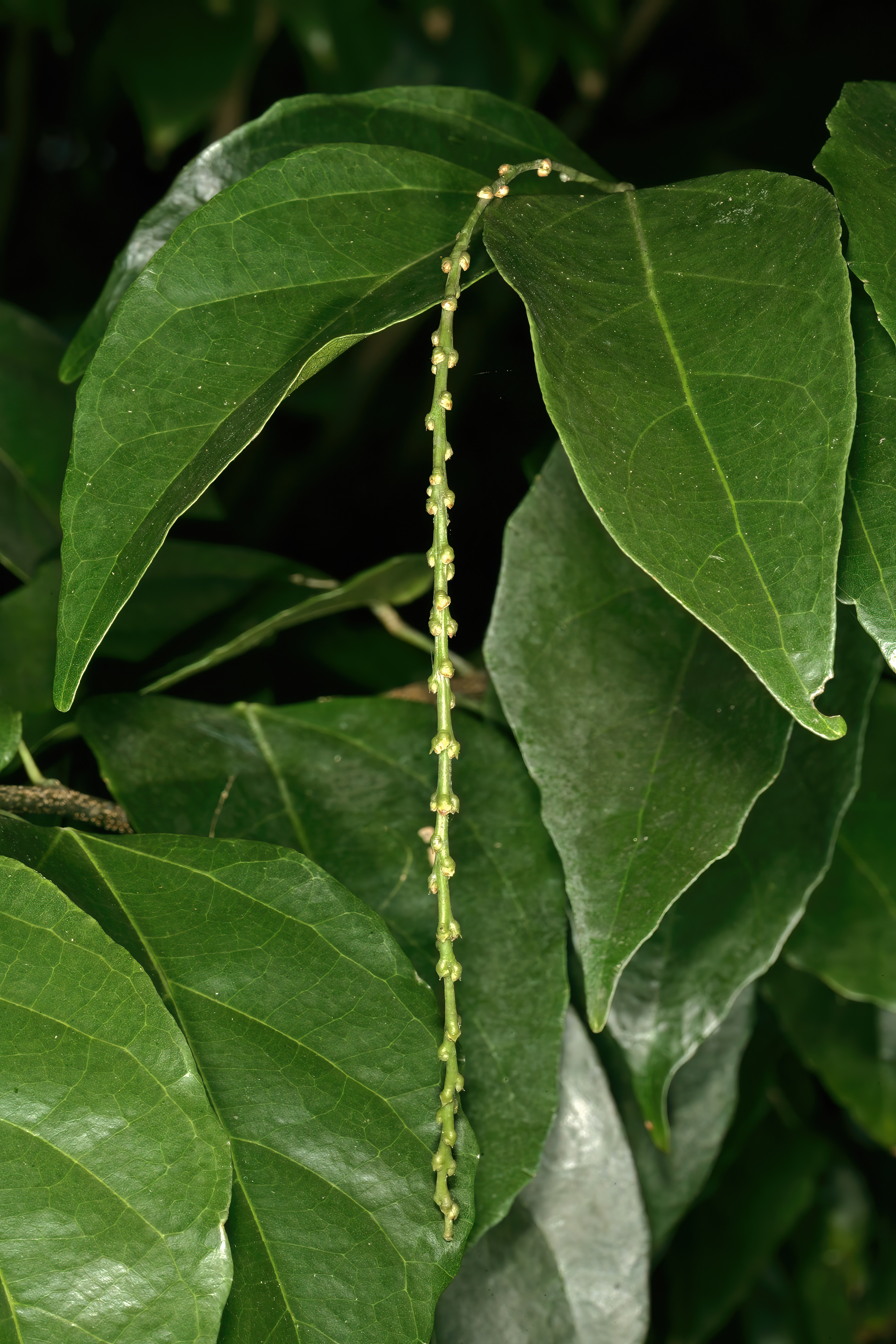
- Tannodia swynnertonii at Lowveld National Botanical Garden, South Africa

Scientific classification
- Kingdom: Plantae
- Clade: Tracheophytes
- Clade: Angiosperms
- Clade: Eudicots
- Clade: Rosids
- Order: Malpighiales
- Family: Euphorbiaceae
- Subfamily: Crotonoideae
- Tribe: Aleuritideae
- Subtribe: Grosserinae
- Genus: Tannodia; Baill.

Synonyms
- Tandonia Baill.; Holstia Pax, illegitimate name; Domohinea Leandri; Neoholstia Rauschert

= Tannodia =

Genus of flowering plants

Tannodia is a plant genus of the family Euphorbiaceae first described as a genus in 1861. It is native to Africa, Madagascar, and Comoros. It is dioecious.

Species

1. Tannodia congolensis - Zaïre
2. Tannodia cordifolia - Comoros, Madagascar
3. Tannodia grandiflora - Diana Region in Madagascar
4. Tannodia nitida - Atsinanana in Madagascar
5. Tannodia obovata - Atsinanana in Madagascar
6. Tannodia pennivenia - Atsinanana in Madagascar
7. Tannodia perrieri - Madagascar
8. Tannodia swynnertonii - Tanzania, Mozambique, Zimbabwe
9. Tannodia tenuifolia - Kenya, Tanzania, Malawi, Mozambique, Zimbabwe, Zambia
