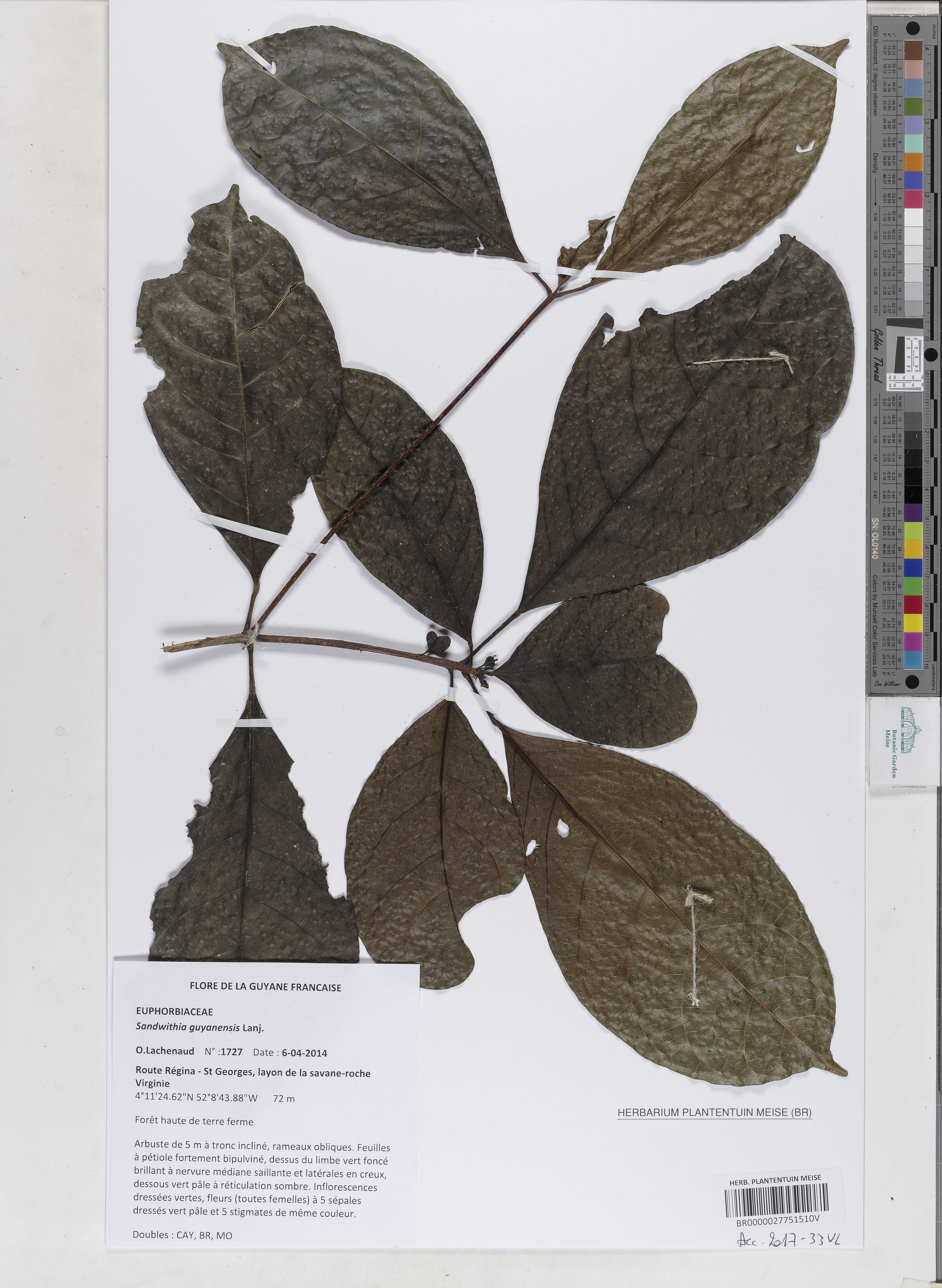

Scientific classification
- Kingdom: Plantae
- Clade: Tracheophytes
- Clade: Angiosperms
- Clade: Eudicots
- Clade: Rosids
- Order: Malpighiales
- Family: Euphorbiaceae
- Subfamily: Crotonoideae
- Tribe: Aleuritideae
- Subtribe: Grosserinae
- Genus: Sandwithia; Lanj.

= Sandwithia =

Genus of flowering plants

Sandwithia is a plant genus of the family Euphorbiaceae first described in 1932. It is native to northern South America. It is dioecious. The genus is named in honour of the botanist Noel Yvri Sandwith.

Species

1. Sandwithia guyanensis Lanj. - French Guiana, Guyana, Venezuela, N Brazil
2. Sandwithia heterocalyx Secco - SE Colombia, S Venezuela, N Brazil
