= Klaineanthus =

Scientific classification
- Kingdom: Plantae
- Clade: Tracheophytes
- Clade: Angiosperms
- Clade: Eudicots
- Clade: Rosids
- Order: Malpighiales
- Family: Euphorbiaceae
- Subfamily: Crotonoideae
- Tribe: Adenoclineae
- Subtribe: Adenoclininae
- Genus: Klaineanthus; Pierre ex Prain 1912
- Species: K. gaboniae

Binomial name
- Klaineanthus gaboniae Pierre ex Prain 1912

Synonyms
- Klaineanthus Pierre 1900 not validly published, not Pierre ex Prain 1912; Klaineanthus gabonii Pierre 1900 not validly published, not Klaineanthus gaboniae Pierre ex Prain 1912, spelling variation

Genus of flowering plants

Klaineanthus is a genus of plants, under the family Euphorbiaceae. There is only one known species, Klaineanthus gaboniae, native to central Africa (Nigeria, Cameroon, Gabon, Zaire, São Tomé and Príncipe).
