= Tapoides =

Conservation status
- Vulnerable (IUCN 3.1)

Scientific classification
- Kingdom: Plantae
- Clade: Tracheophytes
- Clade: Angiosperms
- Clade: Eudicots
- Clade: Rosids
- Order: Malpighiales
- Family: Euphorbiaceae
- Subfamily: Crotonoideae
- Tribe: Aleuritideae
- Subtribe: Grosserinae
- Genus: Tapoides; Airy Shaw
- Species: T. villamilii

Binomial name
- Tapoides villamilii (Merr.) Airy Shaw

Synonyms
- Ostodes villamilii Merr.

Genus of plants

Tapoides is a monotypic plant genus in the family Euphorbiaceae. The sole species is Tapoides villamilii. It is endemic to Borneo. It is dioecious, with male and female flowers on separate plants.
