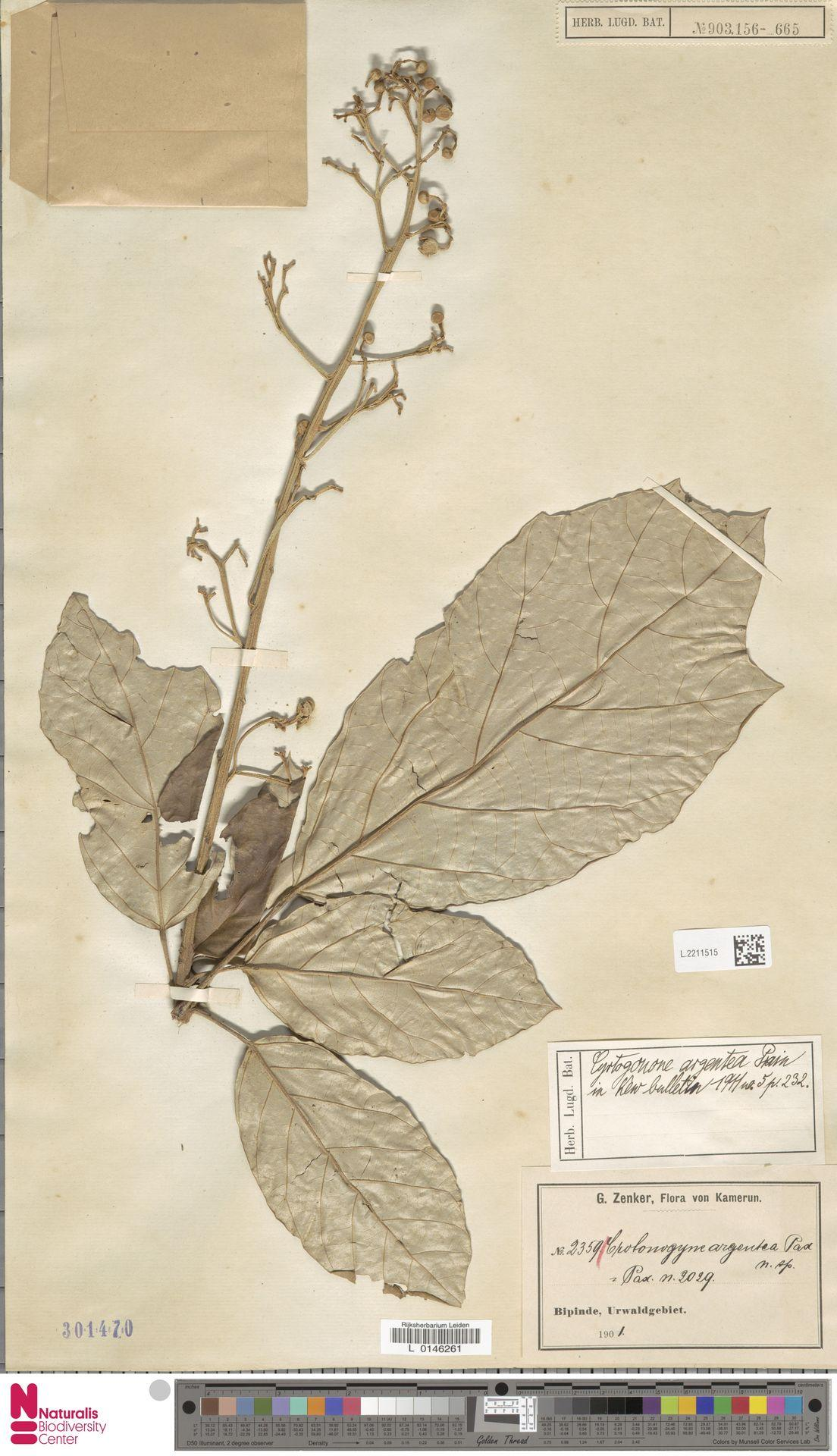
- Cyrtogonone argentea specimen at Naturalis Biodiversity Center, Netherlands

Scientific classification
- Kingdom: Plantae
- Clade: Tracheophytes
- Clade: Angiosperms
- Clade: Eudicots
- Clade: Rosids
- Order: Malpighiales
- Family: Euphorbiaceae
- Subfamily: Crotonoideae
- Tribe: Aleuritideae
- Subtribe: Crotonogyninae
- Genus: Cyrtogonone; Prain
- Species: C. argentea

Binomial name
- Cyrtogonone argentea (Pax) Prain

Synonyms
- Crotonogyne argentea Pax

= Cyrtogonone =

Genus of flowering plants

Cyrtogonone is a genus of shrubs or trees of the spurge family (Euphorbiaceae), first described as a genus in 1911. It contains only one known species, Cyrtogonone argentea, native to tropical central Africa (Nigeria, Cameroon, Gabon, Equatorial Guinea). It is dioecious.
