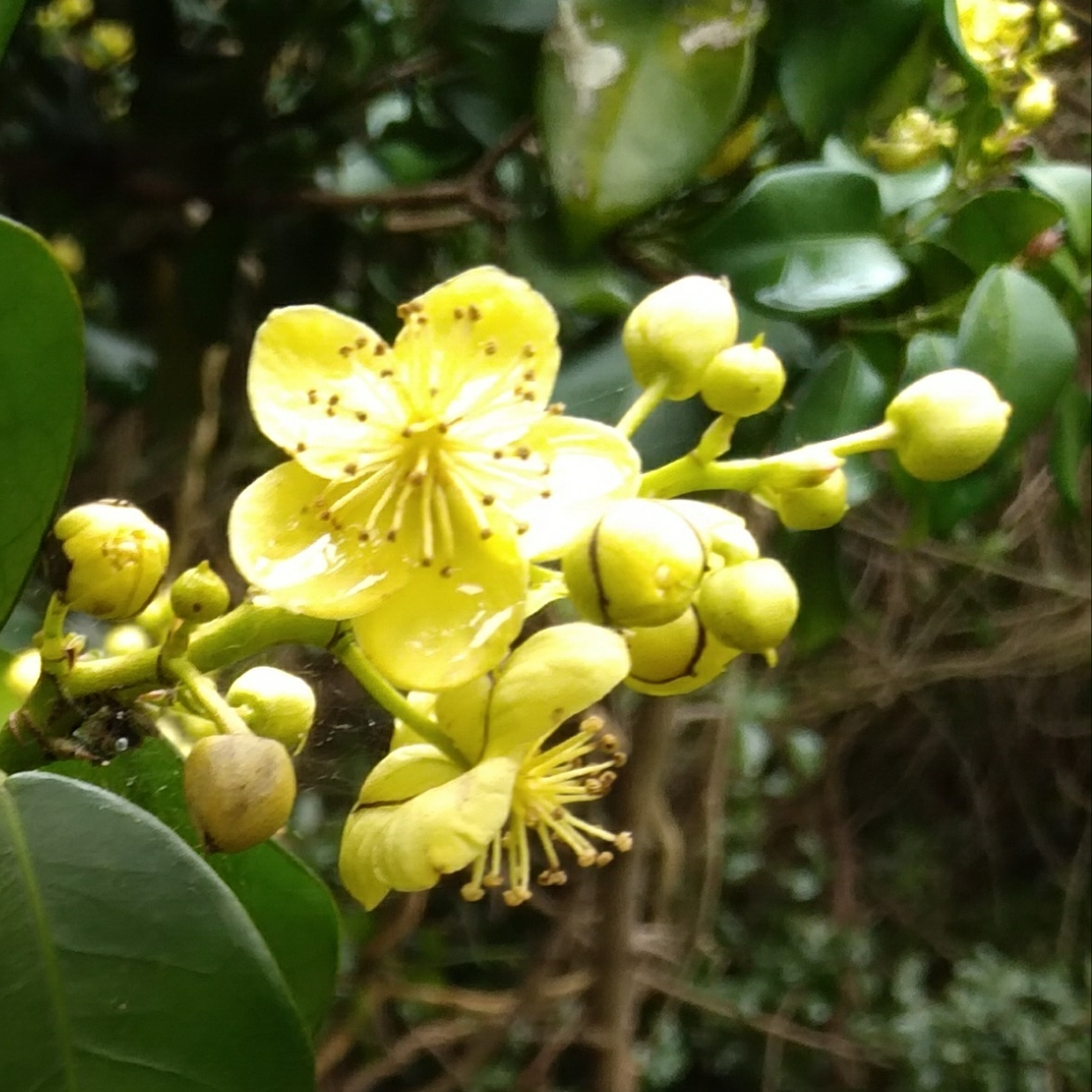
- Cavacoa aurea

Scientific classification
- Kingdom: Plantae
- Clade: Tracheophytes
- Clade: Angiosperms
- Clade: Eudicots
- Clade: Rosids
- Order: Malpighiales
- Family: Euphorbiaceae
- Subfamily: Crotonoideae
- Tribe: Aleuritideae
- Subtribe: Grosserinae
- Genus: Cavacoa; J.Léonard

= Cavacoa =

Genus of flowering plants

Cavacoa is a plant genus of the family Euphorbiaceae first described as a genus in 1955. All the species are native to sub-Saharan Africa. It is dioecious.

Species

1. Cavacoa aurea (Cavaco) J.Léonard - Kenya, Malawi, Mozambique, KwaZulu-Natal
2. Cavacoa baldwinii (Keay & Cavaco) J.Léonard - Sierra Leone, Liberia
3. Cavacoa quintasii (Pax & K.Hoffm.) J.Léonard - Annobón, São Tomé, Zaïre
