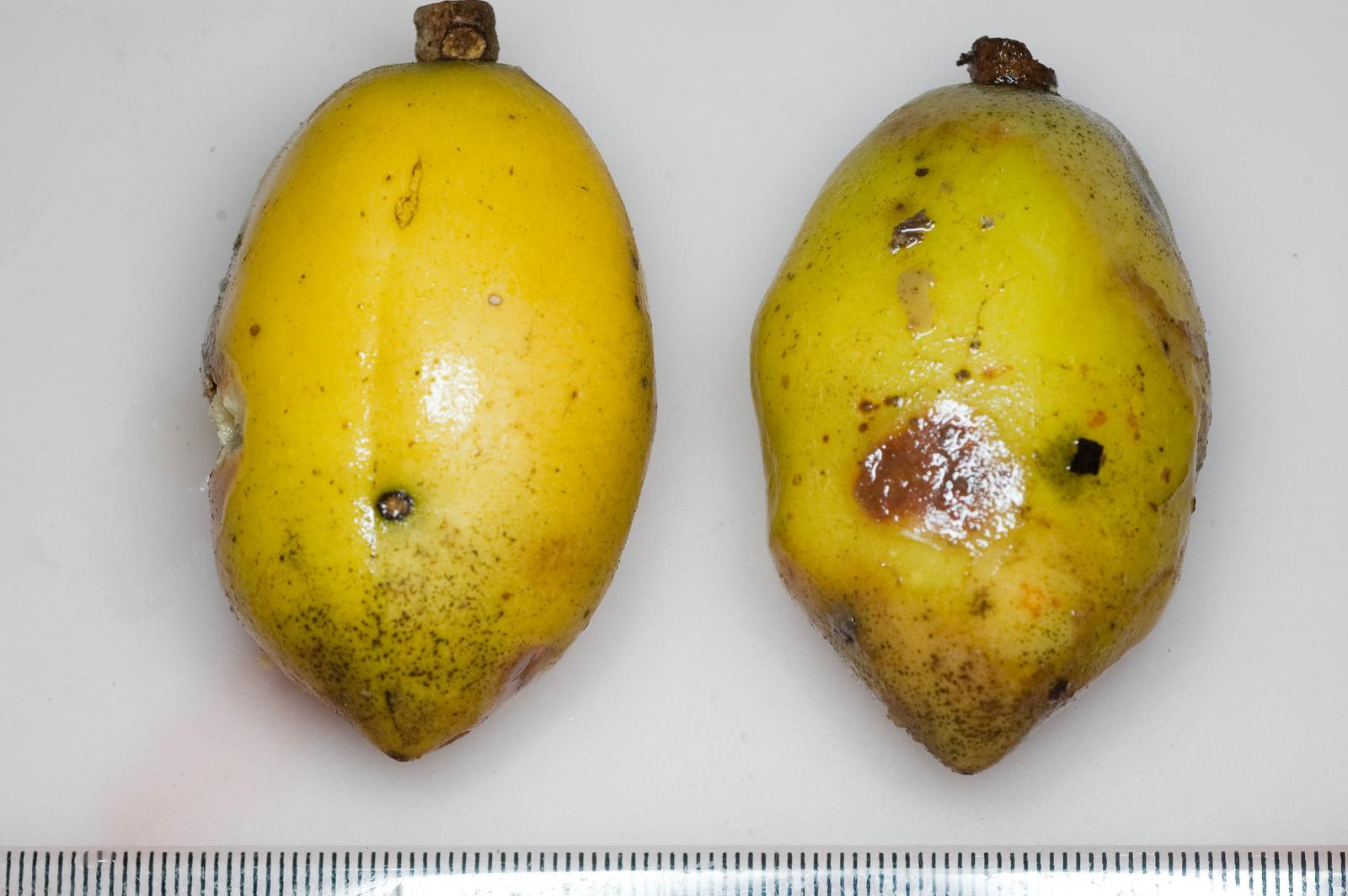
- Fruits of Glycydendron sp.

Scientific classification
- Kingdom: Plantae
- Clade: Tracheophytes
- Clade: Angiosperms
- Clade: Eudicots
- Clade: Rosids
- Order: Malpighiales
- Family: Euphorbiaceae
- Subfamily: Crotonoideae
- Tribe: Adenoclineae; G.L.Webster

Genera
- Subtribe Adenoclininae: Adenocline; Ditta; Glycydendron; Klaineanthus; Tetrorchidium; Subtribe Endosperminae: Endospermum

= Adenoclineae =

Tribe of flowering plants

Adenoclineae is a tribe of the subfamily Crotonoideae, under the family Euphorbiaceae. It comprises 2 subtribes and 6 genera.

The tribe has been described for over 100 years, since at least 1913.

This clade evolved possibly in India during the Cretaceous.

== See also ==
- Taxonomy of the Euphorbiaceae
