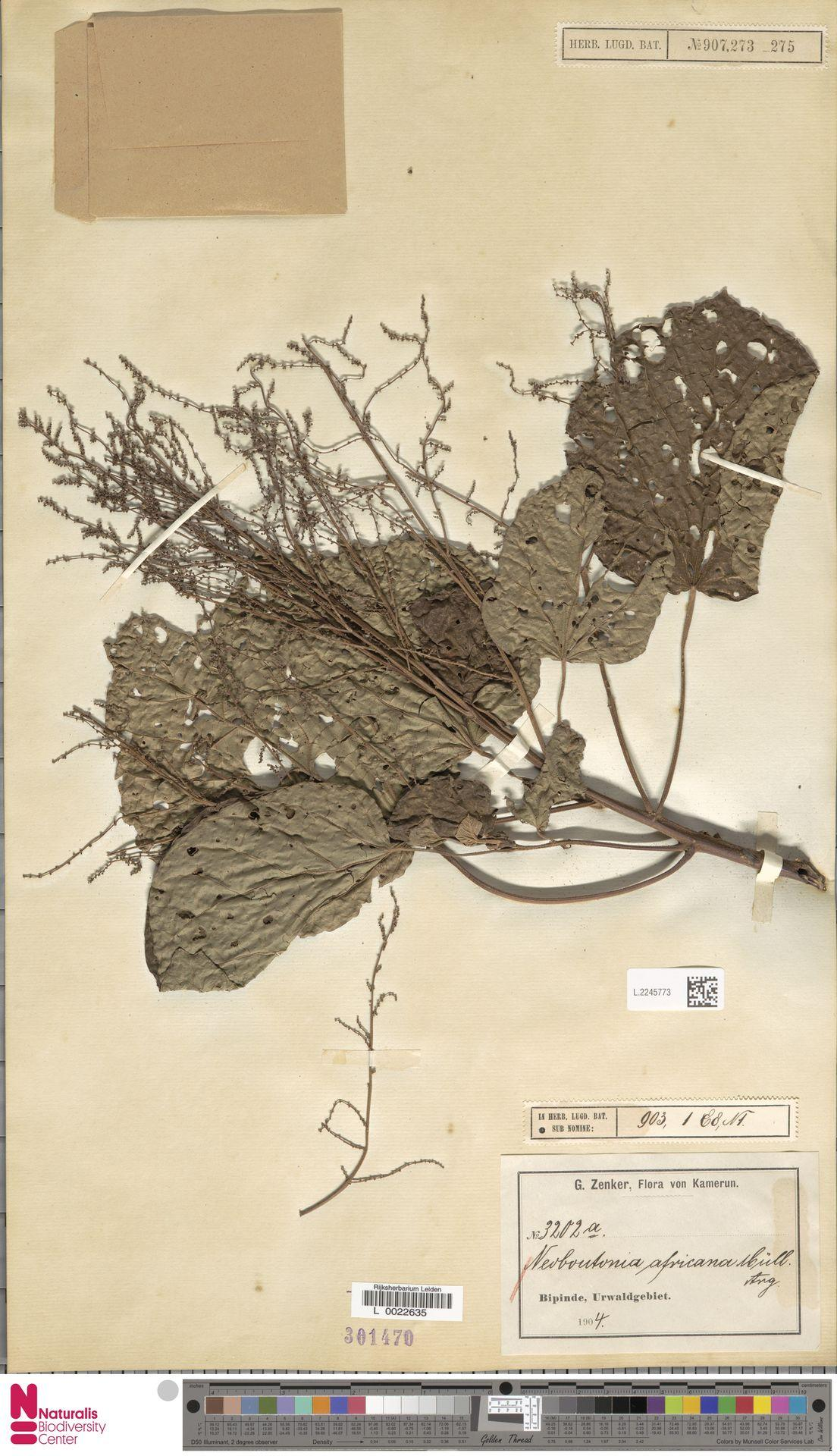
- Specimen from Naturalis Biodiversity Center, Netherlands

Conservation status
- Near Threatened (IUCN 2.3)

Scientific classification
- Kingdom: Plantae
- Clade: Tracheophytes
- Clade: Angiosperms
- Clade: Eudicots
- Clade: Rosids
- Order: Malpighiales
- Family: Euphorbiaceae
- Genus: Neoboutonia
- Species: N. mannii

Binomial name
- Neoboutonia mannii Benth.

= Neoboutonia mannii =

Species of flowering plant

Neoboutonia mannii is a species of plant in the family Euphorbiaceae. It is found in Cameroon, Equatorial Guinea, and Nigeria. It is threatened by habitat loss.
