= Suregada lithoxyla =

Conservation status
- Near Threatened (IUCN 3.1)

Scientific classification
- Kingdom: Plantae
- Clade: Tracheophytes
- Clade: Angiosperms
- Clade: Eudicots
- Clade: Rosids
- Order: Malpighiales
- Family: Euphorbiaceae
- Genus: Suregada
- Species: S. lithoxyla

Binomial name
- Suregada lithoxyla (Pax & K.Hoffm.) Croizat

Synonyms
- Gelonium lithoxylon Pax & K.Hoffm.

Species of flowering plant

Suregada lithoxyla is a species of plant in the family Euphorbiaceae. It is endemic to Tanzania.
