= Endospermum medullosum =

- Herbarium specimen at Kew

Conservation status
- Vulnerable (IUCN 3.1)

Scientific classification
- Kingdom: Plantae
- Clade: Embryophytes
- Clade: Tracheophytes
- Clade: Spermatophytes
- Clade: Angiosperms
- Clade: Eudicots
- Clade: Rosids
- Order: Malpighiales
- Family: Euphorbiaceae
- Genus: Endospermum
- Species: E. medullosum

Binomial name
- Endospermum medullosum L.S.Sm.

Species of flowering plant

Endospermum medullosum, commonly known as whitewood or PNG basswood, is a species of flowering plant in the family Euphorbiaceae . It was first described in 1947 by Australian botanist Lindsay Stuart Smith, and is native to areas from eastern Indonesia to Vanuatu. It is used as a source of timber.

== Description ==
=== Trunk and foliage ===
Endospermum medullosum is a tree that will typically grow to 20–40 m (66–131 ft) tall, but is capable of reaching over 50 m (160 ft). The trunk may reach 1.2 m (4 ft) diameter, and butresses may be present, which can grow to be 4 m (13 ft) tall and 2 m (6 ft 7 in) wide. Stipules are present and may be 10 mm (0.4 in) long and 3 mm (0.12 in) wide. The leaves are held on a petiole up to 14 cm (6 in) long; the leaf blade is ovate to elliptic with a base that is usually cordate or sometimes peltate. They are somewhat stiff, and are hairy on both sides (much more so underneath). They can be up to 28 cm (11 in) long and 18 cm (7 in) wide.

=== Flowers ===
The inflorescence type is a panicle up to 19 cm (7.5 in) long, arising in the leaf axils. This species is dioecious, meaning that male and female flowers are borne on separate plants, but it may rarely produce bisexual flowers. All flowers lack petals and are pale green or yellow. The male flowers generally have 5 to 8 stamens; female flowers lack a style, the ovary has a single locule (i.e. the chamber within the ovary that contains the ovules).

=== Fruit ===
The fruits of this species are berry-like capsules, ovoid, and pale green or yellow. They contain a single brownish-black seed that is approximately 5 mm (0.2 in) long. The fruits are eaten by monkeys, pigeons and cassowaries.

== Distribution and habitat ==
Endospermum medullosum grows naturally in the Maluku Islands of eastern Indonesia, through New Guinea, the Bismarck Archipelago, the Solomon and Santa Cruz Islands to Vanuatu in the western South Pacific. It grows in humid lowland tropical climates where the temperature averages 22–28 °C (72–82 °F), with a mean rainfall of 1,500–5,600 millimetres (60–220 in) annually, and at altitudes from sea level to about 1,100 m (3,600 ft).

The species can grow in a variety of soil types and terrains, from steep slopes to alluvial flats and seasonal swamps.

== Cultivation ==
Endospermum medullosum can be propagated from seeds as well as vegetative cuttings. With seed propagation, seeds should be collected quickly when they mature and planted within a few days. The seeds should be collected when the fruits go from dark green to light green. Usually 9,000 to 9,600 fruits produce 30,000 to 35,000 seeds. The species has low seed viability; therefore it is beneficial to raise the plant from cuttings. These cuttings are usually taken from hedges in misty conditions.

For the first couple of years and it is important the species has enough space to grow to maintain this growth rate. Under optimal conditions the fruits of the plant appear in the first 3–4 years. Endospermum medullosum has limited tolerance to various environmental conditions. These conditions include drought, shade, high wind speeds, and salt spray. Since the species did not evolve in these environments, growth under these conditions will be limited. The tree can grow fairly quickly in locations that are sunny.

== Uses ==
Whitewood has been used traditionally to make canoes and for firewood. The timber has a medium density and is easily worked. It has numerous applications in furniture and joinery but is not suitable for ground-contact situations. The timber is exported from Papua New Guinea. The leaves are used as a vegetable and the bark and sap have uses in traditional medicine.

=== In agroforestry ===
Due to its extensive root system, Endospermum medullosum can be used to prevent soil erosion. It also has potential uses as a wind break and for shading crops that cannot take full sun.
