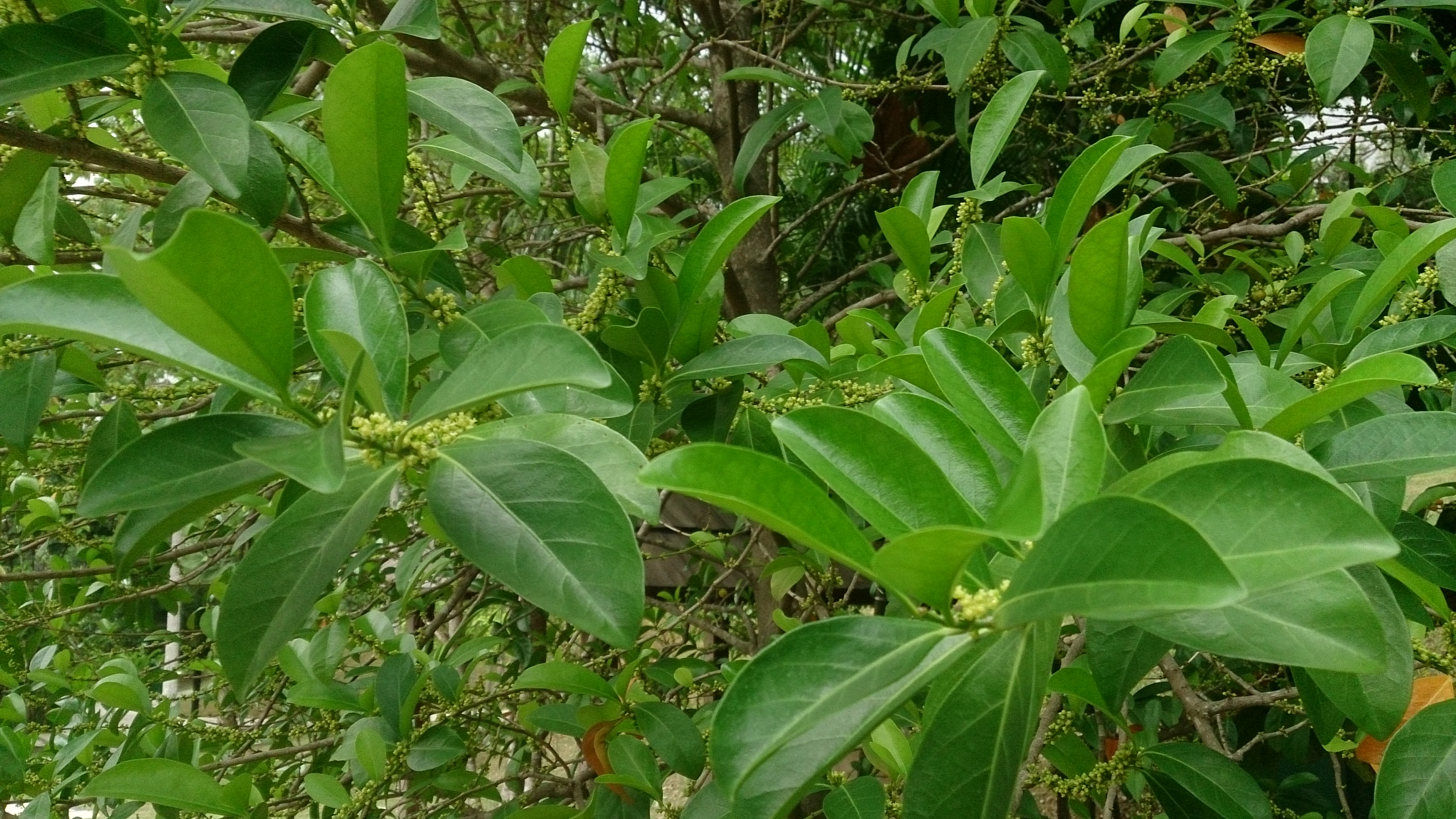
- Branch of Suregada multiflora

Scientific classification
- Kingdom: Plantae
- Clade: Tracheophytes
- Clade: Angiosperms
- Clade: Eudicots
- Clade: Rosids
- Order: Malpighiales
- Family: Euphorbiaceae
- Genus: Suregada
- Species: S. multiflora

Binomial name
- Suregada multiflora (A.Juss.) Baill.

Synonyms
- Suregada tenuifolia (Ridl.) Croizat; Suregada sumatrana (S.Moore) Croizat; Suregada oxyphylla (Miq.) Kuntze; Suregada multiflora var. verrucigera Suregada multiflora var. lamellata Suregada glabra Roxb. Suregada dicocca Roxb. ex Pax; Suregada bifaria (Roxb. ex Willd.) Baill. Suregada affinis (S.Moore) Croizat; Gelonium tenuifolium Ridl. Gelonium sumatranum S.Moore; Gelonium oxyphyllum Miq. Gelonium obtusum Miq. Gelonium multiflorum A.Juss. Gelonium fascuculatum Roxb. Gelonium bifarium Roxb. ex Willd. Gelonium affine S.Moore

= Suregada multiflora =

Species of tree

Suregada multiflora, sometimes called the "false lime tree", is a species in the family Euphorbiaceae. The Catalogue of Life lists no subspecies. It is found in tropical Asia: names include kén or mân mây in Viet Nam.

== Gallery ==
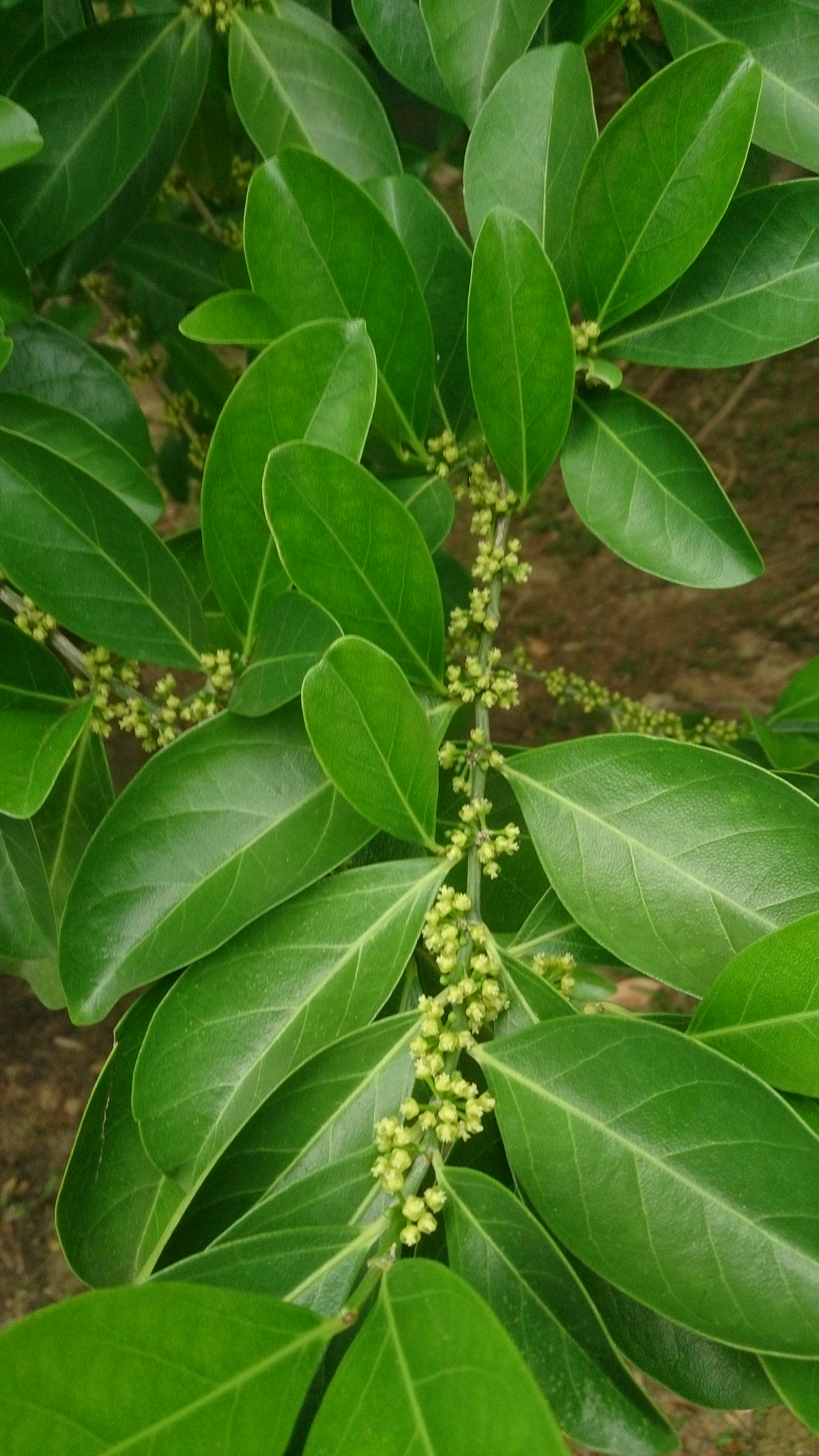

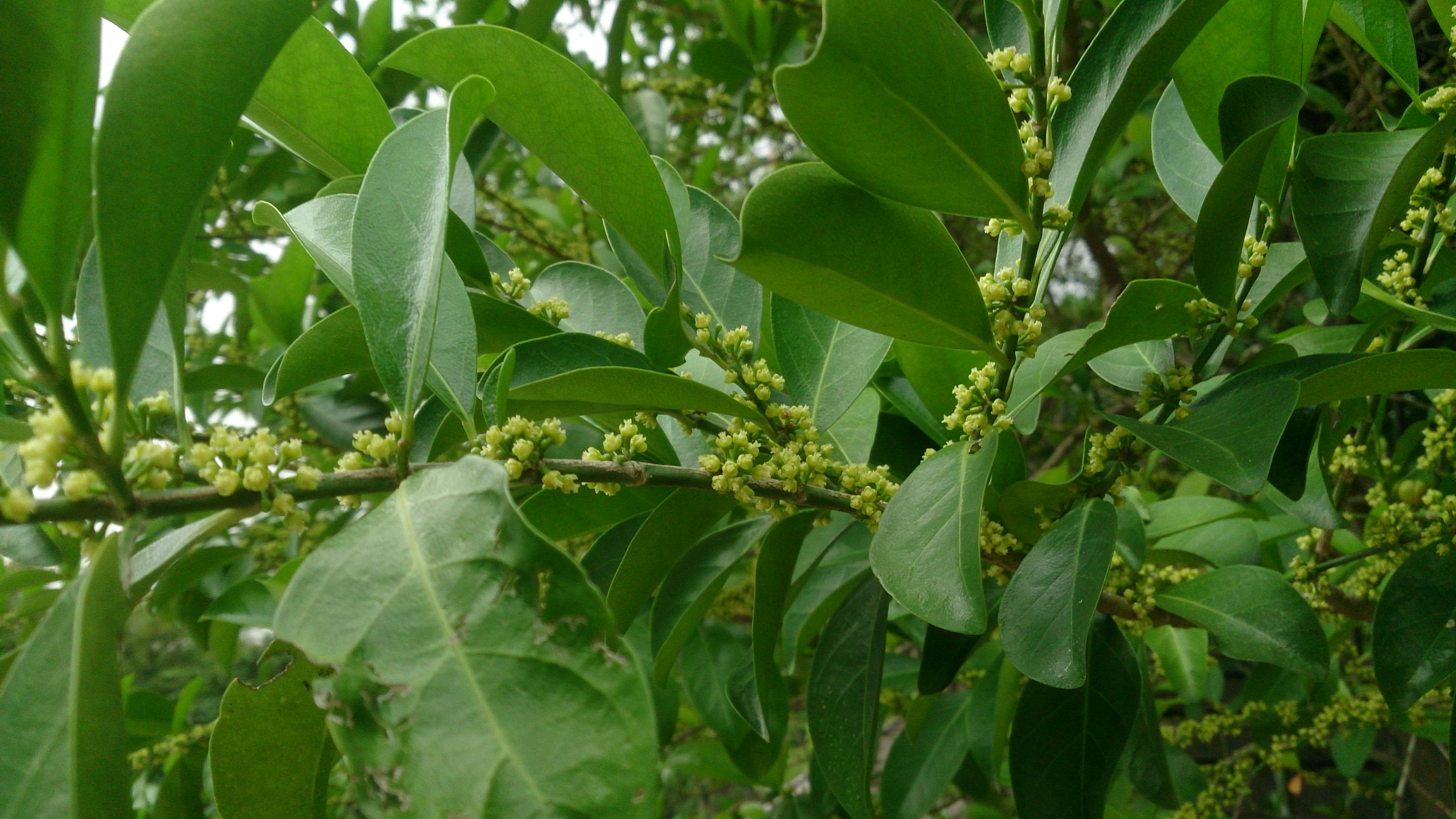

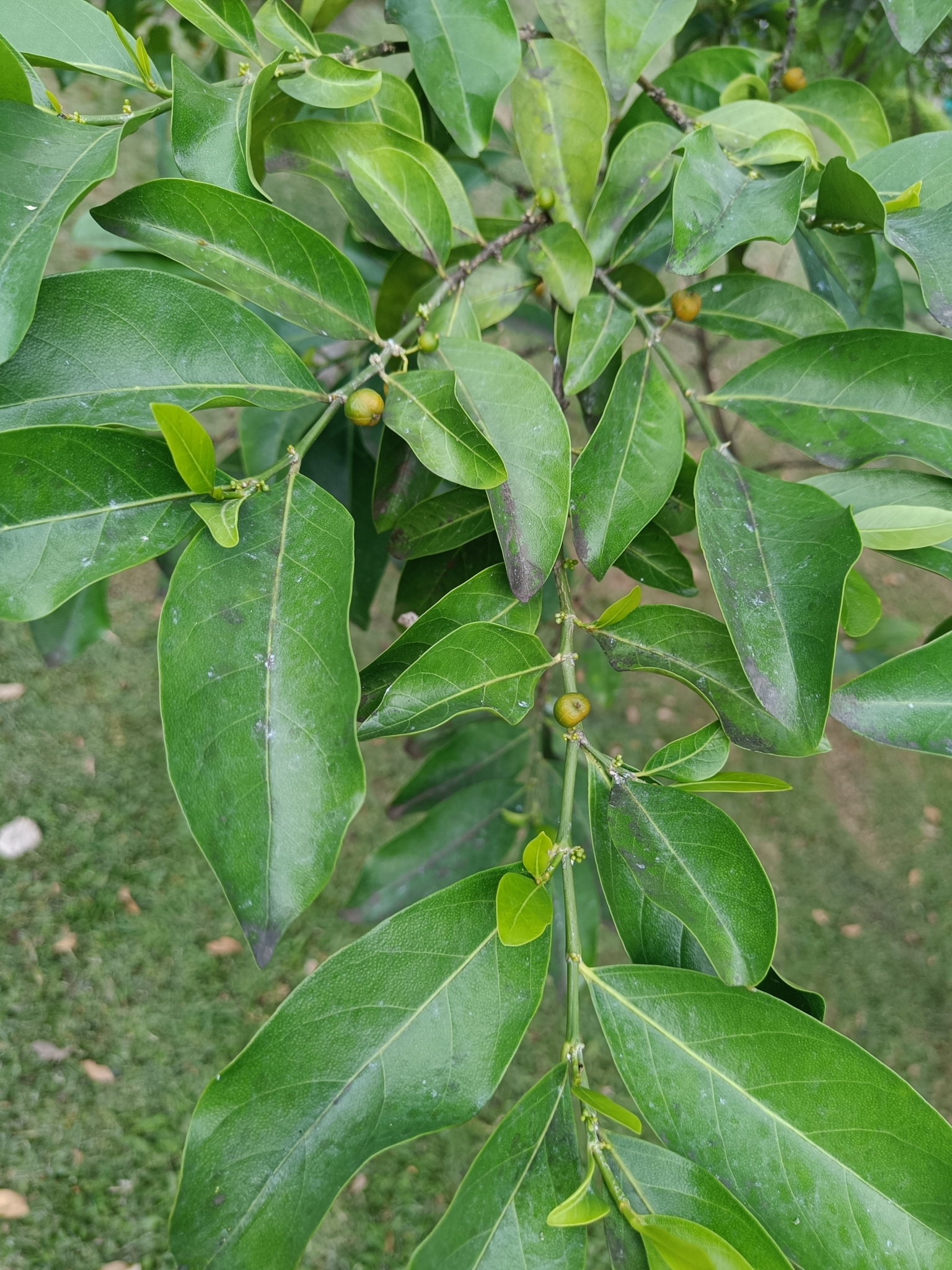

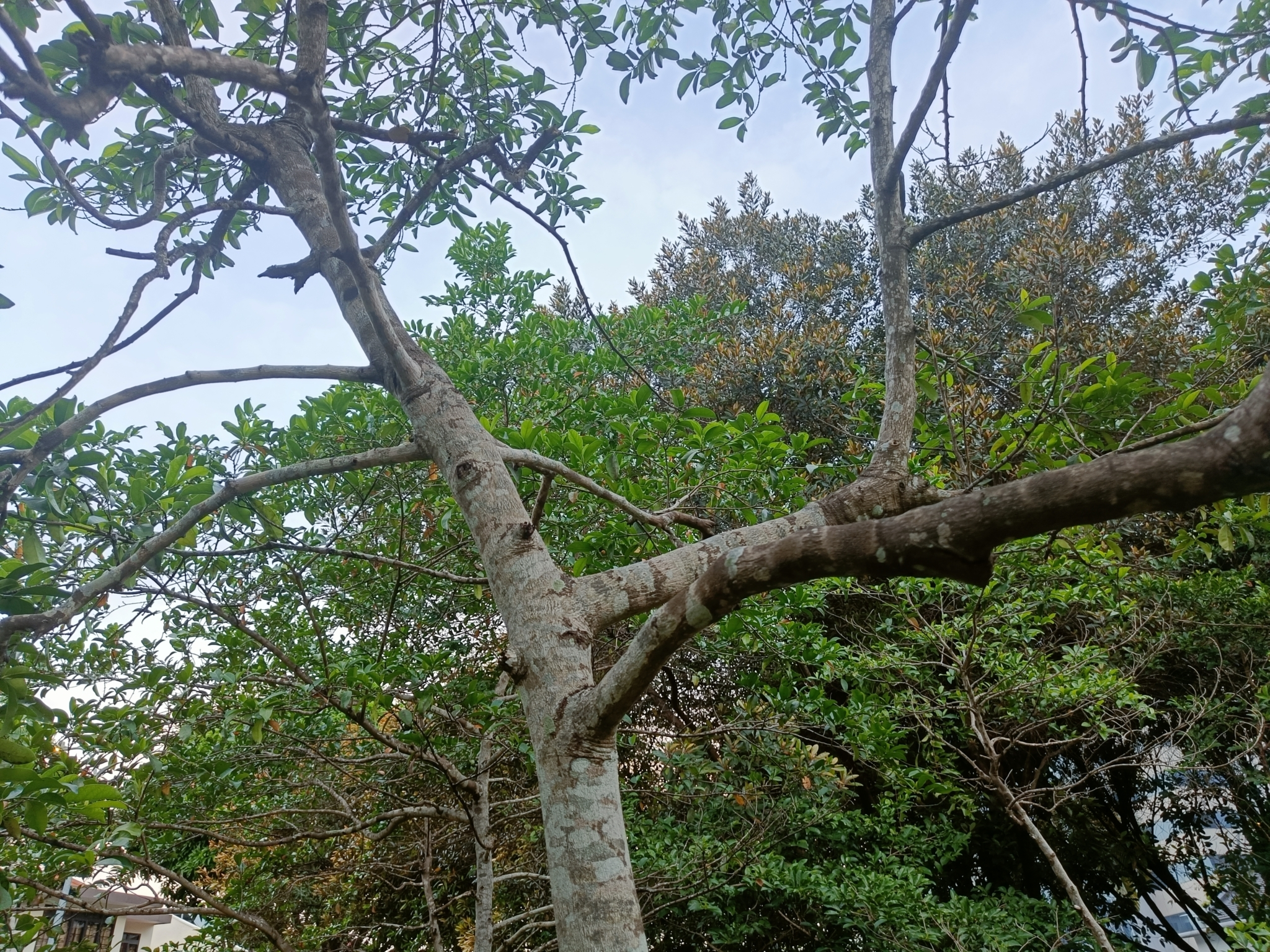
