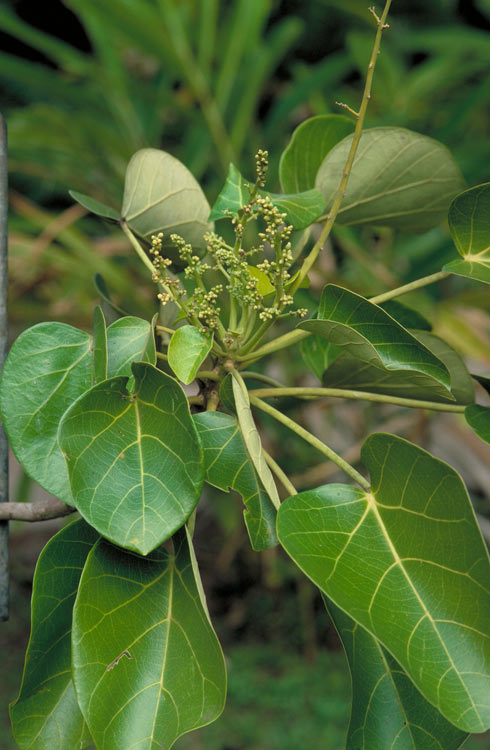
- Foliage and flowers

Conservation status
- Least Concern (IUCN 3.1)

Scientific classification
- Kingdom: Plantae
- Clade: Embryophytes
- Clade: Tracheophytes
- Clade: Spermatophytes
- Clade: Angiosperms
- Clade: Eudicots
- Clade: Rosids
- Order: Malpighiales
- Family: Euphorbiaceae
- Genus: Endospermum
- Species: E. myrmecophilum

Binomial name
- Endospermum myrmecophilum L.S.Sm.
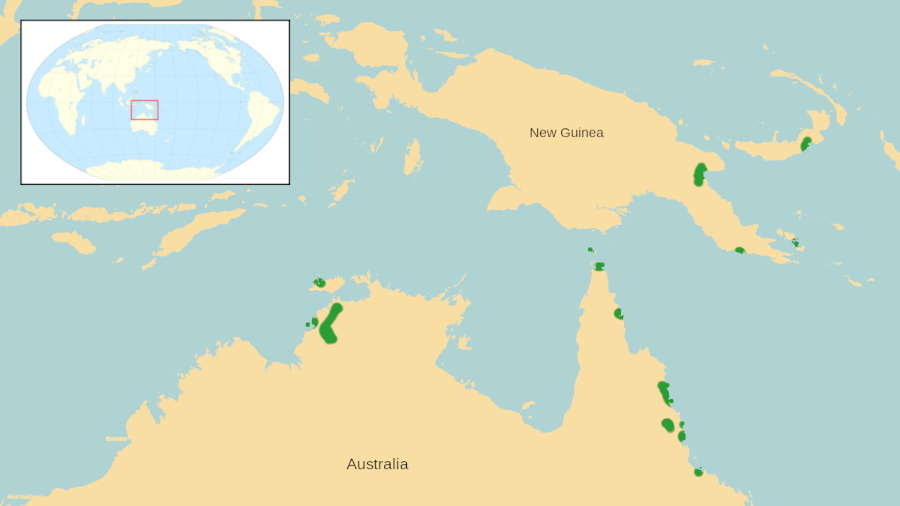

= Endospermum myrmecophilum =

Species of flowering plant

Endospermum myrmecophilum, commonly known as moon tree or toywood, is a species of plant in the family Euphorbiaceae. It is native to New Guinea and to the Northern Territory and Queensland, Australia. It was first described in 1947 by Lindsay Stuart Smith and it has a conservation status of least concern.

== Description ==
Endospermum myrmecophilum is a tree that usually grows to about 30 m (100 ft) tall with a trunk up to 90 cm (35 in) diameter. The bark is pale with longitudinal fissures, and the tree may have buttresses up to 1 m (40 in) tall. The branches are hollow and inhabited by ants. Stipules are present, measuring up to 3.5 mm (0.14 in) long. The leaves are attached to the branches by a petiole (leaf stalk) up to 28 cm (11 in) long, and the leaf blades are ovate to orbicular and about 30 cm (12 in) wide and long. There are two conspicuous glands on the underside of the leaf blade next to the junction with the petiole. The leaves are glossy green above and covered with minute hairs underneath.

The inflorescence consists of a number of short spikes forming a panicle. This species is dioecious, meaning that male and female flowers are borne on separate plants. Flowers of both sexes are small, about 3 mm (0.12 in) diameter and hairy. Male flowers usually have five stamens; female flowers have a single locule or chamber within the ovary. The fruit is a somewhat globose green drupe about 8 mm (0.3 in) long and 6 mm (0.2 in) wide containing one seed.

== Taxonomy ==
This species was first described in 1946 by Australian botanist Lindsay Stuart Smith, in a paper that dealt with the genus Endospermum in New Guinea. It was published in 1947 in the journal Proceedings of the Royal Society of Queensland.

=== Etymology ===
The generic name Endospermum is from the Greek endon 'within', combined with sperma 'seed'. It is a reference to the seeds being kept within the indehiscent fruit.

== Distribution and habitat ==
In Australia, this species is found in the northwest of the Northern Territory, and from Mission Beach to the top of Cape York Peninsula in Queensland. In New Guinea it occurs mostly in the eastern parts of Papua New Guinea. It grows in and on the margins of rainforest, in swamps and alluvial forest, and has a preference for sandy loams. It is found from sea level up to 150 m (490 ft) in Australia and up to 460 m (1,510 ft) in New Guinea.

== Conservation ==
In 2019, this species was assessed by the International Union for Conservation of Nature (IUCN) and found to be to be of least concern. The Queensland Government, under its Nature Conservation Act, has given it the same rating. The IUCN supports its assessment by saying that no threats to this species have been identified, and the species has an extent of occurrence of more than 2,500,000 km^{2} (970,000 sq mi).
