= Grossera elongata =

Conservation status
- Vulnerable (IUCN 2.3)

Scientific classification
- Kingdom: Plantae
- Clade: Tracheophytes
- Clade: Angiosperms
- Clade: Eudicots
- Clade: Rosids
- Order: Malpighiales
- Family: Euphorbiaceae
- Genus: Grossera
- Species: G. elongata

Binomial name
- Grossera elongata Hutch.

Species of flowering plant

Grossera elongata is a species of plant in the family Euphorbiaceae. It is endemic to Príncipe.
