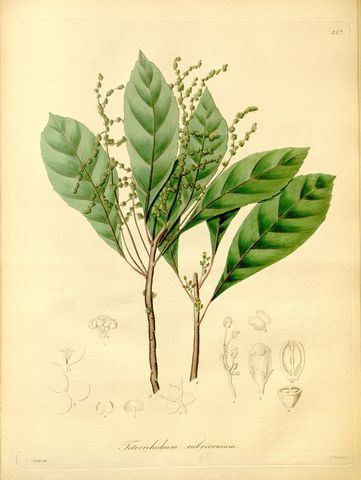
- Tetrorchidium rubrivenium

Scientific classification
- Kingdom: Plantae
- Clade: Tracheophytes
- Clade: Angiosperms
- Clade: Eudicots
- Clade: Rosids
- Order: Malpighiales
- Family: Euphorbiaceae
- Subfamily: Crotonoideae
- Tribe: Adenoclineae
- Subtribe: Adenoclininae
- Genus: Tetrorchidium; Poepp.

Synonyms
- Hasskarlia Baill.; Tetrorchidiopsis Rauschert

= Tetrorchidium =

Genus of flowering plants

Tetrorchidium is a genus of flowering plants in the family Euphorbiaceae first described in 1841. It is native to tropical portions of Africa and the Western Hemisphere.

Species

1. Tetrorchidium andinum Müll.Arg. - Costa Rica, Honduras, Colombia, Ecuador, Peru, Ecuador
2. Tetrorchidium brevifolium Standl. & Steyerm. - S Mexico, Guatemala, Honduras
3. Tetrorchidium bulbipilosum Cuatrec. - Colombia, Ecuador
4. Tetrorchidium congolense J.Léonard - Gabon, Congo, Zaire
5. Tetrorchidium costaricense Huft - Costa Rica, Panama
6. Tetrorchidium didymostemon (Baill.) Pax & K.Hoffm. - tropical Africa
7. Tetrorchidium duckei Radcl.-Sm. & Govaerts - B Amazonas
8. Tetrorchidium dusenii Pax & K.Hoffm. - Paraná in Brazil
9. Tetrorchidium euryphyllum Standl. - Costa Rica, Panama, Colombia, Ecuador
10. Tetrorchidium gabonense Breteler - Gabon
11. Tetrorchidium hirsutum J.Murillo & K.Wurdack - Ecuador
12. Tetrorchidium jamaicense Croizat - Jamaica
13. Tetrorchidium macrophyllum Müll.Arg. - - Costa Rica, Venezuela, Colombia, Ecuador, Peru, Bolivia
14. Tetrorchidium microphyllum Huft - Panama
15. Tetrorchidium ochroleucum Cuatrec. - Colombia, Ecuador
16. Tetrorchidium oppositifolium (Pax) Pax Gabon, Cameroon, Nigeria, Ivory Coast, Ghana, Liberia
17. Tetrorchidium parvulum Müll.Arg. - SE Brazil
18. Tetrorchidium popayanense Croizat - Colombia, Ecuador
19. Tetrorchidium robledoanum Cuatrec. - Colombia, Ecuador, Panama
20. Tetrorchidium rotundatum Standl. - Central America, C + S Mexico
21. Tetrorchidium rubrivenium Poepp. - Costa Rica + Windward Islands south to N Argentina
22. Tetrorchidium trichotocarpum McPherson - Panama
23. Tetrorchidium ulugurense Verdc. - Morogoro Region in Tanzania
