= Garcia nutans =

Conservation status
- Least Concern (IUCN 3.1)

Scientific classification
- Kingdom: Plantae
- Clade: Tracheophytes
- Clade: Angiosperms
- Clade: Eudicots
- Clade: Rosids
- Order: Malpighiales
- Family: Euphorbiaceae
- Genus: Garcia
- Species: G. nutans

Binomial name
- Garcia nutans Vahl ex Rohr

Synonyms
- Garcia mayana Britton

Species of flowering plant

Garcia nutans is a species of flowering plant in the family Euphorbiaceae. It is a shrub or tree widespread across Mexico from Sinaloa and San Luis Potosí to Chiapas + Yucatán, as well as being native to Central America, Colombia, and Venezuela.
