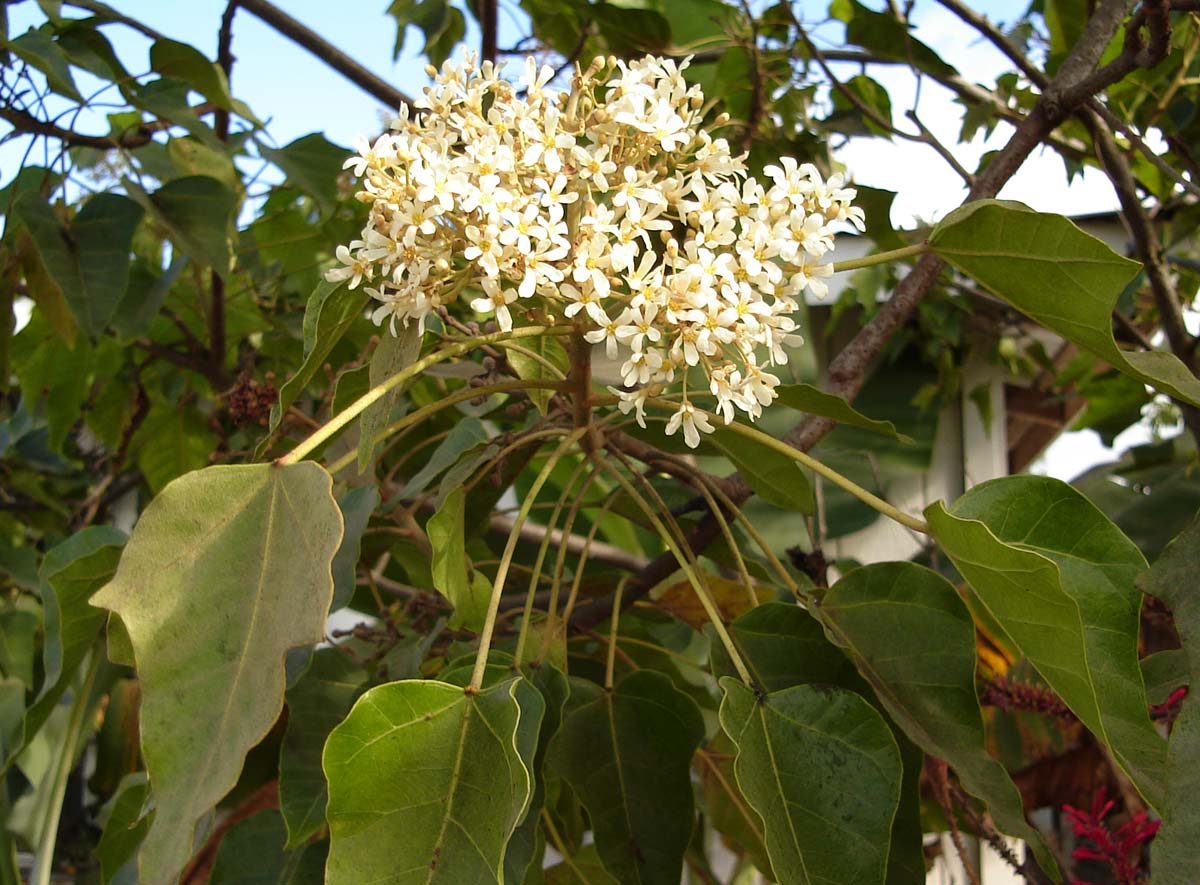
- Aleurites moluccanus

Scientific classification
- Kingdom: Plantae
- Clade: Tracheophytes
- Clade: Angiosperms
- Clade: Eudicots
- Clade: Rosids
- Order: Malpighiales
- Family: Euphorbiaceae
- Subfamily: Crotonoideae
- Tribe: Aleuritideae; Hurus.

Subtribes
- Aleuritinae; Benoistiinae; Crotonogyninae; Garciinae; Grosserinae; Neoboutoniinae

= Aleuritideae =

Tribe of flowering plants

Aleuritideae is a tribe of the subfamily Crotonoideae, under the family Euphorbiaceae.

== Genera ==
It comprises 6 subtribes and 14 genera:

=== Aleuritinae ===
1. Aleurites J.R.Forst. & G.Forst.
2. Reutealis Airy Shaw
3. Vernicia Lour.

Monogeneric subtribe Benoistiinae

- Benoistia H.Perrier & Leandri

=== Crotonogyninae ===
1. Crotonogyne Müll.Arg.
2. Cyrtogonone
3. Manniophyton Müll.Arg.

Monogeneric subtribe Garciinae

- Garcia Rohr

=== Grosserinae ===
1. Cavacoa
2. Grossera Pax
3. Sandwithia
4. Tannodia Baill.
5. Tapoides Airy Shaw

Monogeneric subtribe Neoboutoniinae

- Neoboutonia Airy Shaw

== See also ==
- Taxonomy of the Euphorbiaceae
