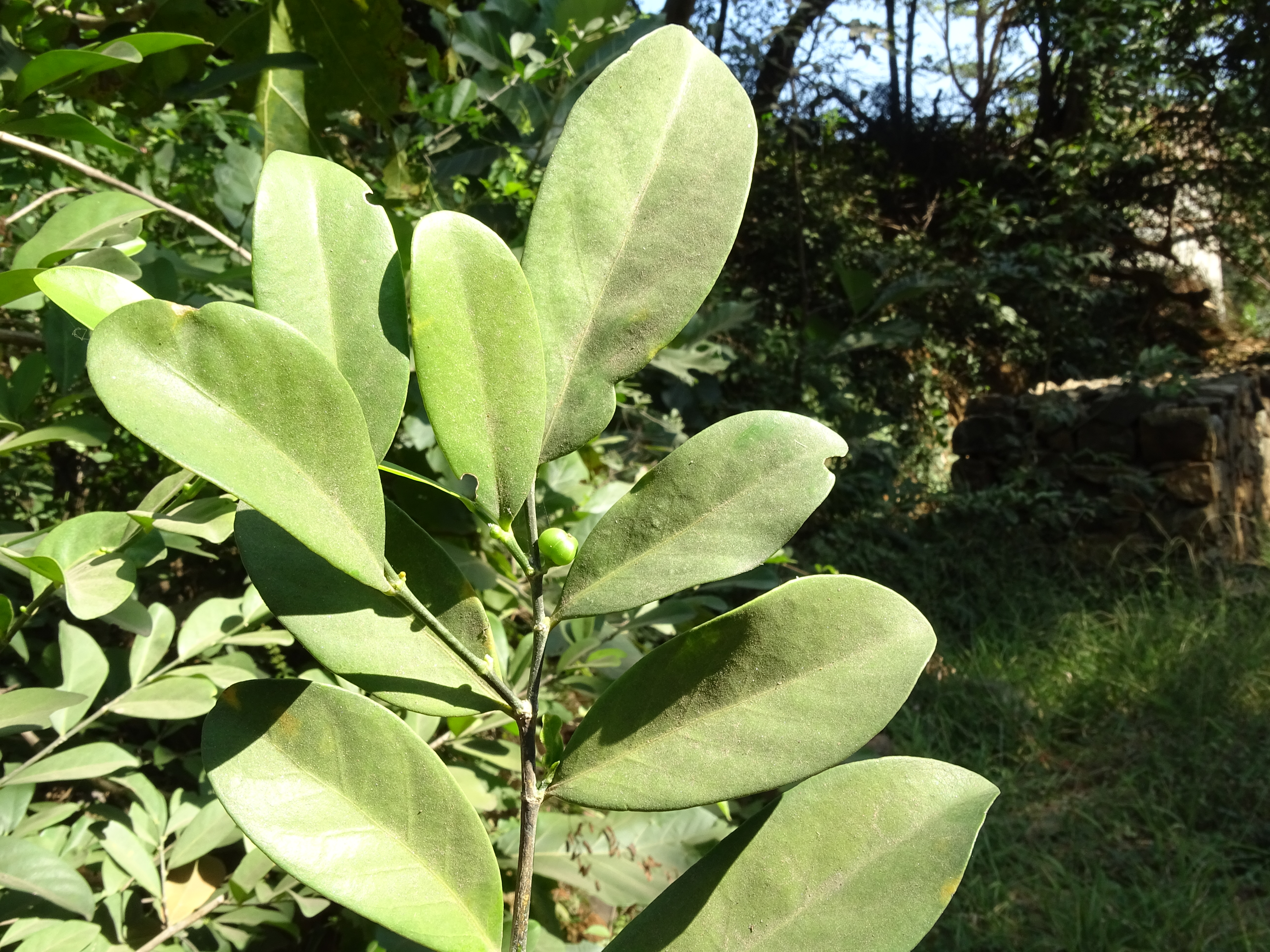
- In Kerala, India

Scientific classification
- Kingdom: Plantae
- Clade: Tracheophytes
- Clade: Angiosperms
- Clade: Eudicots
- Clade: Rosids
- Order: Malpighiales
- Family: Euphorbiaceae
- Genus: Suregada
- Species: S. lanceolata

Binomial name
- Suregada lanceolata (Willd.) Kuntze

Synonyms
- Gelonium angustifolium Müll.Arg.; Gelonium lanceolatum Willd.; Suregada angustifolia (Müll.Arg.) Airy Shaw; Suregada angustifolia Baill. [Illegitimate]

= Suregada lanceolata =

Species of flowering plant

Suregada lanceolata is a species of plant in the family Euphorbiaceae. It is native to India and Sri Lanka.

== Description ==
- Leaves - alternate or oblanceolate; apex acuminate; margin entire.
- Flowers - unisexual. male flowers are peduncled cymes, female flowers are solitary and axillary.
- Fruits - three-seeded and three-lobed globose capsule.
