= Tetrorchidium brevifolium =

Conservation status
- Least Concern (IUCN 3.1)

Scientific classification
- Kingdom: Plantae
- Clade: Tracheophytes
- Clade: Angiosperms
- Clade: Eudicots
- Clade: Rosids
- Order: Malpighiales
- Family: Euphorbiaceae
- Genus: Tetrorchidium
- Species: T. brevifolium

Binomial name
- Tetrorchidium brevifolium Standl. & Stayerm.

Species of orchid

Tetrorchidium brevifolium is a species of plant in the family Euphorbiaceae. It is found in Guatemala and Honduras.
