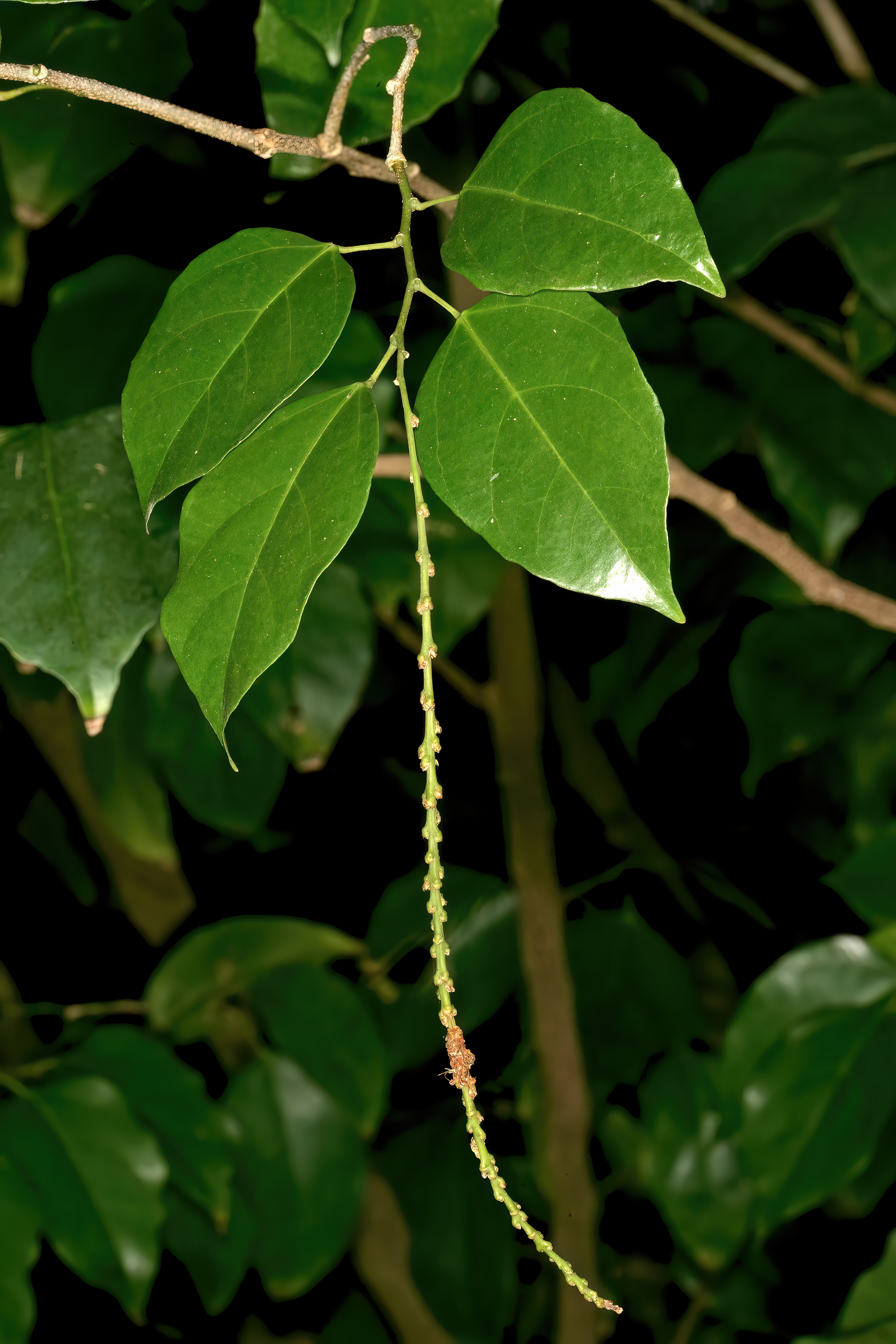
- At Lowveld National Botanical Garden, South Africa

Conservation status
- Vulnerable (IUCN 3.1)

Scientific classification
- Kingdom: Plantae
- Clade: Tracheophytes
- Clade: Angiosperms
- Clade: Eudicots
- Clade: Rosids
- Order: Malpighiales
- Family: Euphorbiaceae
- Genus: Tannodia
- Species: T. swynnertonii

Binomial name
- Tannodia swynnertonii (S.Moore) Prain

= Tannodia swynnertonii =

Species of flowering plant

Tannodia swynnertonii is a species of plant in the family Euphorbiaceae. It is found in Mozambique, Tanzania, and Zimbabwe.
