= Tetrorchidium microphyllum =

Conservation status
- Critically Endangered (IUCN 2.3)

Scientific classification
- Kingdom: Plantae
- Clade: Tracheophytes
- Clade: Angiosperms
- Clade: Eudicots
- Clade: Rosids
- Order: Malpighiales
- Family: Euphorbiaceae
- Genus: Tetrorchidium
- Species: T. microphyllum

Binomial name
- Tetrorchidium microphyllum Huft

Species of orchid

Tetrorchidium microphyllum is a species of plant in the family Euphorbiaceae. It is endemic to Panama. It is threatened by habitat loss.
