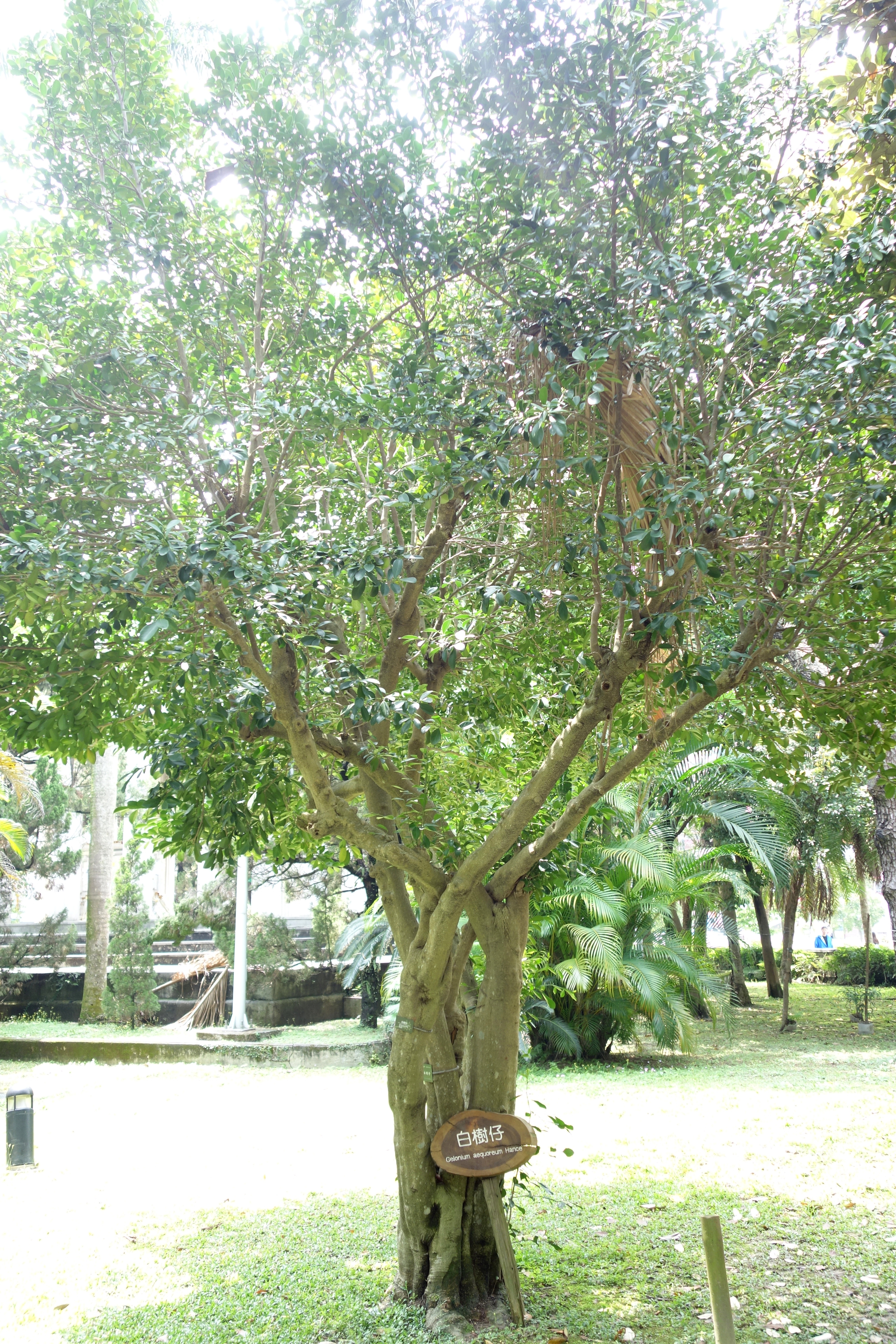

Scientific classification
- Kingdom: Plantae
- Clade: Tracheophytes
- Clade: Angiosperms
- Clade: Eudicots
- Clade: Rosids
- Order: Malpighiales
- Family: Euphorbiaceae
- Genus: Suregada
- Species: S. aequorea

Binomial name
- Suregada aequorea (Hance) Seem.

Synonyms
- Gelonium aequoreum Hance; Owataria formosana Matsum.

= Suregada aequorea =

Species of shrub

Suregada aequorea is a plant species of the family Euphorbiaceae. It is native to southern Taiwan and the northern Philippines. It is a shrubs or small tree, growing to about 3 meters in height. Its leaves are elliptic to obovate-oblong, 3.5-9 × 2–3.5 cm in size. In Taiwan it grows in coastal thickets.
