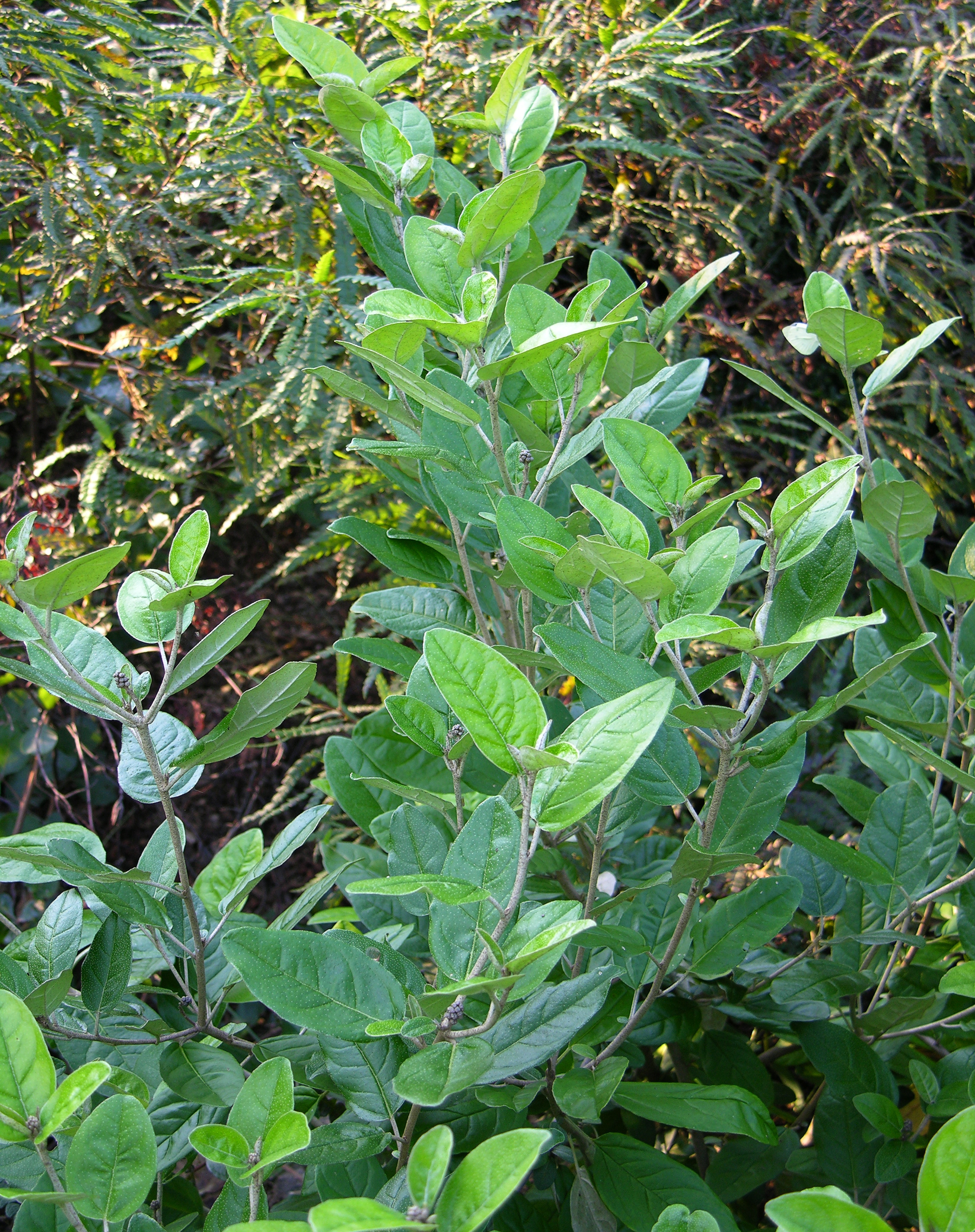
- Croton alabamensis

Scientific classification
- Kingdom: Plantae
- Clade: Tracheophytes
- Clade: Angiosperms
- Clade: Eudicots
- Clade: Rosids
- Order: Malpighiales
- Family: Euphorbiaceae
- Subfamily: Crotonoideae; Burmeist.

Tribes
- Adenoclineae; Aleuritideae; Codiaeae; Crotoneae; Elateriospermeae; Gelonieae; Jatropheae; Manihoteae; Micrandreae; Ricinocarpeae; Ricinodendreae; Trigonostemoneae

= Crotonoideae =

Subfamily of flowering plants

The Crotonoideae (crotonoids) is a subfamily within the family Euphorbiaceae. This subfamily contains many plants with purgative properties, such as Croton tiglium and Jatropha curcas.

== See also ==
- Taxonomy of the Euphorbiaceae
