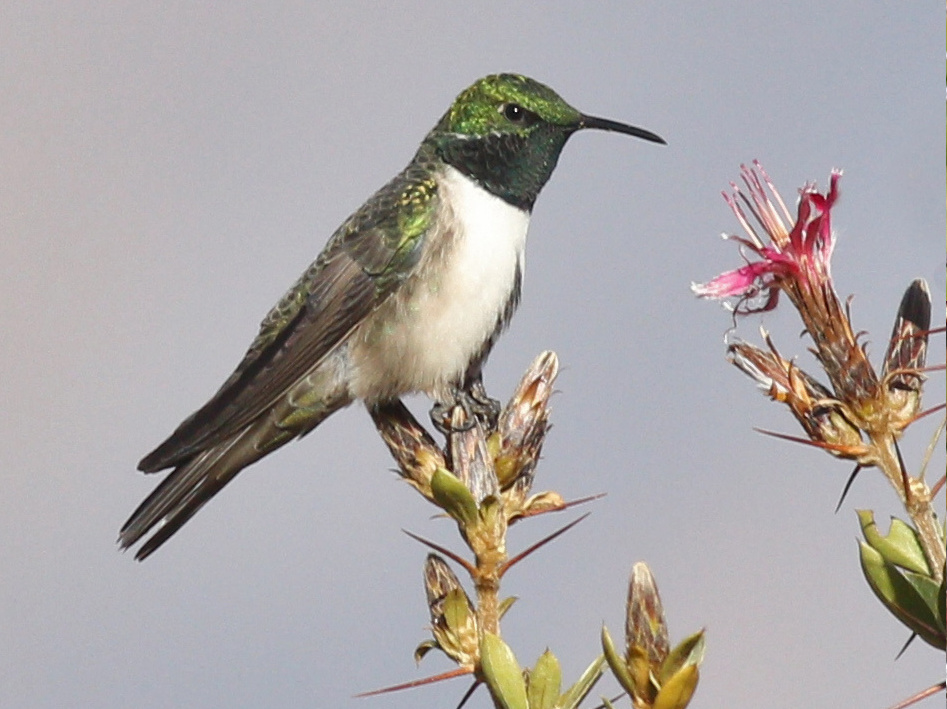
- Male

Conservation status
- Least Concern (IUCN 3.1)
- CITES Appendix II

Scientific classification
- Kingdom: Animalia
- Phylum: Chordata
- Class: Aves
- Order: Apodiformes
- Family: Trochilidae
- Genus: Oreotrochilus
- Species: O. stolzmanni

Binomial name
- Oreotrochilus stolzmanni Salvin, 1895

Synonyms
- Oreotrochilus estella stolzmanni

= Green-headed hillstar =

Species of bird

The green-headed hillstar (Oreotrochilus stolzmanni) is a species of hummingbird found in the Andes of southern Ecuador and northern and central Peru. It is one of 7 species in the genus Oreotrochilus, and can be distinguished from its relatives by subtle differences in plumage coloration. The green-headed hillstar received its name due to its bronze and green crown and gorget of bright emerald green plumage. The species was first discovered by English ornithologist Osbert Salvin in 1895 and named after Polish ornithologist Jean Stanislaus Stolzmann.

Hillstars of this genus are distinct among the hummingbird family Trochilidae because of their preference for high-elevation environments, and the development of many behavioral and physiological adaptations in order to survive the cold climate of the high Andes.

== Description ==
The green-headed hillstar is a species of South American hummingbird ranging in length from 12 to 13 cm and weighing between 7.9 and 8.4 g.

The green-headed hillstar is a sexually dimorphic species. The males are more brightly colored than females. Males have a bronzed-green posterior, including the forehead, crown, back, sides and rump. Their wings are a dark contrast to their back. The primaries and secondaries are typically a dark black/brown and green. Their tail's central rectrices are a soft bronze and their wide, blunt ended outer rectrices are nearly white. On their anterior, they have a metallic emerald green gorget that may appear bronze or blue in certain angles. Their underparts are white with a black streak down the center. At certain angles, the gorget of the adult male will have a slight blue gleam. The females share a similar physique to males, primarily differing in gorget and tail feathers. Their gorgets are white with dotted lines of green to grey spots. Females also have darker tails than males. Their tails are green and black with white webbing along the base of the outer rectrices. The wings of adult males are larger than those of adult females by approximately 3.5mm. This is a common trait for species in the hillstar genus, excluding the wedge-tailed hillstar. Juveniles resemble adult females.

There is no significant difference in measurements to the Andean hillstar, Ecuadorian hillstar, black-breasted hillstar or blue-throated hillstar. It is believed this is due to the commonality of a high altitude, cold Andean climate with similar diets, which has stabilized measurements specifically of the size of the bill, wing and rectrices.

== Taxonomy ==
Hummingbirds (Trochilidae) such as the green-headed hillstar are considered members of the Apodiformes bird order, along with swifts (Apodidae) and treeswifts (Hemiprocnidae). Within the hummingbird family, Hillstars (Oreotrochilus) are a genus of hummingbirds that inhabit the alpine and temperate Andes in South America between the altitudes of 1,200 and 5,200 m (3,900 and 17,100 ft).

First described in 1895, the green-headed hillstar has traditionally been considered a subspecies of the Andean hillstar (Oreotrochilus estella), but is now increasingly treated as a separate species based on differences in genetics and plumage. Compared to the Andean hillstar, the male green-headed hillstar has a brighter green crown and a black (not brown) line to the central underparts. The two species were also split due to the green-headed hillstar having a stronger mitochondrial DNA relationship to the black-breasted hillstar than the Andean hillstar. Females of these are very similar, but the males are easily separated.

The green-headed hillstar was officially elevated to species status by the Handbook of the Birds of the World and BirdLife Taxonomic Checklist version 4 in December 2019 and the International Ornithological Committee's World Bird Names version 10.2 in 2020.

After the recent discovery of a new hillstar species (Oreotrochilus cyanolaemus), studies think the green-headed hillstar is a sister species to O. cyanolaemus. This supports the green-headed hillstar's differentiation from the Andean hillstar.

The binomial name commemorates Polish ornithologist Jan Sztolcman (Jean Stanislaus Stolzmann).

There are currently seven species in the genus Oreotrochilus.

- Green-headed hillstar (Oreotrochilus stolzmanni)
- Andean hillstar (Oreotrochilus estella)
- Ecuadorian hillstar (Oreotrochilus chimborazo)
- Black-breasted hillstar (Oreotrochilus melanogaster)
- Wedge-tailed hillstar (Oreotrochilus adela)
- White-sided hillstar (Oreotrochilus leucopleurus)
- Blue-throated hillstar (Oreotrochilus cyanolaemus)

This species radiation is hypothesized to be a result of allopatric speciation.

== Habitat and distribution ==
The green-headed hillstar is distributed across north and central Peru, and extends up to the southernmost portion of the Ecuadorian Andes. Its habitat includes rocky alpine grasslands, meadows, and scrublands populated by Puya and Polylepsis stands.

They are found at altitudes of 3,600 to 4,200 meters (11,800 to 13,800 ft) and are known to seasonally shift to lower elevations.

The species is often spotted either perched on rocks or Puya clusters or occasionally on the ground in clearings. Females are more commonly found in gorges and valleys with more densely packed flora as these are some of the best nesting areas for high rates of clutch survival. Males also inhabit these gorges and valleys, but frequently occupy the rocky, more barren areas as well.

Jimbura is the only region in Ecuador acknowledged to have an occurrence of the species. It is a location that produces the Chuquiraga plant, one of a few food sources for the species.

== Behaviour ==
The green-headed hillstar is usually sighted alone or in pairs, except during night-time, when groups gather in crevices and caves along the mountainside to roost. It is thought that this roosting behaviour exists to combat very cold nights at such a high altitude and as a way to evade nocturnal predators.

Similar to other hummingbird species, the green-headed hillstar has one of the highest mass-specific metabolic rates of all homeothermic animals, and therefore must consume a large quantity of sugar everyday in order to sustain this high metabolism. To reduce the metabolic cost of energy during the night when they are not feeding, hummingbirds are one of the few bird species that enter a state of torpor, or deep sleep, to reduce their metabolic rate to 1/15 of its normal rate. Hillstar species, like the green-headed hillstar, have further developed these behavioural adaptations in order to live in the especially cold climate of the Andes. For example, on cold nights the green-headed hillstar enters a state of torpor and will sleep in sheltered places like cavities in rocks or caves, and often sleep nestled close together with several other hillstars in order to reduce heat loss from their bodies. Additionally, while hummingbirds are distinct for their ability to hover by producing power on both the forward and back wing beat, in order to save energy the green-headed hillstar rarely hovers and instead clings to flowers to feed on their nectar, as well as only flying short distances. These behaviors can help minimize the energy required to maintain their body temperature and metabolism, and reduce energy expenditure which helps them thrive in the cold, harsh climate of the Andes.

=== Vocalization ===
The vocalizations of the green-headed hillstar are similar to that of the Andean hillstar. They produce a brief and continuous 'tsip' or 'tseep' sound. The other recognisable vocalization of the green-headed hillstar is the melodic twittering and note fluctuation that occurs mostly during displays and chases with other members of their species. Chase calls are demonstrated by both sexes.

Members of the blue-throated hillstar species have been observed repeatedly responding to the vocalizations of the green-headed hillstar and further research concluded that there is no outward difference between the calls of the two species'.

The vocalization of the green-headed hillstar is high in pitch, as hummingbirds communicate and hear in the range between 2 and 5 kilohertz (kHz). Hillstars on average produce higher frequency vocalizations, believed to be a result of high-altitude habitats and eliminating acoustic competition. They produce their highest frequency vocalizations when they are perched on the stems of Chuquiraga plants. The green-headed hillstar is estimated to have a frequency range of 9.9–10.7 kHz. The duration of the calls is broadly estimated to last 60-122 milliseconds.

It is unknown whether the green-headed hillstar shares vocalization frequencies with the Ecuadorian hillstar. The Ecuadorian hillstar regularly vocalizes at above 7 kHz and is also able to vocalize in the ultrasonic range at approximately 28 kHz.

The green-headed hillstar vocalizes above the environmental frequency grasslands it inhabits, which is between 2–5 kHz. Therefore, the species has little to no competition acoustically.

=== Diet ===
Like other hummingbirds, the green-headed hillstar is a specialized nectarivore, and feeds preferably on the nectar and pollen of Puya, Cacti, Chuquiraga, and Cajophora/Caiophora. They are also known to occasionally feed on flying insects mid-air using a hawking technique.

They tend to perch on flowers within 3 feet of the ground, and will occasionally come and rest on the ground.

Males are highly territorial of feeding grounds.

The green-headed hillstar is one of few hillstars that appears to have a mutualistic relationship with the Chuqiraga plant genus. an estimate of 91% of its range overlaps with that of the Chugiraga. This plant genus is reliant on northern hillstars for pollination.

Like most hummingbirds, the green-headed hillstar uses its long and protractible tongue to collect small amounts of nectar from flowers. Its long and thin bill is a morphological characteristic correlated with a diet of nectar and pollen.

=== Reproduction ===
The green-headed hillstar will begin breeding during its second year of life, with the breeding season usually starting in February and ending in June, though sometimes continuing into August. A cup-shaped nest is built out of plant fibers and moss in protective places like rock cavities, under overhangs, in roofs or houses, or inside old open buildings like barns. The female lays a clutch of two white eggs, and incubates them for 19 to 21 days. When the eggs hatch, the chicks are generally dark with two dorsal rows of grey natal down or plumulaceous feathers. Fledglings of these young birds occurs approximately 36 to 40 after hatching. Courtship in the green-headed hillstar is not well studied, but evidence suggests males display using various postures to enhance their iridescent green gorget, and this is display is accompanied by melodious twittering.

== Conservation and potential threats ==
According to the IUCN Red List of Threatened Species, the green-headed hillstar is ranked as least concern due to it being locally common in its extensive geographic range throughout the Peruvian Andes. The green-headed hillstar also has a relative extent of occurrence greater than 20,000 km^{2} and therefore is not classified as 'Vulnerable' or 'Near Threatened'. It is believed the species' extent of occurrence is actually closer to 108,000 km^{2}.

While their population has not been thoroughly quantified, evidence suggests that the total number of mature individuals is greater than 10,000 and their population trends are stable, which provides further evidence of the green-headed hillstar's Red List status of least concern.

In 2019, 35% of the green-heeded hillstar's Peru range overlapped with mineral mining concessions.

Due to the rocky and arid nature of their habitat, agriculture does not pose a threat to their habitat at this point in time.
