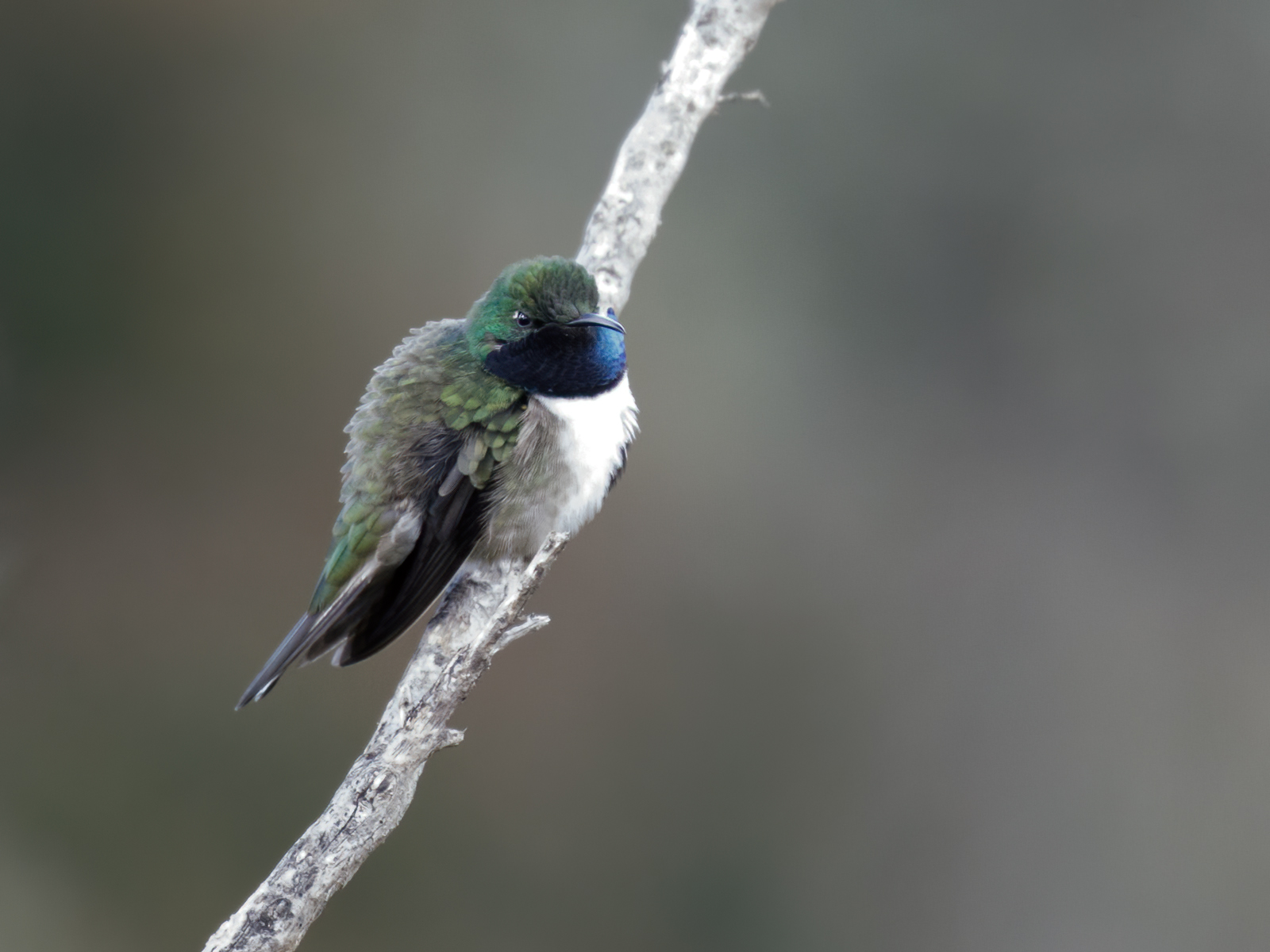

Conservation status
- CITES Appendix II

Scientific classification
- Kingdom: Animalia
- Phylum: Chordata
- Class: Aves
- Clade: Strisores
- Order: Apodiformes
- Family: Trochilidae
- Genus: Oreotrochilus
- Species: O. cyanolaemus

Binomial name
- Oreotrochilus cyanolaemus Sornoza-Molina, Freile, Nilsson, Krabbe & Bonaccorso, 2018

= Blue-throated hillstar =

Species of bird

The blue-throated hillstar (Oreotrochilus cyanolaemus) is a hummingbird found only in a small portion of the southwestern Andes in Ecuador. It was discovered in 2017.

== Taxonomy and evolution ==
The species name "cyanolaemus" is based on the Latinized Greek words for ultramarine blue (kuanos) and throat (laimos). Based on a sequences of a single mitochondrial gene, ND2, the species was found to be closely related to a clade composed of the black-breasted hillstar (O. melanogaster) and the green-headed hillstar (O. stolzmanni).

== Description ==
The top of the head of the male blue-throated hillstar is iridescent emerald green, which extends from the forehead to the base of the crown. The iridescent highlights are blue-green. The nape of the neck, mantle, lower portion of the back, rump, and upperwing coverts are bright emerald green. Some feathers in these regions have blue-green edging, and some have bronze highlights. The uppertail coverts are emerald blue-green. The upper surface of the central flight feathers are blackish blue. The other flight feathers and the upperwing coverts are dull black to dusky greenish blue, with a blue sheen. The outermost primary feathers have a white edge. The feathers of the throat and chin are a glittering ultramarine blue, with white bases separated from the blue parts of the feather by a black line. The feathers of the throat have slightly green tips, and are longer on the sides of the throat than in the middle; the extent of these green tips varies between individuals. The bright blue throat patch was the basis for its name. The bird has a velvety black collar around its throat. The belly and the breast are a dull white color, and the feathers in these regions have black bases. There is a black longitudinal stripe in the middle of the belly. The sides and flanks of the bird are between green and greenish gray, with metallic green highlights. The undertail coverts are dull grayish-buff, while the lower surface of the tail is dull white. The flight feathers of the tail are blackish blue.

In the female of the species, the back is emerald green, with some variation between bluish and bronze-green. The uppertail coverts are brighter and more blue than in the male. The wing coverts are dusky bluish green, and the outer primaries have a white edge. The throat and chin are speckled; the feathers are black at the base, whitish in the middle, and grayish olive on the outer half, with a dark green spot. The sides of the throat are whiter than in the male. The extent of the dusky color in the throat varies between individuals. The flanks, belly, breast, and undertail coverts are grayish buff with occasional brighter olive green feathers, as are the ventral regions of the tail. The tail has white patches, the size and shape of which vary between individuals. The flight feathers of the tail are dusky bluish green.

In both sexes, the beak is black, with yellowish tomia. A holotype specimen weighed 8.15 g. Males of the species may be distinguished from congeners by the presence of the ultramarine throat, emerald green head and upperparts with bluish-green feather tips, and emerald green tips to the throat feathers. Females may be distinguished by the presence of a dusky-gray chin and upper throat in contrast to a whitish lower throat, and emerald green head and upperparts with bluish green feather tips on the head and a bluish green shine on the body. The males are most similar to those of the green-headed hillstar (O. stolzmanni) and the Ecuadorian hillstar (O. chimborazo); they are differentiated most clearly by the green throat patch in the green-headed hillstar, and the purple hood in the Ecuadorian hillstar. The vocalizations of the blue-throated hillstar are similar to those of its congeners; they are highly variable, and include rapid titters of rising and falling frequency, and single noted calls consisting of an "up–down stroke".

== Habitat and ecology ==
The preferred habitat of the blue-throated hillstar is grassland with patches of shrubs in the Andean paramo. In the region that the type specimen was collected, the shrubs were dominated by Chuquiraga. The terrain in which it was found included hilly regions, steep terrain, rocky outcrops, and stream banks. O. cyanolaemus was observed to feed by clinging to branches sideways or upside down, or by perching next to flowers. It was observed feeding most frequently from Chuquiraga jussieui, and also from Macleania rupestris and Lleresia hypoleuca. Collected males were also found to have eaten flies. Some females were once observed making aerial sallies after swarming flies. Blue-throated hillstars were frequently observed being chased away from perches by Shining Sunbeams (Aglaeactis cupripenni). Aggressive interactions were also seen between it and the Viridian metaltail (Metallura williami).

== Distribution and conservation ==
The species is endemic to an area of about 114 square kilometres (28,000 acres) where it is found along bush-lined creeks on small ridges not surpassing 3700 m. The range of this species is restricted by the Jubones-León river valley to the north and northeast and the Puyango-Catamayo drainage basin to the south. No more than 750 individuals have been estimated to exist, and this population is highly threatened by fire, grazing, and gold mining.

Nature and Culture International is working with Ecuador’s Ministry of Environment, Ministry of Tourism, Water Secretary, municipalities of Saraguro and Zaruma, Kawsay Foundation and local and indigenous communities to establish a new conservation area for this species. The proposed area – spanning around 175,000 acres in Cerro de Arcos – will protect the blue-throated hillstar’s entire habitat in addition to critical páramo and cloud forest ecosystems, wetlands and important water sources. The area will also preserve portions of the Inca trail, an ancient trail used by the Inca empire to connect Cuzco with its northern capital, Quito.
