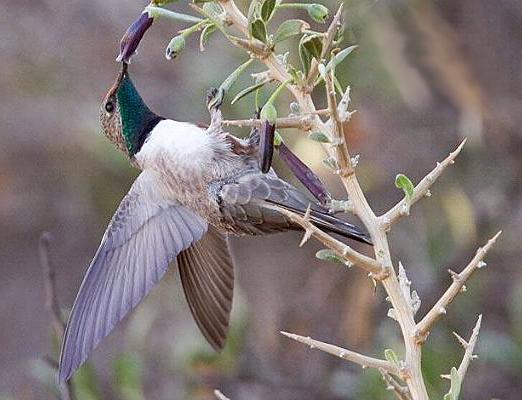

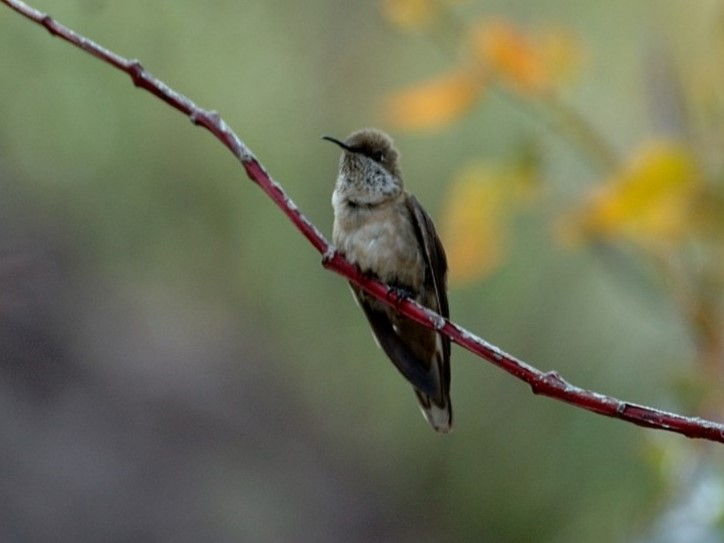
- Male above, female below

Conservation status
- Least Concern (IUCN 3.1)
- CITES Appendix II

Scientific classification
- Kingdom: Animalia
- Phylum: Chordata
- Class: Aves
- Order: Apodiformes
- Family: Trochilidae
- Genus: Oreotrochilus
- Species: O. estella

Binomial name
- Oreotrochilus estella (d'Orbigny, 1838)
- Combined distribution (green) of Andean and green-headed hillstars in South America

= Andean hillstar =

Species of hummingbird

The Andean hillstar (Oreotrochilus estella) is a species of hummingbird in the "coquettes", tribe Lesbiini of subfamily Lesbiinae. It is found in Argentina, Bolivia, Chile, and Peru.

== Taxonomy and systematics ==
The Andean hillstar as known in 2022 has two subspecies, the nominate O. e. estella and O. e. bolivianus. Subspecies bolivianus has been variously treated as a separate species and as indistinguishable from the nominate and therefore not a subspecies; these treatments have not been accepted by current taxomomies. Until 2019 what is now the green-headed hillstar (O. stolzmanni) was considered a third subspecies of the Andean. The white-sided hillstar (O. leucopleurus) has been suggested as another subspecies of the Andean rather than a full species but that treatment has also not been accepted.

== Description ==
The Andean hillstar is 13 to 15 cm (5.1 to 5.9 in) long. Males weigh about 8.8 g (0.31 oz) and females about 8.0 g (0.28 oz). Adults have a medium length slightly decurved black bill. The adult male of the nominate subspecies has drab brown upperparts. It has a shiny green gorget with a black border that separates it from the white breast and belly. The belly has a rufous stripe down its middle into the vent area. The forked tail's central pair of feathers are bronzy black; the rest are mostly white with bronzy black edges and tips on the outermost. The female is also dull brown above, and below as well. Its throat is pale with fine dark speckles. The tail is greenish black and the outer three or four pairs of feathers are white at the bases and tips. The juvenile is overall more grayish than the adult and the male has a dark blue-green gorget. Adult males of subspecies O. e. bolivianus are very similar to the nominate but the stripe on the belly is chestnut with black spots.

== Distribution and habitat ==
The Andean hillstar is a bird of the high central Andes. The nominate subspecies is found from southwestern Peru's Department of Ayacucho south through western Bolivia and northern Chile into northwestern Argentina as far as Tucumán Province. O. e. bolivianus is restricted to Bolivia's Cochabamba Department. The species inhabits puna grasslands, especially areas with rock outcroppings. It also commonly occurs near houses, in Puya raimondii stands, and at the edges of Polylepis woodlands. In elevation it ranges from 2,400 to 5,000 m (7,900 to 16,400 ft) but is most common between 3,500 and 4,500 m (11,500 and 14,800 ft). The species is unusually well adapted to cold nights and winter, which it survives by reducing its metabolic rate utilizing a state of torpor to something like that of hibernation in caves and deep crevices. This shelter is also hypothesized to protect it from nocturnal predation.

== Behavior ==
=== Movement ===
During the breeding season, female Andean hillstars hold territories near rock outcrops while males roam widely. Both sexes may move down from the higher elevations during the Austral winter.

=== Feeding ===
The Andean hillstar feeds on nectar at a variety of flowering shrubs, cacti, and trees. It perches to feed rather than hovering, a trait that might have evolved in order to save energy at its high elevation. The aster family shrub Chuquiraga spinosa likely evolved side by side with the Andean hillstar as this hummingbird is its primary pollinator. In addition to nectar, the species gleans arthropods from vegetation and sometimes catches them on the wing.

=== Breeding ===
The Andean hillstar's breeding season spans from September to February. Females hold territories and nest semi-colonially in bushy gorges with rocks. The nest is a large wooly cup glued to a rock face or sometimes under the "skirt" of a Puya raimondii plant. The clutch size is two eggs, incubation takes 20 days, and fledging occurs up to 38 days after hatch depending on temperature. The species is thought to sometimes lay two clutches in a season.

=== Vocalization ===
The Andean hillstar makes "a repeated short 'tsip' or 'swit', and while chasing, "a rapid, melodious, passerine-like twittering".

== Status ==
The IUCN has assessed the Andean hillstar as being of Least Concern. Though its population size is unknown, it is believed to be stable. It is one of the most common birds of the puna grasslands and occurs is several protected areas.

== External viewing ==
- Episode 2 of David Attenborough's "The Life of Birds", titled "Mastery of Flight".
