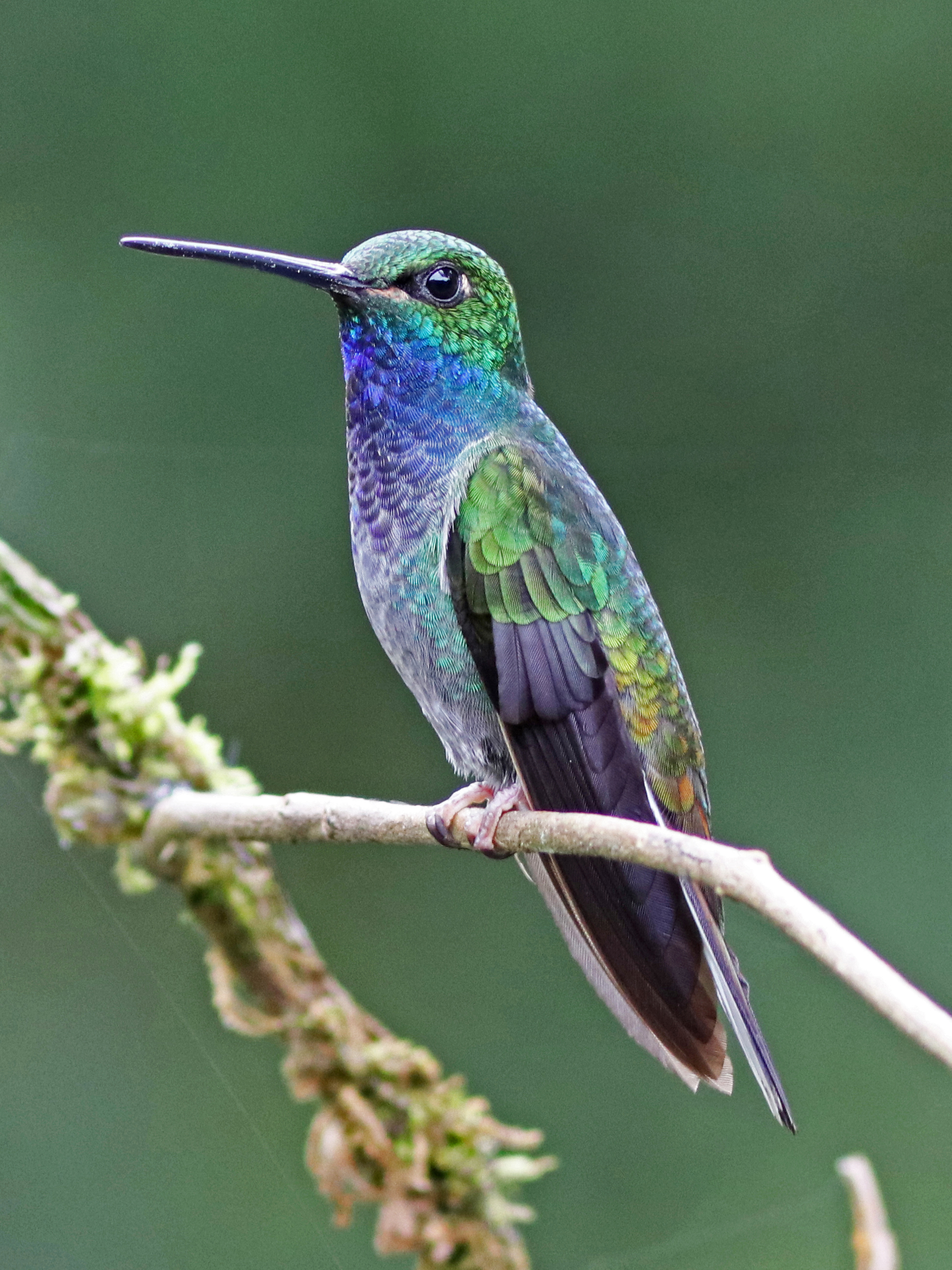

Conservation status
- Least Concern (IUCN 3.1)
- CITES Appendix II

Scientific classification
- Kingdom: Animalia
- Phylum: Chordata
- Class: Aves
- Order: Apodiformes
- Family: Trochilidae
- Genus: Urochroa; Gould, 1856
- Species: U. leucura

Binomial name
- Urochroa leucura Lawrence, 1864

= Green-backed hillstar =

Species of hummingbird

The green-backed hillstar (Urochroa leucura), formerly included in the white-tailed hillstar, is a species of hummingbird in the "brilliants", tribe Heliantheini in subfamily Lesbiinae. It is found in Colombia, Ecuador, and Peru.

== Taxonomy and systematics ==
The green-backed hillstar and what is now the rufous-gaped hillstar (Urochroa bougueri) were once treated as a single species, the "white-tailed hillstar". (BirdLife International's Handbook of the Birds of the World retains the "white-tailed" name for the present species.) They are the only two members of their genus. Although they share the name "hillstar" with the members of genus Oreotrochilus, they are quite different and not closely related. The green-backed hillstar is monotypic.

== Description ==
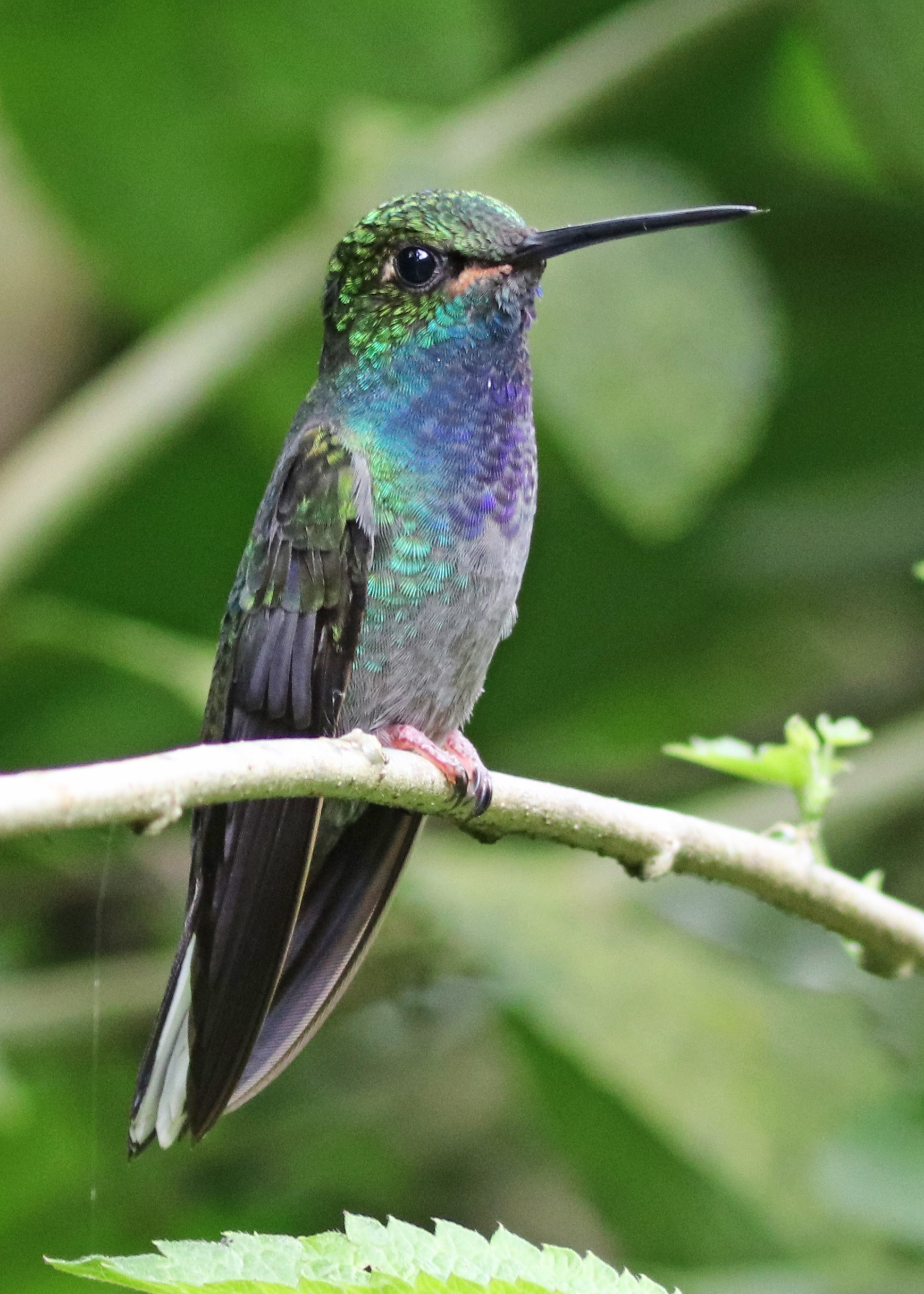
Juvenile showing thin rufous malar

The green-backed hillstar is 13 to 14 cm (5.1 to 5.5 in) long including its approximately 3 cm (1.2 in) bill. It weighs about 8.7 g (0.31 oz). The sexes are alike, though the female is somewhate duller than the male. They have bronzy green upperparts with bronzy uppertail coverts, an iridescent blue throat and breast, and a dull gray belly. Their central tail feathers are bronzy and the others white with dusky gray outer edges. Juveniles are similar to adults with the addition of buffy fringes on the head feathers and a slight buffy malar streak.

== Distribution and habitat ==
The green-backed hillstar is found on the east slope of the Andes from southern Colombia through eastern Ecuador and disjunctly in northeastern Peru. It inhabits the interior and edges of mature montane forest and secondary forest, and also shrubby slopes, and is often found near streams. In Colombia and Ecuador it generally ranges between elevations of 1,600 and 2,800 m (5,200 and 9,200 ft), and is most numerous at about 1,800 m (5,900 ft). In Peru it is known only between 800 and 1,500 m (2,600 and 4,900 ft).

== Behavior ==
=== Movement ===
Though the green-backed hillstar is generally sedentary, it makes some seasonal elevational movements.

=== Feeding ===
The green-backed hillstar usually forages in the lower and middle strata of the forest but occasionally in the canopy. Males defend feeding territories at stands of flowering vegetation. It takes nectar mostly from plants of genera Inga, Bomarea, Psammisia, and Cavendishia. In addition to feeding on nectar it captures small insects by hawking from a perch.

=== Breeding ===
The green-backed hillstar's breeding phenology has not been documented.

=== Vocalization ===
What is thought to be the green-backed hillstar's song is "a continuous series of single 'tseee', 'tsing' or 'seeuw' notes". It also makes "a liquid 'twit', repeated in long sequences.

== Status ==
The IUCN has assessed the green-backed hillstar as being of Least Concern, though its population size and trend are unknown. No immediate threats have been identified. It is considered fairly common in Colombia, uncommon to rare in Ecuador, and rare and local in Peru.
