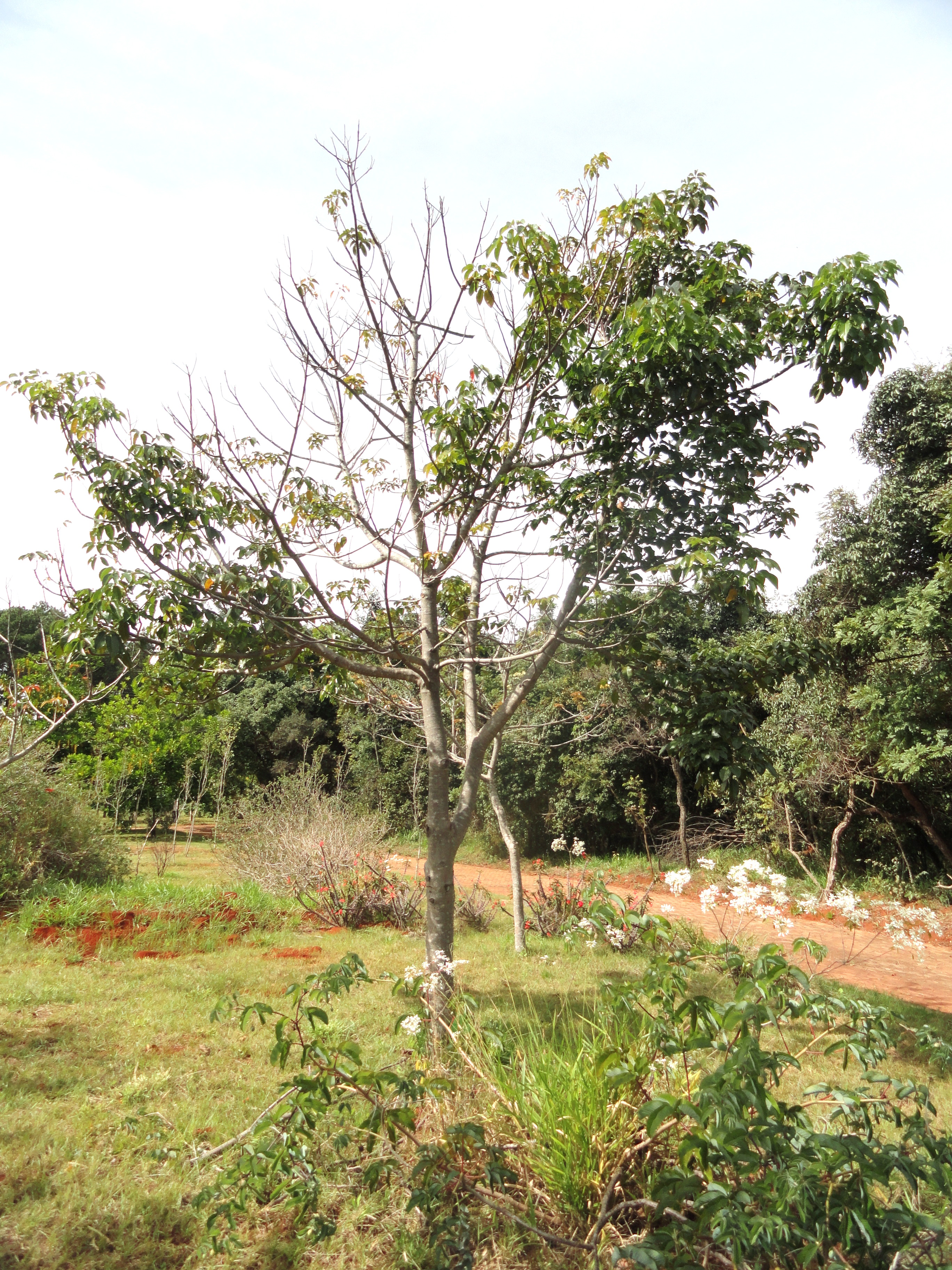
- Joannesia princeps

Scientific classification
- Kingdom: Plantae
- Clade: Tracheophytes
- Clade: Angiosperms
- Clade: Eudicots
- Clade: Rosids
- Order: Malpighiales
- Family: Euphorbiaceae
- Subfamily: Crotonoideae
- Tribe: Jatropheae
- Genus: Joannesia; Vell. 1798 not Pers. 1807 (Asteraceae)

Synonyms
- Anda A.Juss.; Andicus Vell.; Andiscus Vell.

= Joannesia =

Genus of flowering plants in the spurge family

Joannesia is a genus of plants in the family Euphorbiaceae, first described as a genus in 1798. The entire genus is endemic to Brazil.

== Etymology ==
Joannesia is a taxonomic patronym honoring the king John VI of Portugal.

The name Joannesia yielded a taxonomic anagram for the confamilial genus Annesijoa.

== Systematics ==
Species

1. Joannesia heveoides Ducke – Amazonas State in Brazil
2. Joannesia princeps Vell. – eastern Brazil (Distrito Federal, Espírito Santo, Minas Gerais, Rio de Janeiro)

Species in homonymic genus

In 1807, Persoon used the same name, Joannesia, to a very different plant. He thus created an illegitimate homonym, contrary to the rules of nomenclature. So the one species name that he had created in this illegitimate genus had to be renamed, as follows:

- Joannesia insignis Pers. – Chuquiraga jussieui J.F.Gmel.
