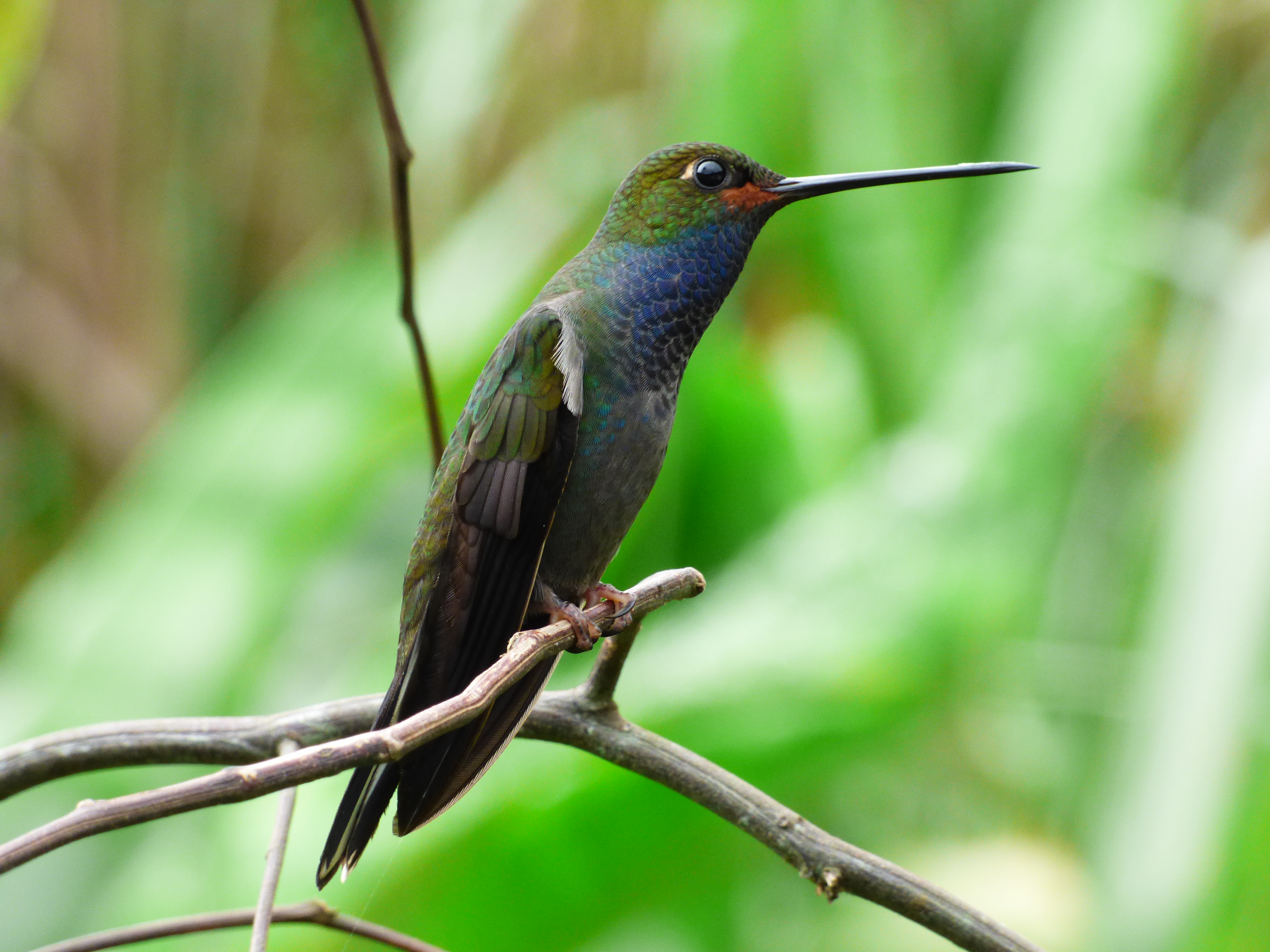

Conservation status
- Least Concern (IUCN 3.1)
- CITES Appendix II

Scientific classification
- Kingdom: Animalia
- Phylum: Chordata
- Class: Aves
- Order: Apodiformes
- Family: Trochilidae
- Genus: Urochroa
- Species: U. bougueri

Binomial name
- Urochroa bougueri (Bourcier, 1851)

= Rufous-gaped hillstar =

Species of hummingbird

The rufous-gaped hillstar (Urochroa bougueri), formerly included in the white-tailed hillstar, is a species of hummingbird in the "brilliants", tribe Heliantheini in subfamily Lesbiinae. It is found in Colombia and Ecuador.

== Taxonomy ==
The rufous-gaped hillstar was formally described in 1851 by the French ornithologist Jules Bourcier based on a specimen that he had collected in Ecuador. He placed it in the genus Trochilus and coined the binomial name Trochilus bougueri. The species is now placed in the genus Urochroa that was introduced in 1856 by the English ornithologist John Gould. The genus name combines the Ancient Greek oura meaning "tail" with khroa meaning "colour" or "complexion". The specific epithet bougueri was chosen to honour the French mathematician Pierre Bouguer who had visited Peru in 1736–1742.

The rufous-gaped hillstar and what is now the green-backed hillstar (Urochroa leucura) were once treated as a single species, the "white-tailed hillstar". They are the only two members of their genus. Although they share the name "hillstar" with the members of genus Oreotrochilus, they are quite different and not closely related. The rufous-gaped hillstar is monotypic.

== Description ==
The rufous-gaped hillstar is 13 to 14 cm (5.1 to 5.5 in) long including its approximately 3 cm (1.2 in) bill. It weighs 8.5 to 12.5 g (0.30 to 0.44 oz). The sexes are alike. They have a long, straight, black bill and coppery green upperparts. The English name comes from the rufous-cinnamon malar streak on the face. The throat and breast are iridescent blue and the belly dull gray. The central and outermost tail feathers are black and the rest white with dusky gray edges. Juveniles are similar to adults with the addition of buffy fringes on the head feathers.

What is thought to be the rufous-gaped hillstar's song is "a continuous series of single 'swit' or 'tsit' notes". It also makes "a liquid 'twit', repeated in long sequences when alarmed."

== Distribution and habitat ==
The rufous-gaped hillstar is found on the Pacific slope of the Andes from Colombia's Chocó Department south into Ecuador as far as Pichincha Province. It inhabits the interior and edges of mature montane forest and secondary forest, and also shrubby slopes, and is often found near streams. In elevation it generally ranges between 1,600 and 2,800 m (5,200 and 9,200 ft). It is most numerous at about 1,800 m (5,900 ft) and is occasionally found well below its usual minimum elevation. Though the rufous-gaped hillstar is generally sedentary, it makes some seasonal elevational movements, at least in Colombia.

== Behavior ==
=== Feeding ===
The rufous-gaped hillstar usually forages in the lower and middle strata of the forest but occasionally in the canopy. Males defend feeding territories at stands of flowering vegetation. It takes nectar mostly from plants of genera Inga, Bomarea, Psammisia, and Cavendishia. In addition to feeding on nectar it captures small insects by hawking from a perch.

=== Breeding ===
The rufous-gaped hillstar's breeding season in Colombia spans from December to March; it has not been documented in Ecuador. It builds a cup nest of moss and lichen on a vertical branch, typically 8 to 12 m (26 to 39 ft) high in a tall tree. The female incubates the clutch of two eggs for 16 to 18 days; fledging occurs 23 to 25 days after hatch.

== Status ==
The IUCN has assessed the rufous-gaped hillstar as being of Least Concern, though its population size and trend are unknown. No immediate threats have been identified. It is considered uncommon to rare in Ecuador and fairly common in Colombia, and occurs in at least two protected areas in the latter.
