= Chuquiraga arcuata =

Conservation status
- Endangered (IUCN 3.1)

Scientific classification
- Kingdom: Plantae
- Clade: Tracheophytes
- Clade: Angiosperms
- Clade: Eudicots
- Clade: Asterids
- Order: Asterales
- Family: Asteraceae
- Genus: Chuquiraga
- Species: C. arcuata

Binomial name
- Chuquiraga arcuata Harling

Species of flowering plant

Chuquiraga arcuata is a species of flowering plant in the family Asteraceae. It is endemic to Ecuador. Its natural habitat is subtropical or tropical dry shrubland. It is threatened by habitat loss.
