= Deutzianthus tonkinensis =

Conservation status
- Near Threatened (IUCN 2.3)

Scientific classification
- Kingdom: Plantae
- Clade: Tracheophytes
- Clade: Angiosperms
- Clade: Eudicots
- Clade: Rosids
- Order: Malpighiales
- Family: Euphorbiaceae
- Genus: Deutzianthus
- Species: D. tonkinensis

Binomial name
- Deutzianthus tonkinensis Gagnep.

Species of tree

Deutzianthus tonkinensis (Vietnamese: mọ or giát) is a species of small tree up to 12 metres (39 ft) tall in the family Euphorbiaceae. It is found in southern China (SW Guangxi, S Yunnan) and northern Vietnam. The species is under second-class national protection in China.

Within Nonggang Natural Reserve in southern Guangxi, D. tonkinensis is the dominant tree species; however, its young leaves contributed only a minor proportion to the diet of the herbivorous monkey François' langur.

In Vietnam, D. tonkinensis can be found in many national reserves. Its light wood was used to make furniture, chests, stationery products, match sticks, and clogs.
