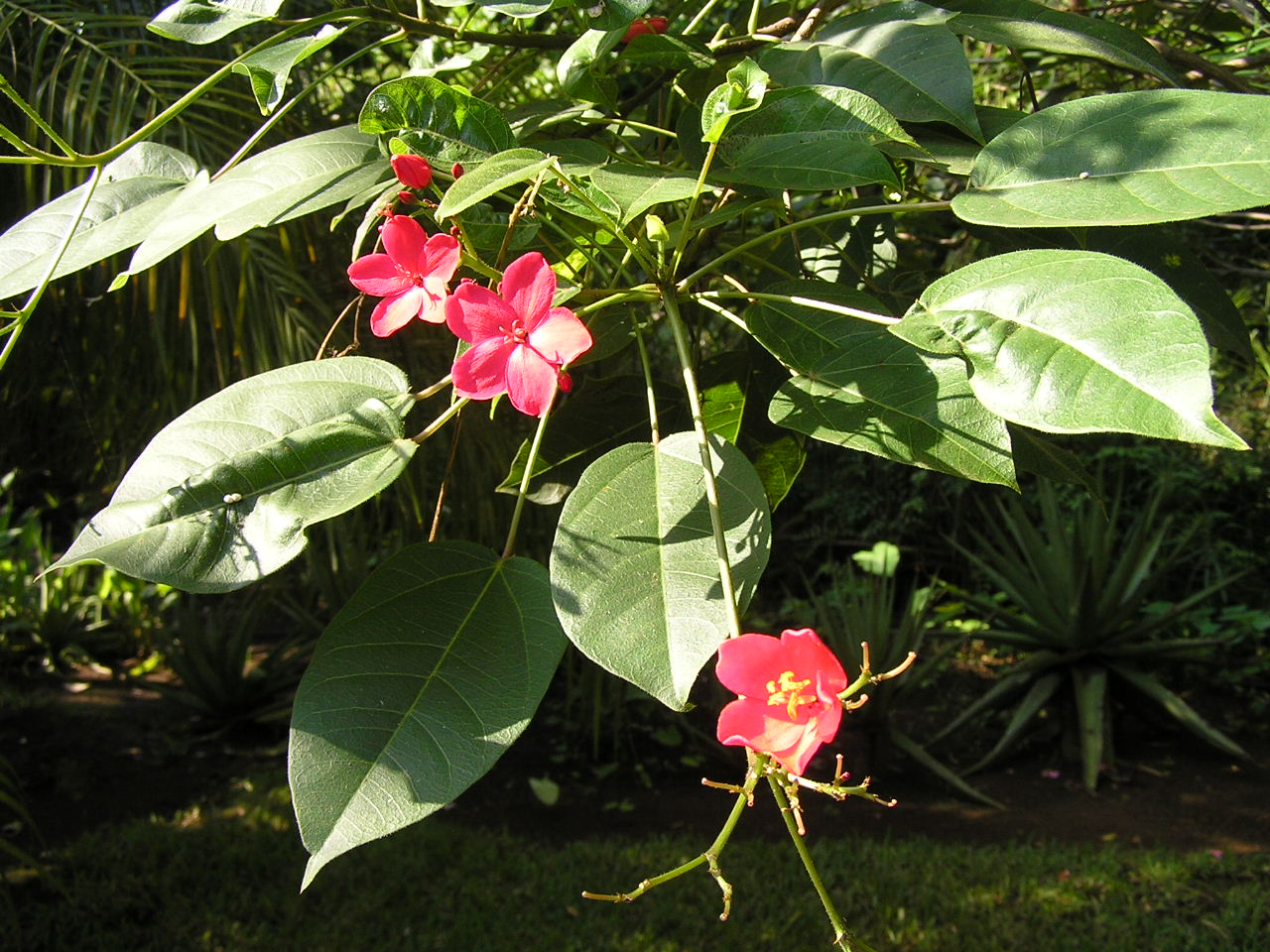
- Jatropha integerrima

Scientific classification
- Kingdom: Plantae
- Clade: Tracheophytes
- Clade: Angiosperms
- Clade: Eudicots
- Clade: Rosids
- Order: Malpighiales
- Family: Euphorbiaceae
- Subfamily: Crotonoideae
- Tribe: Jatropheae; Pax

Genera
- Annesijoa; Deutzianthus; Jatropha; Joannesia; Leeuwenbergia; Loerzingia; Oligoceras; Vaupesia

= Jatropheae =

Tribe of flowering plants

The Jatropheae are a tribe of the subfamily Crotonoideae, under the family Euphorbiaceae. It comprises eight genera.

== See also ==
- Taxonomy of the Euphorbiaceae
