= Leeuwenbergia =

Scientific classification
- Kingdom: Plantae
- Clade: Tracheophytes
- Clade: Angiosperms
- Clade: Eudicots
- Clade: Rosids
- Order: Malpighiales
- Family: Euphorbiaceae
- Subfamily: Crotonoideae
- Tribe: Jatropheae
- Genus: Leeuwenbergia; Letouzey & N.Hallé

Genus of flowering plants

Leeuwenbergia is a plant genus of the family Euphorbiaceae first described as a genus in 1974 and named in honor of Toon Leeuwenberg. The entire genus is endemic to tropical west-central Africa.

Species

1. Leeuwenbergia africana Letouzey & N.Hallé - Cameroon, Gabon, Republic of the Congo, Democratic Republic of the Congo
2. Leeuwenbergia letestui Letouzey & N.Hallé - Gabon
