= Oligoceras =

Scientific classification
- Kingdom: Plantae
- Clade: Tracheophytes
- Clade: Angiosperms
- Clade: Eudicots
- Clade: Rosids
- Order: Malpighiales
- Family: Euphorbiaceae
- Subfamily: Crotonoideae
- Tribe: Jatropheae
- Genus: Oligoceras; Gagnep.
- Species: O. eberhardtii

Binomial name
- Oligoceras eberhardtii Gagnep.

Genus of flowering plants

Oligoceras is a plant genus of the family Euphorbiaceae, first described as a genus in 1924. It contains only one known species, Oligoceras eberhardtii, endemic to Vietnam.
