= Deutzianthus =

Scientific classification
- Kingdom: Plantae
- Clade: Tracheophytes
- Clade: Angiosperms
- Clade: Eudicots
- Clade: Rosids
- Order: Malpighiales
- Family: Euphorbiaceae
- Subfamily: Crotonoideae
- Tribe: Jatropheae
- Genus: Deutzianthus; Gagnep.

Synonyms
- Loerzingia Airy Shaw

Genus of flowering plants

Deutzianthus is a genus of trees, from the family Euphorbiaceae. It was first described as a genus in 1924. They are found in Vietnam, southern China, and Sumatra.

Species

1. Deutzianthus thyrsiflorus (Airy Shaw) G.L.Webster - Sumatra
2. Deutzianthus tonkinensis Gagnep. - Yunnan, Guangxi, Vietnam
