= Annesijoa =

- An animation showing the anagrammatical origin of the genus of Euphorbiaceae name Annesijoa from the genus name Joannesia

Conservation status
- Least Concern (IUCN 3.1)

Scientific classification
- Kingdom: Plantae
- Clade: Embryophytes
- Clade: Tracheophytes
- Clade: Spermatophytes
- Clade: Angiosperms
- Clade: Eudicots
- Clade: Rosids
- Order: Malpighiales
- Family: Euphorbiaceae
- Subfamily: Crotonoideae
- Tribe: Jatropheae
- Genus: Annesijoa; Pax & K.Hoffm.
- Species: A. novoguineensis

Binomial name
- Annesijoa novoguineensis Pax & K.Hoffm.

Genus of flowering plants in the spurge family

Annesijoa is a monotypic genus of plants in the family Euphorbiaceae. The sole species, Annesijoa novoguineensis, is endemic to New Guinea.

== Etymology ==
Annesijoa is a taxonomic anagram derived from the name of the confamilial genus Joannesia. The latter name is a taxonomic patronym honoring the king John VI of Portugal.
