= Vaupesia =

Scientific classification
- Kingdom: Plantae
- Clade: Tracheophytes
- Clade: Angiosperms
- Clade: Eudicots
- Clade: Rosids
- Order: Malpighiales
- Family: Euphorbiaceae
- Subfamily: Crotonoideae
- Tribe: Jatropheae
- Genus: Vaupesia; R.E.Schult.
- Species: V. cataractarum

Binomial name
- Vaupesia cataractarum R.E.Schult.

Genus of flowering plants

Vaupesia is a plant genus of the family Euphorbiaceae first described as a genus in 1955. It contains only one known species, Vaupesia cataractarum, native to southeastern Colombia and northwestern Brazil.
