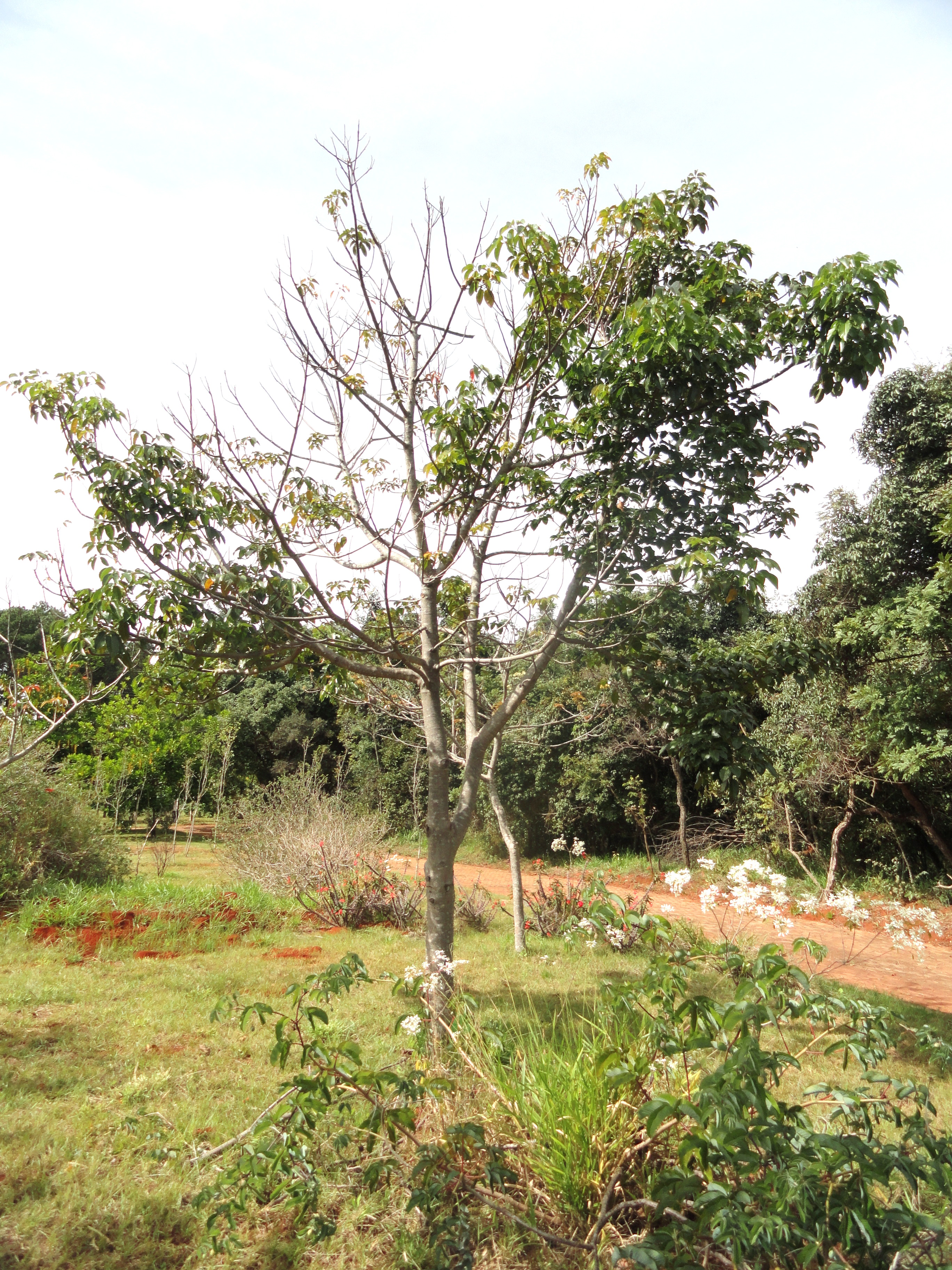

Conservation status
- Vulnerable (IUCN 2.3)

Scientific classification
- Kingdom: Plantae
- Clade: Tracheophytes
- Clade: Angiosperms
- Clade: Eudicots
- Clade: Rosids
- Order: Malpighiales
- Family: Euphorbiaceae
- Genus: Joannesia
- Species: J. princeps

Binomial name
- Joannesia princeps Vell.

= Joannesia princeps =

Species of tree

Joannesia princeps, the arara nut-tree or andá-açu, is a species of moderate-sized tree in the family Euphorbiaceae, with a spreading canopy, large alternate and long petioled leaves, and coarse branches. Flowers are monoecious, and fruit is a large drupe. It is endemic to east Minas Gerais, north Espírito Santo to the south of Bahia, Brazil, and threatened by habitat loss.
