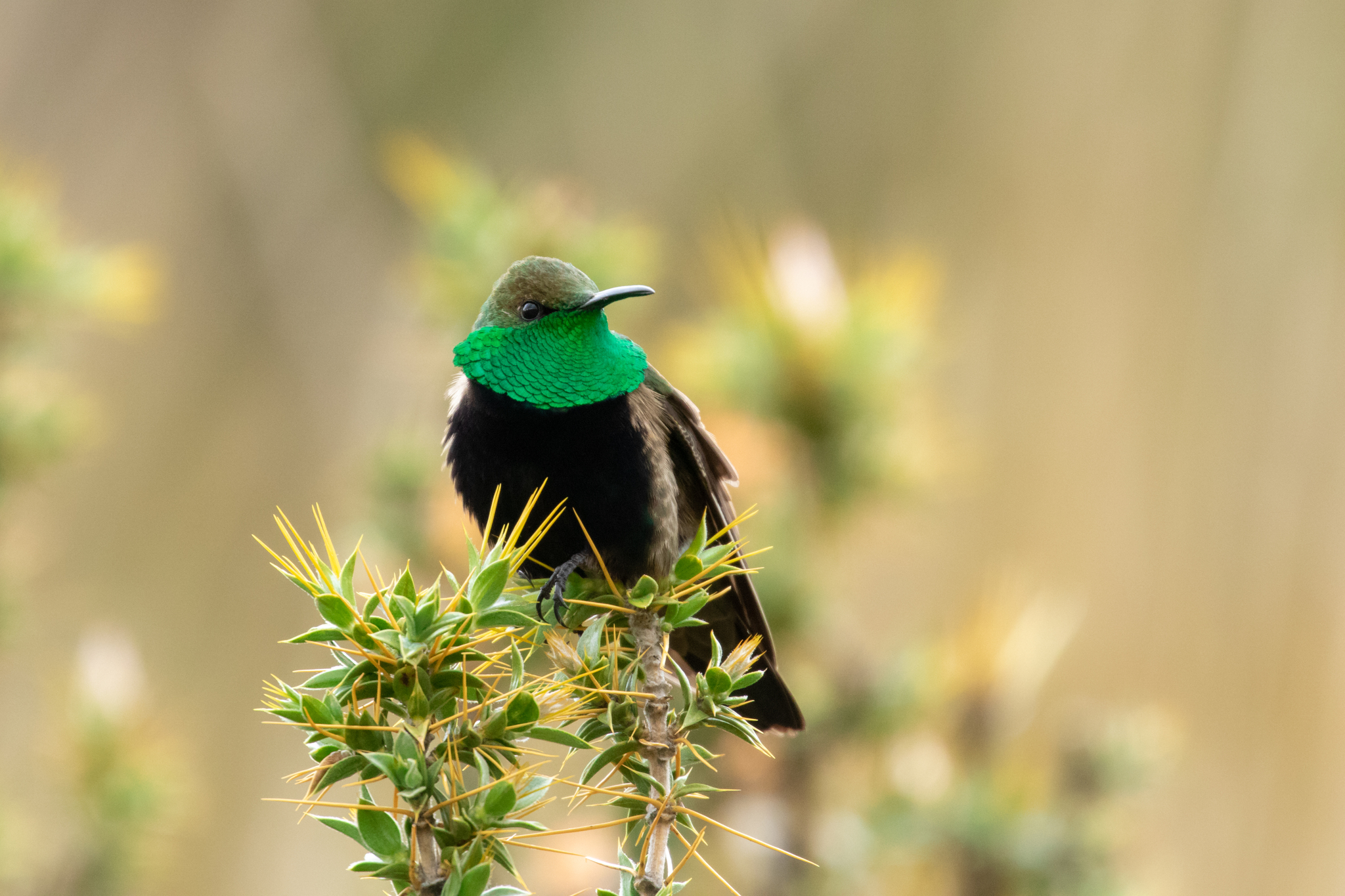
- O. melanogaster observed in Peru

Conservation status
- Least Concern (IUCN 3.1)
- CITES Appendix II

Scientific classification
- Kingdom: Animalia
- Phylum: Chordata
- Class: Aves
- Order: Apodiformes
- Family: Trochilidae
- Genus: Oreotrochilus
- Species: O. melanogaster

Binomial name
- Oreotrochilus melanogaster Gould, 1847
- Distribution in Peru (green)

= Black-breasted hillstar =

Species of hummingbird

The black-breasted hillstar (Oreotrochilus melanogaster) is a species of hummingbird in the "coquettes", tribe Lesbiini of subfamily Lesbiinae. It is endemic to Peru.

== Taxonomy and systematics ==
The black-breasted hillstar is monotypic.

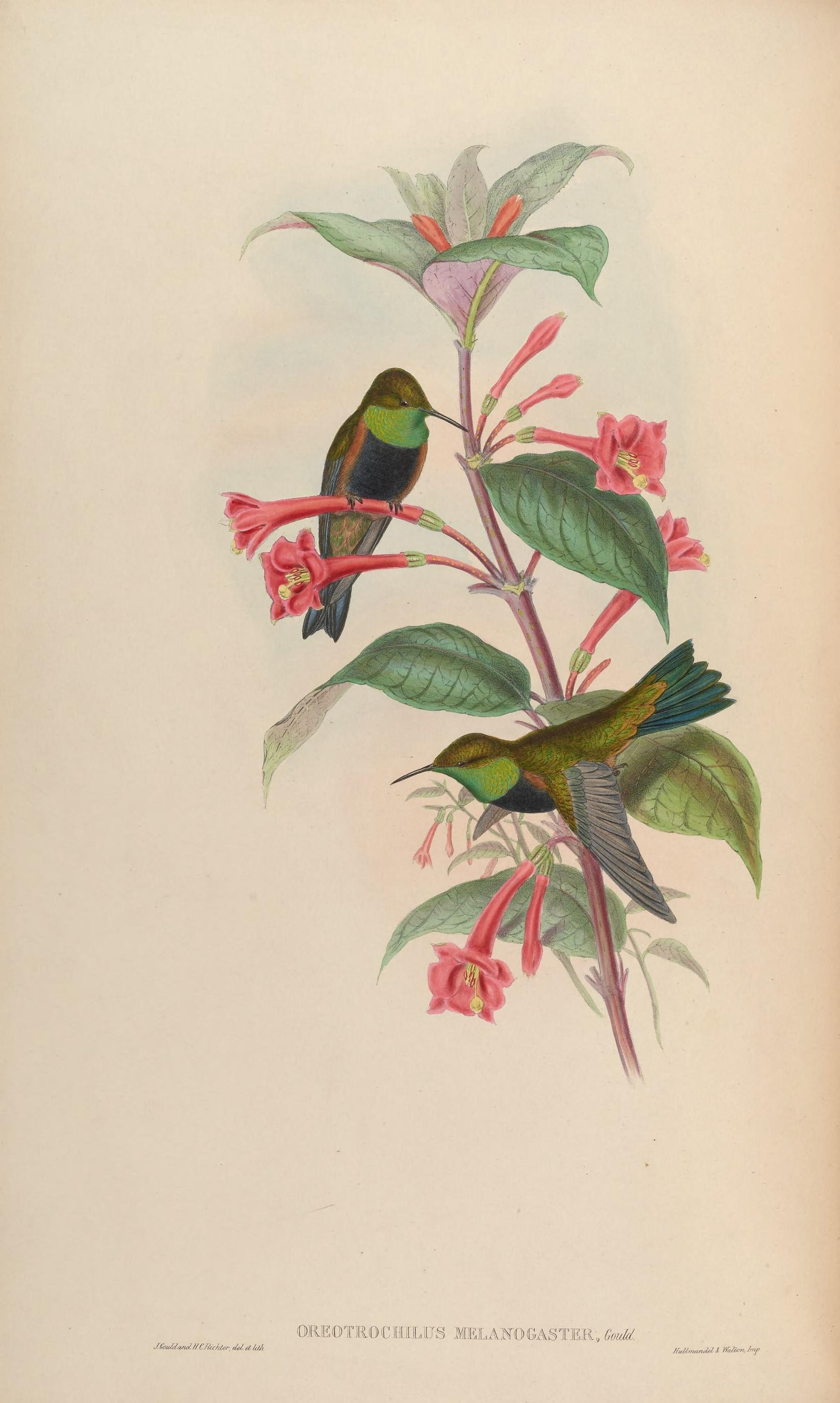
Two males in a plate from A monograph of the Trochilidæ, or family of humming-birds.

== Description ==
The black-breasted hillstar is 13 to 14 cm (5.1 to 5.5 in) long and weighs about 8.4 g (0.30 oz). Adults have a medium length slightly decurved black bill. The male's upperparts are bronzy brown. It has a shining emerald green gorget, grayish brown flanks, and entirely black breast, belly, and vent area. The tail is slightly forked and blue-black. The female is dull bronzy brown above and below. Its throat is pale with fine dark speckles. The tail is greenish black and the outer three or four pairs of feathers are white at their tips.

== Distribution and habitat ==
The black-breasted hillstar is found in the central Andes of Peru, primarily in the departments of Junín and Huancavelica. Its range also extends slightly into the adjacent departments of Ancash, Lima, Pasco, and Ayacucho. It inhabits puna grasslands, especially areas with much Chuquiraga spinosa and cushion cacti, and some rock outcroppings as well. It also commonly occurs in gardens and has been noted in Puya raimondii stands. In elevation it ranges between 3,500 and 4,400 metres (11,500 and 14,400 ft).

== Behavior ==
=== Movement ===
The black-breasted hillstar is a year-round resident in Junín but in Huancavelica it might leave the puna after cacti stop flowering.

=== Feeding ===
The black-breasted hillstar feeds on nectar primarily from Chuquiraga spinosa in Junín; in Huancavelica it favors cactus flowers. It feeds at other flowering plants as well, especially red ones, by trap-lining, and will feed at Eucalyptus. It hawks for insects on the wing.

=== Breeding ===
The black-breasted hillstar nests in February and March. It glues a large cup nest to a vertical substrate such as a sheltered rock face and even under the eaves of buildings. The clutch size is two white eggs. Little else is known about the species' breeding phenology.

=== Vocalization ===
The black-breasted hillstar's vocalizations are not well known, but it makes a "fast squeaky twittering with rising and falling sequences" when chasing.

== Status ==
The IUCN has assessed the black-breasted hillstar as being of Least Concern. Though its population size is unknown, it is believed to be stable. The species is fairly common to abundant, and its "puna slope habitat is not under particular threat in this region."
