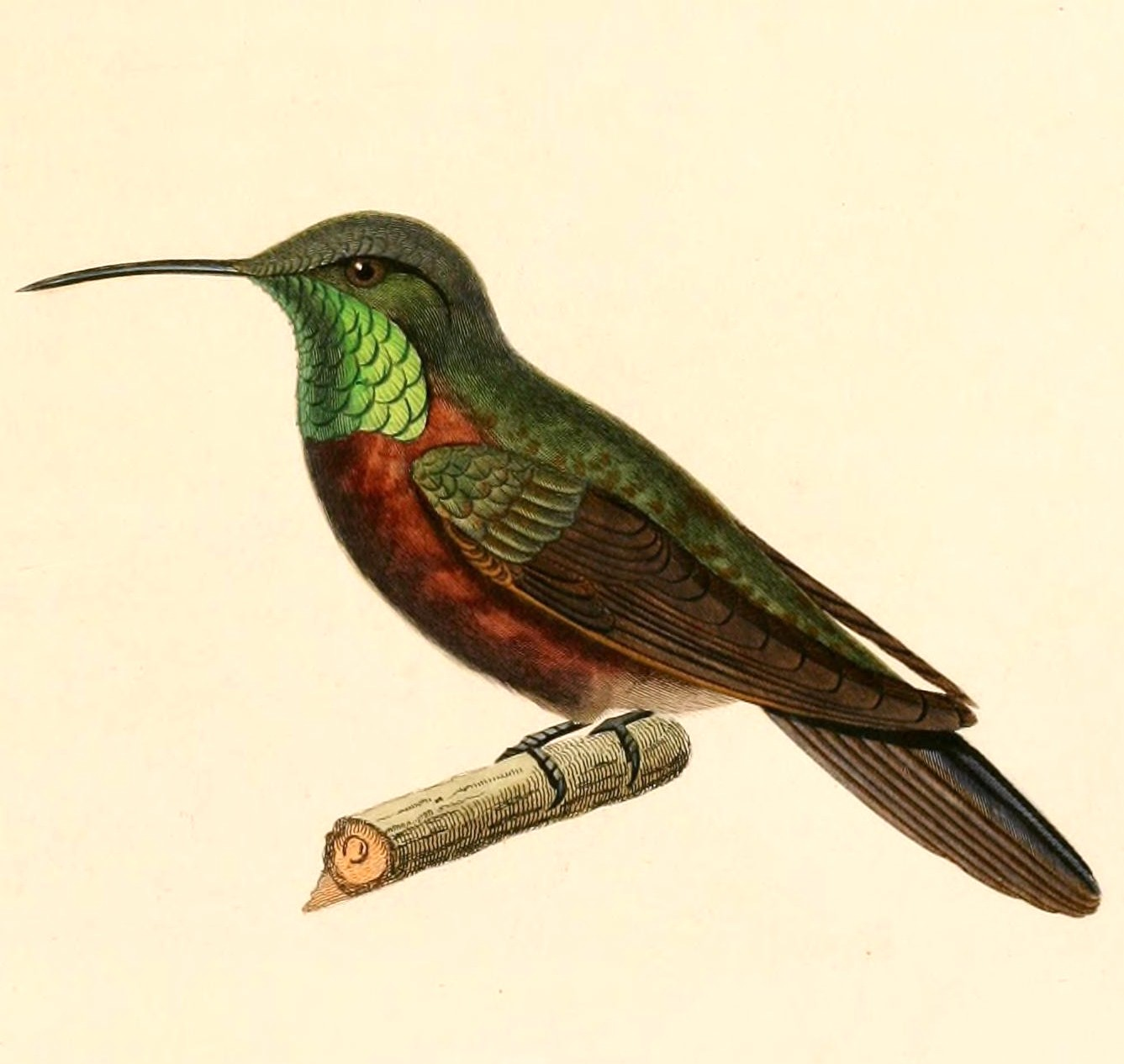

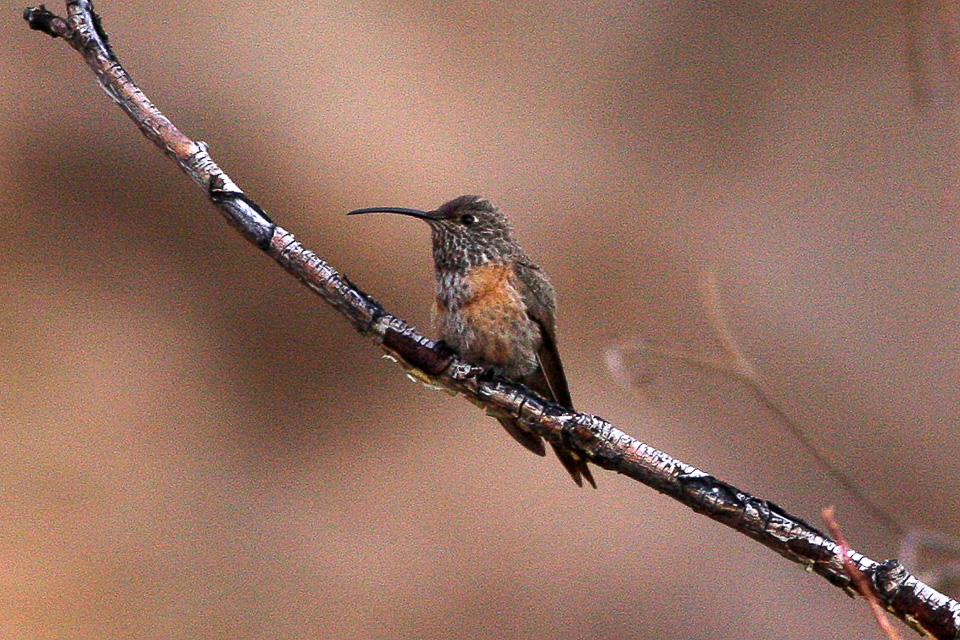
- Male above, female below

Conservation status
- Least Concern (IUCN 3.1)
- CITES Appendix II

Scientific classification
- Kingdom: Animalia
- Phylum: Chordata
- Class: Aves
- Order: Apodiformes
- Family: Trochilidae
- Genus: Oreotrochilus
- Species: O. adela

Binomial name
- Oreotrochilus adela (d'Orbigny, 1838)
- Distribution in South America (green)

= Wedge-tailed hillstar =

Species of hummingbird

The wedge-tailed hillstar (Oreotrochilus adela) is a species of hummingbird in the "coquettes", tribe Lesbiini of subfamily Lesbiinae. It is found in Bolivia and Argentina.

== Taxonomy and systematics ==
The wedge-tailed hillstar is monotypic.

== Description ==
The wedge-tailed hillstar is 11 to 13 cm (4.3 to 5.1 in) long and weighs 7.4 to 8.3 g (0.26 to 0.29 oz). Adults have a medium length slightly decurved black bill. Both sexes' upperparts are gray-brown with a bronzy cast. The adult male has a glittering green gorget and chestnut underparts with a bold black stripe down the center. The tail is graduated and mostly blue-black; all but the central feathers have cinnamon inner webs. The adult female's throat is white with grayish and green spots and the rest of the underparts are pale rufous. The tail is blue-black and the outer three or four pairs of feathers are white at their tips. Juveniles are similar to the adult female.

== Distribution and habitat ==
The wedge-tailed hillstar is found from southern La Paz Department in central Bolivia south barely into Jujuy Province in extreme northwestern Argentina. It inhabits semi-arid to seasonally humid areas of the Andes below the puna grasslands. It typically is found among mesophytic shrubs and also often occurs in gullies or basins with stands of Polylepis trees. It will inhabit degraded habitat as long as Dodonaea bushes, taller bushes, and columnar cacti remain. In elevation it ranges from 2,600 to 4,000 metres (8,500 to 13,100 ft).

== Behavior ==
=== Movement ===
The wedge-tailed hillstar's movements are not well known, but local movements and dispersal are suspected.

=== Feeding ===
The wedge-tailed hillstar feeds on nectar from flowering plants; examples include those of genera Barnadesia, Mutisia, and Puya; various mistletoes; and columnar cacti. It also feeds on insects.

=== Breeding ===
The wedge-tailed hillstar's breeding season is not well defined but appears to span from October to perhaps February. Males court by alternately singing and displaying from an open perch and making a deep U-shaped flight. The nest is a large cup glued to a rock face. Nothing else is known about the species' breeding phenology.

=== Vocalization ===
The male wedge-tailed hillstar's display song is "a medley of intense twittering notes interspersed by a distinct descending cadence".

== Status ==
The IUCN originally assessed the wedge-tailed hillstar as Near Threatened but in 2021 reclassified it as being of Least Concern. Its population is estimated at between 2500 and 10,000 mature individuals and is believed to be decreasing. It is generally uncommon but apparently can continue in degraded areas if brushy ravines remain. The human population is dense in its range and there are no protected areas.
