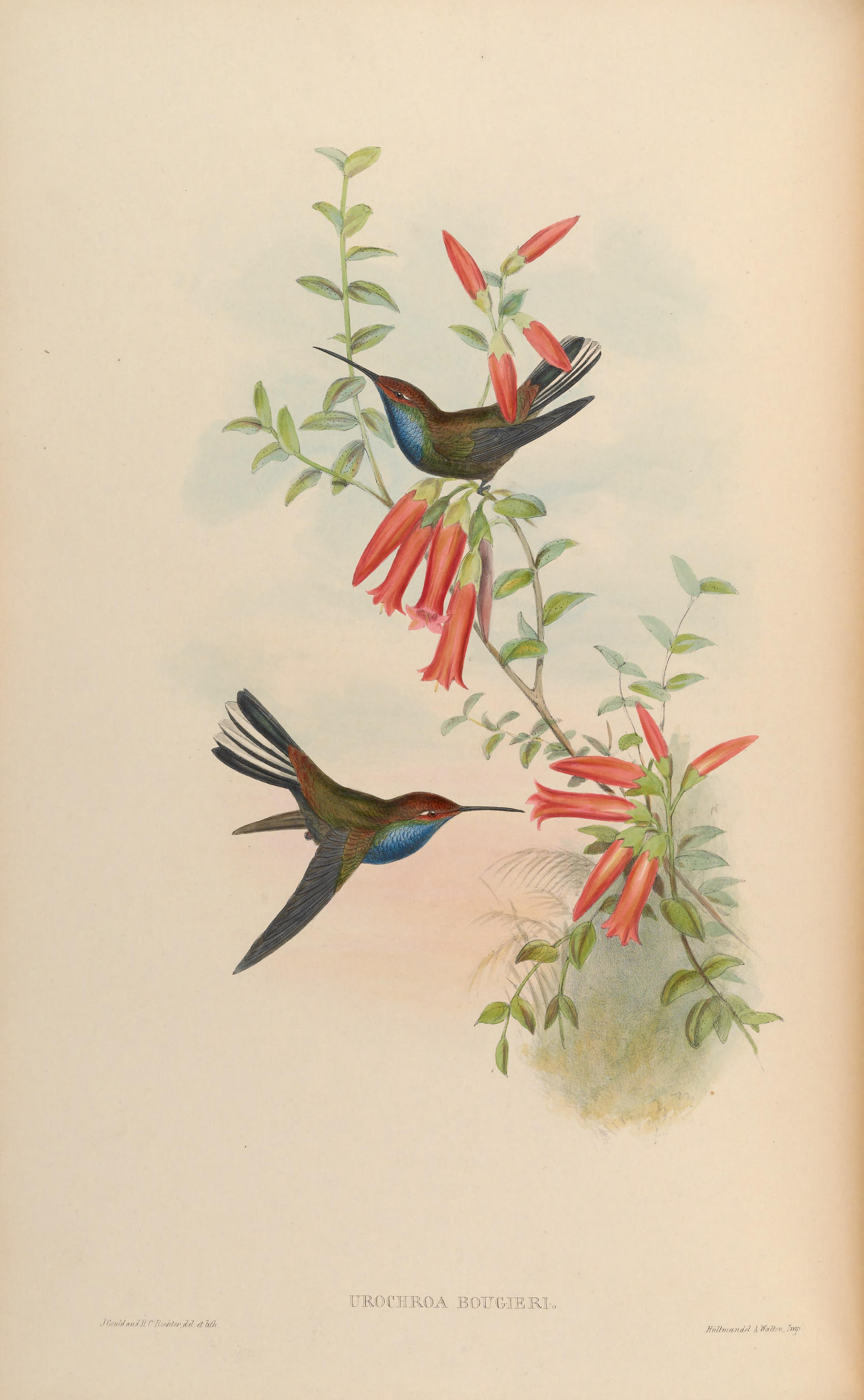
- Urochroa bougueri from A monograph of the Trochilidae, or family of humming-birds Volume 2 (1861)

Scientific classification
- Kingdom: Animalia
- Phylum: Chordata
- Class: Aves
- Order: Apodiformes
- Family: Trochilidae
- Tribe: Heliantheini
- Genus: Urochroa; Gould, 1856

Type species
- Trochilus bougueri (rufous-gaped hillstar) Bourcier, 1851

Species
- Urochroa bougueri; Urochroa leucura

= Urochroa =

Genus of birds

Urochroa is a genus of hummingbird containing two recently-split species.

== Taxonomy ==
The genus Urochroa was introduced in 1856 by the English ornithologist John Gould to accommodate the rufous-gaped hillstar which is thus the type species. The genus name combines the Ancient Greek oura meaning "tail" with khroa meaning "colour" or "complexion".

The green-backed hillstar was formerly considered to be a subspecies of the rufous-gaped hillstar.

== Species ==
The genus contains two species.

Genus Urochroa – Gould, 1856 – two species
Common name	Scientific name and subspecies	Range	Size and ecology	IUCN status and estimated population
Rufous-gaped hillstar	Urochroa bougueri (Bourcier, 1851)	southern Colombia, Ecuador, and northern Peru	Size: Habitat: Diet:	LC
Green-backed hillstar	Urochroa leucura Lawrence, 1864	southern Colombia, Ecuador, and northern Peru	Size: Habitat: Diet:	LC
