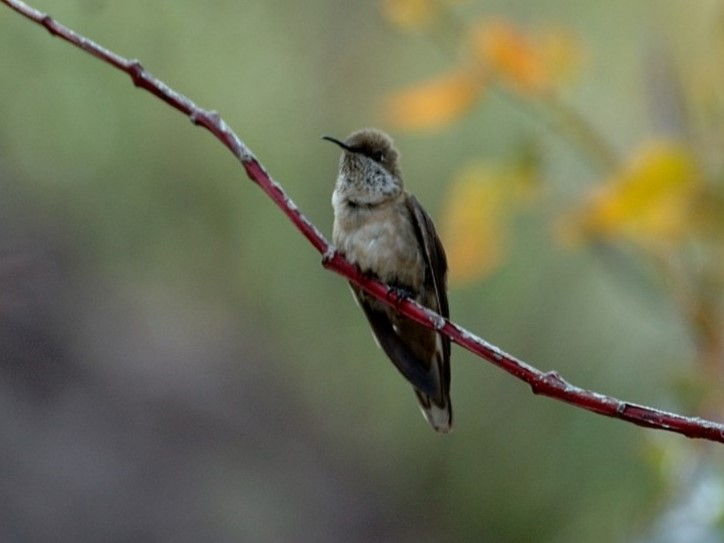
- female Andean hillstar (Oreotrochilus estella)

Scientific classification
- Kingdom: Animalia
- Phylum: Chordata
- Class: Aves
- Clade: Strisores
- Order: Apodiformes
- Family: Trochilidae
- Tribe: Lesbiini
- Genus: Oreotrochilus; Gould, 1847

Type species
- Trochilus estella d'Orbigny 1838

Species
- see text

= Hillstar =

Genus of birds

The hillstars are hummingbirds of the genus Oreotrochilus. They are native to the Andes in South America.

== Taxonomy ==
The genus Oreotrochilus was introduced in 1847 by the English ornithologist John Gould with Trochilus estella d'Orbigny 1838, the Andean hillstar, as the type species. The genus name Oreotrochilus combines the Ancient Greek ορος/oros, ορεος/oreos meaning "mountain" with the genus Trochilus that had been introduced in 1758 by Carl Linnaeus for the hummingbirds.

The Urochroa hillstars are not closely related.

== Species list ==
Their genus contains seven species:

Image	Common name	Scientific name	Distribution
	Ecuadorian hillstar	Oreotrochilus chimborazo	
	Blue-throated hillstar	Oreotrochilus cyanolaemus	
	Green-headed hillstar	Oreotrochilus stolzmanni	
	Black-breasted hillstar	Oreotrochilus melanogaster	
	Andean hillstar	Oreotrochilus estella	
	White-sided hillstar	Oreotrochilus leucopleurus	
	Wedge-tailed hillstar	Oreotrochilus adela	

== Description ==
The birds are approximately 13 centimetres (5.1 in) in length with fairly long, slightly decurved black bills. They are sexually dimorphic. The male usually has an iridescent green throat, or bluish-purple in the Ecuadorian hillstar, with dull greenish upperparts and pale flanks. The central underparts are usually black, but are brown in the Andean hillstar. The tail is usually dark with a contrasting white pattern; the pattern is cinnamon in the wedge-tailed hillstar, and the tail is entirely dark in the black-breasted hillstar. The female is duller, with a whitish throat densely spotted with green, white, buff, or cinnamon underparts, and a dark tail with a white pattern.

== Behaviour ==
These highly territorial hummingbirds are found in temperate and alpine grassland, scrub and woodland at altitudes of 1,200 to 5,200 metres (3,900 to 17,100 ft). The Ecuadorian hillstar has been observed nesting at high altitudes on the cliffs of Cotopaxi. This species is known to nest colonially.

Many hillstars feed mainly on shrubs of the Andean plant genus Chuquiraga, and some species may be limited to them.

The genus has undergone allopatric speciation.
