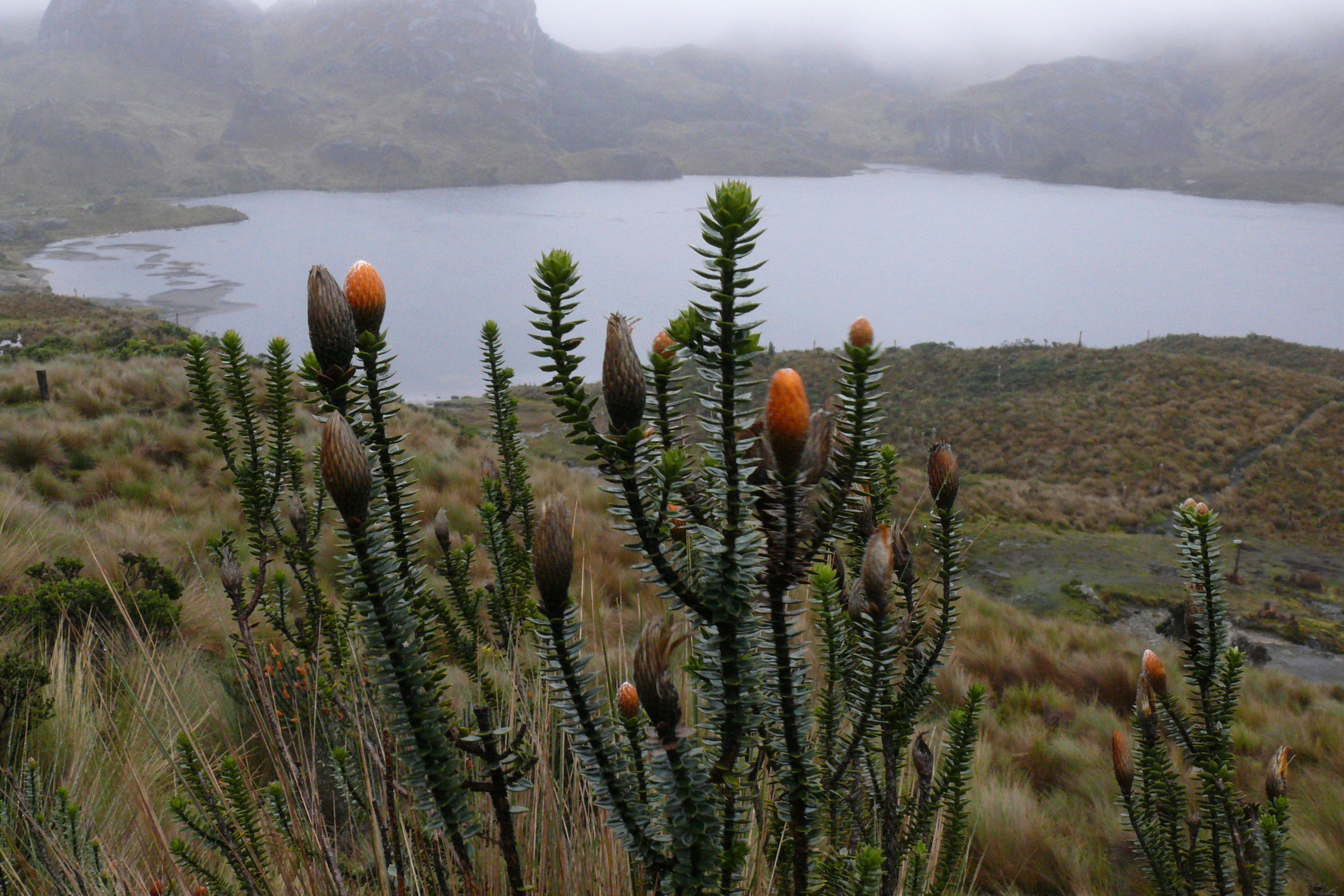

Scientific classification
- Kingdom: Plantae
- Clade: Tracheophytes
- Clade: Angiosperms
- Clade: Eudicots
- Clade: Asterids
- Order: Asterales
- Family: Asteraceae
- Genus: Chuquiraga
- Species: C. jussieui

Binomial name
- Chuquiraga jussieui J.F.Gmel.

Synonyms
- Chuquiraga insignis (Willd.) Bonpl.; Chuquiraga lancifolia Bonpl.; Chuquiraga microphylla Bonpl.; Chuquiraga peruviana J.St.-Hil.; Chuquiraga pseudoruscifolia Muschl.; Johannia insignis Willd.; Lychnophora van-isschoti Heckel

= Chuquiraga jussieui =

Species of plant

Chuquiraga jussieui, the flower of the Andes, is a species of flowering plant in the family Asteraceae. It is a low shrub, reaching a height of about 75 cm.

Chuquiraga jussieui is an endangered species. Its flowers are pale yellow or orange. It is native to Ecuador and Peru, and grows at 3000 to 5000 meters above sea level. Additionally, it contains bioactive components with medicinal properties. The hummingbird Oreotrochilus chimborazo feeds on the nectar.

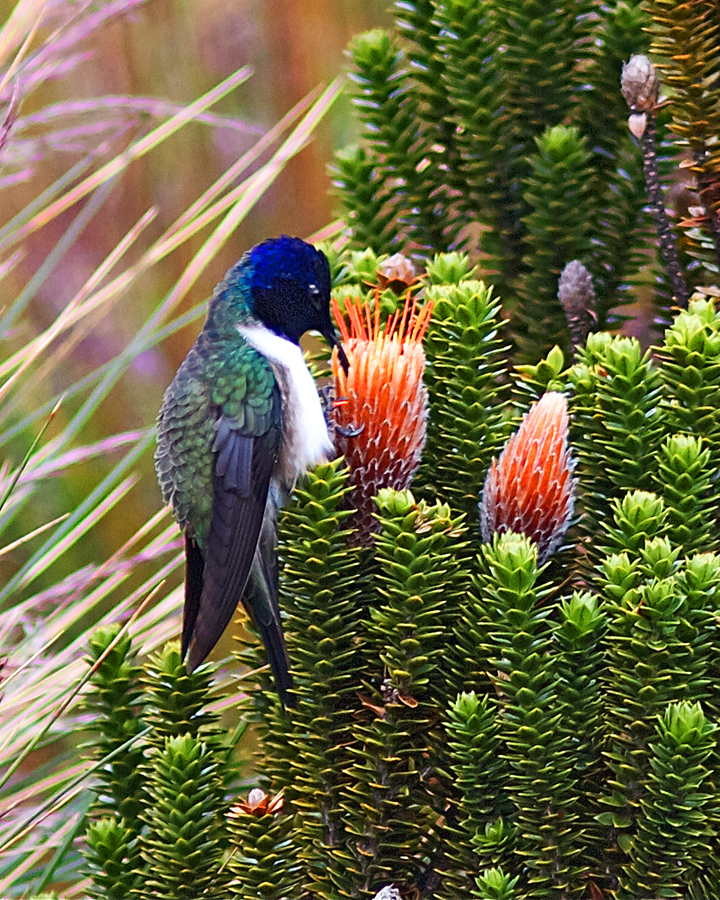
Male Oreotrochilus chimborazo feeding on C. jussieui

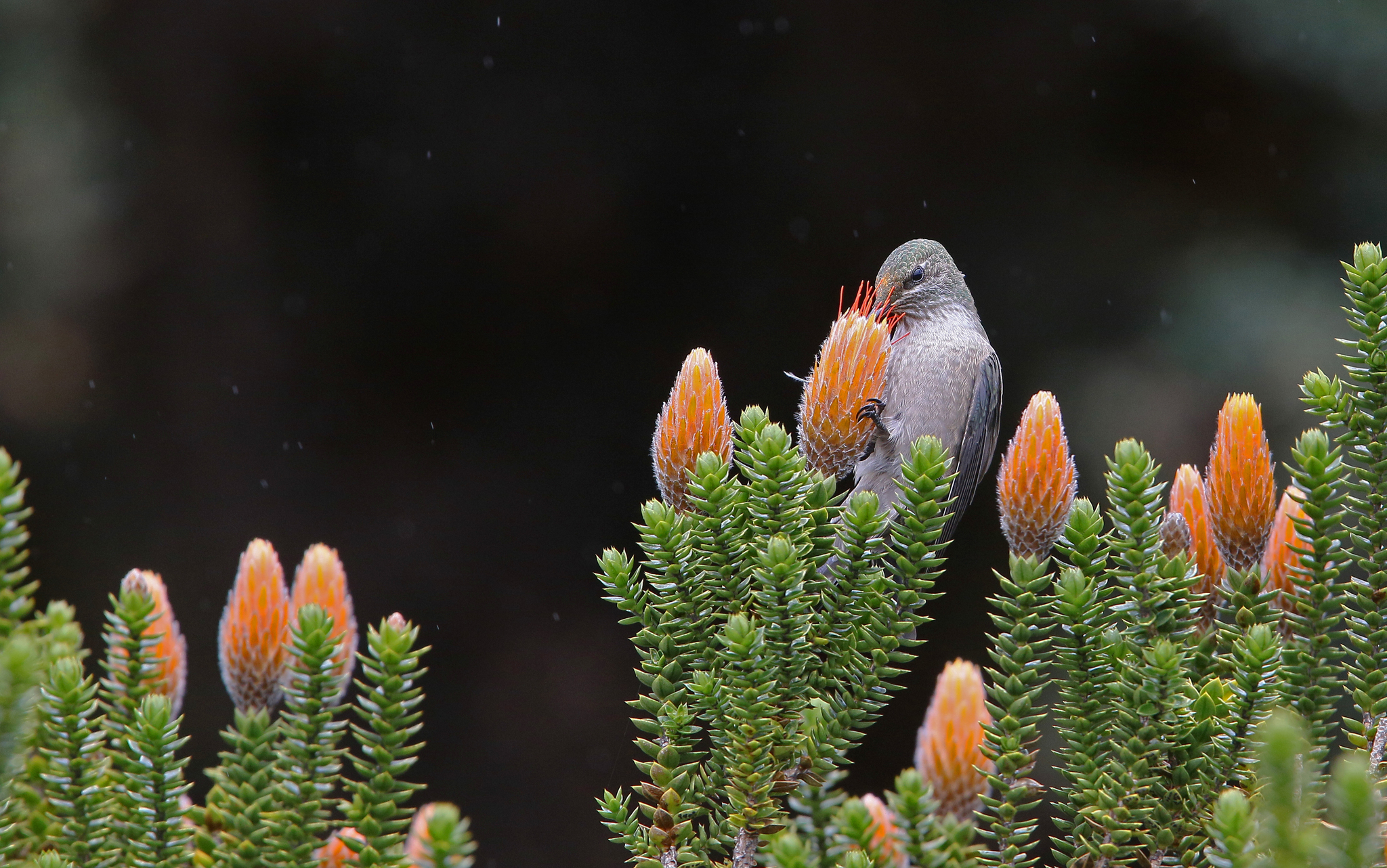
Female O. chimborazo feeding on C. jussieui
