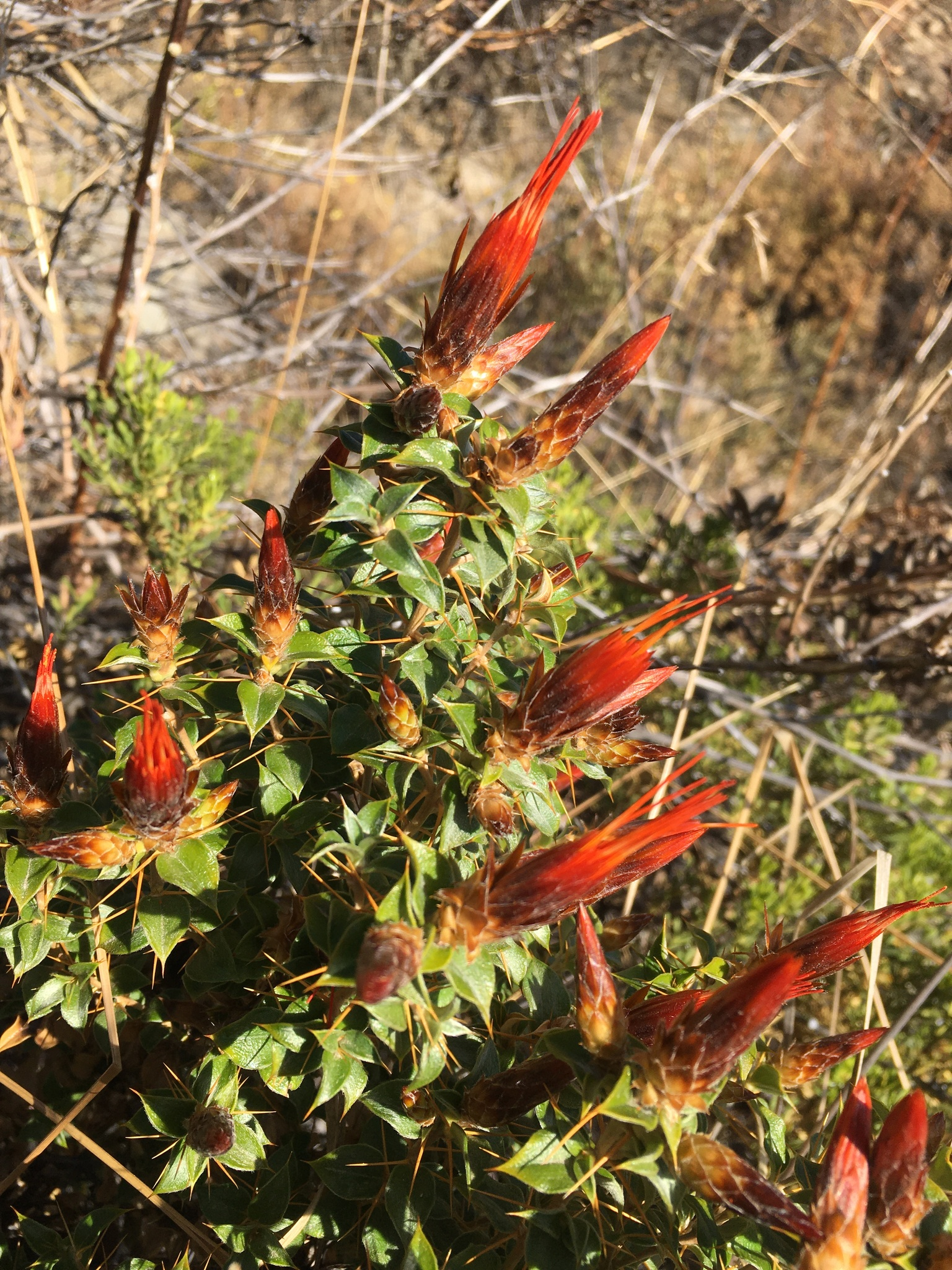

Scientific classification
- Kingdom: Plantae
- Clade: Tracheophytes
- Clade: Angiosperms
- Clade: Eudicots
- Clade: Asterids
- Order: Asterales
- Family: Asteraceae
- Genus: Chuquiraga
- Species: C. spinosa

Binomial name
- Chuquiraga spinosa Less.

Synonyms
- Chuquiraga rotundifolia Wedd.; Chuquiraga spinosa var. spinosa; Chuquiraga spinosa subsp. spinosa

= Chuquiraga spinosa =

Flowering plant native to Peru and Bolivia

Chuquiraga spinosa, common name huamanpinta in Spanish, is a species of flowering plant of the family Asteraceae. Native to Peru and Bolivia, it is used in traditional medicine for its anti-inflammatory properties.

== Taxonomy ==
Chuquiraga spinosa was described by Christian Friedrich Lessing and published in Linnaea 5: 259, in 1830.

== Economic and cultural importance ==
It is used in traditional medicine in Peru as a cleanser, a diuretic, and to treat kidney, liver, and prostate inflammation.

=== Secondary metabolites ===
The presence of phenolic acids, flavonoids, saponins, alkaloids, tannins, and steroids has been identified in the ethanolic extract of the aerial parts of the plant.

=== Scientific studies ===
In vitro studies in 2005 in Lima have determined the antioxidant properties of 53 ethanolic extracts of 40 plants used in traditional Peruvian medicine from different parts of the plants (root, flowers, stems, leaves, bark). The antioxidant activity of 21 of the extracts was demonstrated, including that of C. spinosa. The antioxidant and anti-inflammatory properties of methanolic extract have been proven in 2010 in vivo studies. In other in vivo studies in 2017, the protective effect of the ethanolic extract was verified against prostate cancer induced with N-methyl-nitrosourea and in the DU145 cell line.
