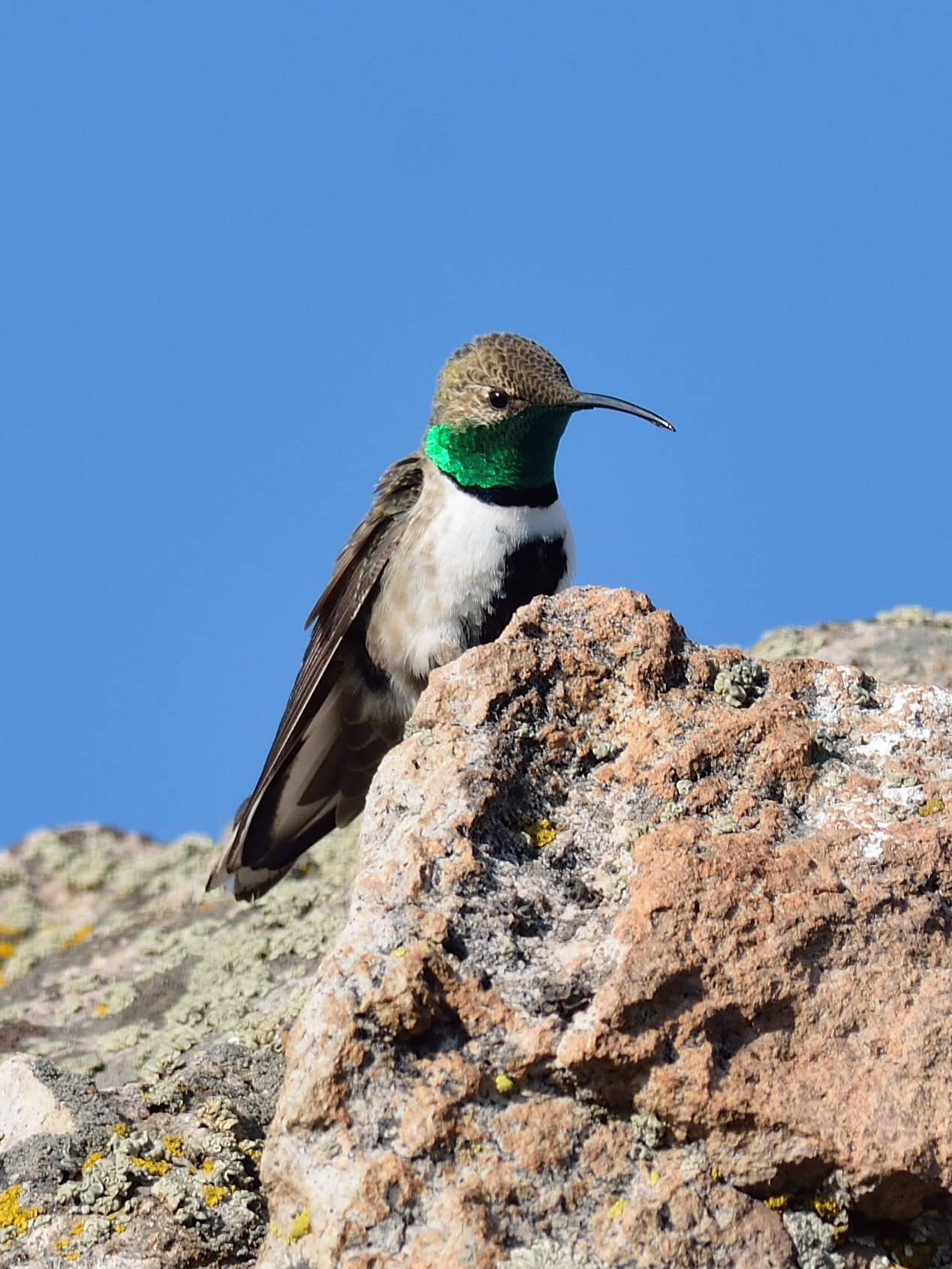

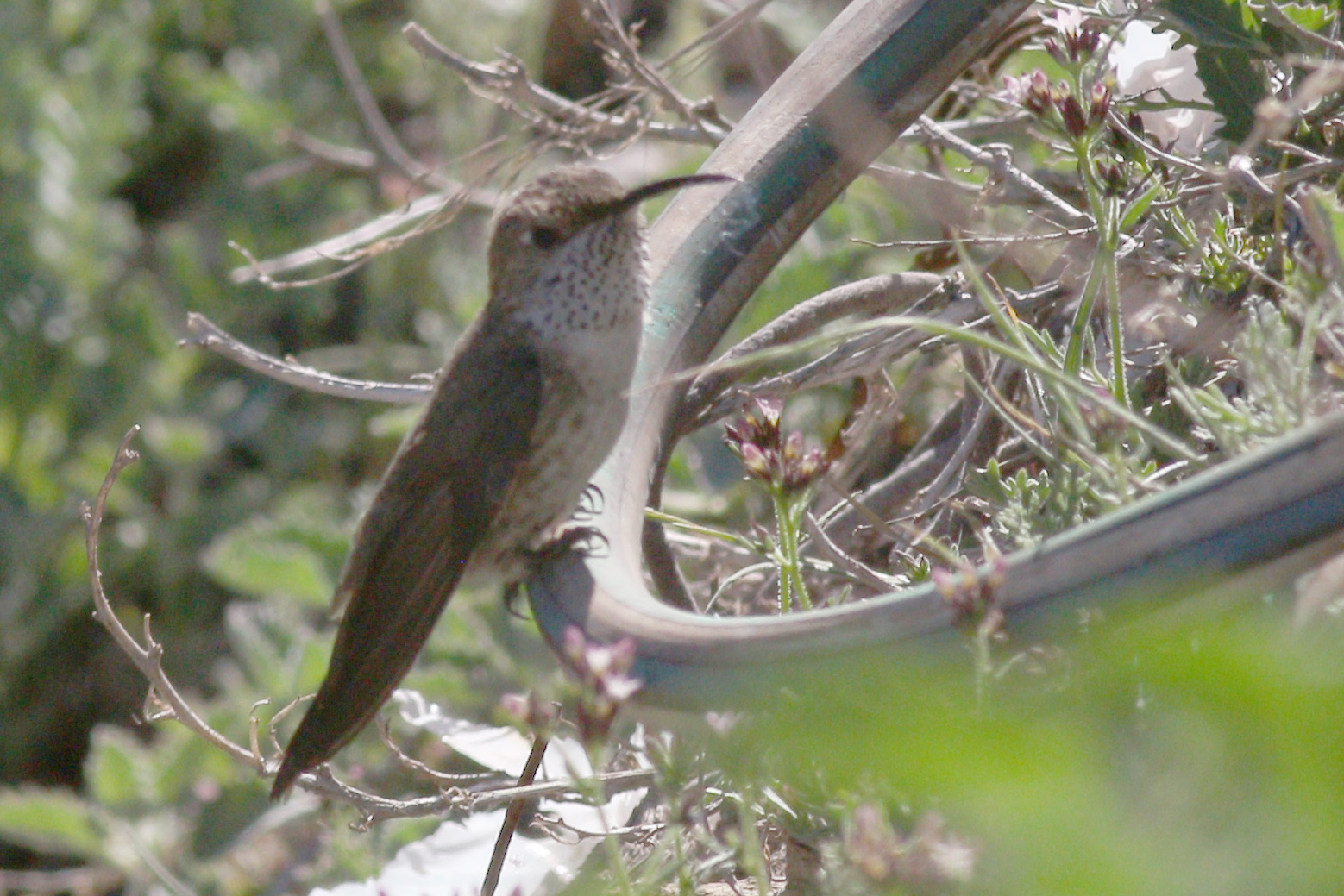
- Male above (Chile), female below (Argentina)

Conservation status
- Least Concern (IUCN 3.1)
- CITES Appendix II

Scientific classification
- Kingdom: Animalia
- Phylum: Chordata
- Class: Aves
- Order: Apodiformes
- Family: Trochilidae
- Genus: Oreotrochilus
- Species: O. leucopleurus

Binomial name
- Oreotrochilus leucopleurus Gould, 1847
- Distribution in South America (green)

= White-sided hillstar =

Species of hummingbird

The white-sided hillstar (Oreotrochilus leucopleurus) is a species of hummingbird in the "coquettes", tribe Lesbiini of subfamily Lesbiinae. It is found in Argentina, Bolivia, Chile.

== Taxonomy and systematics ==
The white-sided hillstar was at one time proposed to be a subspecies of Andean hillstar (Oreotrochilus estella) but major taxonomies retain it as a species. It is monotypic.

== Description ==
The white-sided hillstar is 13 to 15 cm (5.1 to 5.9 in) long and weighs 7.9 to 8.4 g (0.28 to 0.30 oz). Adults have a medium length slightly decurved black bill. The adult male has drab brown upperparts. It has a shiny green gorget with a black border that separates it from the white breast and belly. The belly has a wide blue-black stripe down its middle into the vent area. The somewhat rounded tail is bronzy black and its outer feathers have white at the base. The female is also dull brown above, and below as well. Its throat is pale with fine dark speckles. The tail is greenish black and the outer three or four pairs of feathers have much white at the bases and tips. The juvenile is overall more grayish than the adult and the male has a dark blue-green gorget.

== Distribution and habitat ==
The white-sided hillstar is found in the Andes from central Bolivia's Cochabamba Department south through Chile to the Biobío Region and Argentina as far south as Santa Cruz Province. It inhabits puna grasslands with dwarf shrubs, cacti, and Puya. In elevation it generally ranges from 1,200 to 4,000 m (3,900 to 13,100 ft) but may go higher even to the snow line.

== Behavior ==
=== Movement ===
The white-sided hillstar mostly leaves Chile during the Austral winter but some individuals simply move to lower elevations. There might also be some late winter or early spring movement further north than Cochabamba in Bolivia.

=== Feeding ===
The diet and feeding strategy of the white-sided hillstar are not well known but are believed to be similar to those of the closely related Andean hillstar. That species feeds on nectar at a variety of flowering shrubs, cacti, and trees, and perches to feed rather than hovering. It also gleans arthropods from vegetation and sometimes catches them on the wing.

=== Breeding ===
The white-sided hillstar breeds in November and December. It glues its large cup nest to a vertical rock face in a well-protected spot. The clutch size is two eggs. Little else is known about the species' breeding phenology.

=== Vocalization ===
The white-sided hillstar's vocalizations are not well known. It does make "a repeated short 'tsit'" call and also "a fast twittering during chasing or display".

== Status ==
The IUCN has assessed the white-sided hillstar as being of Least Concern. Though its population size is unknown, it is believed to be stable. It is generally common and occurs in several protected areas. Its core habitat is under only slight human pressure.
