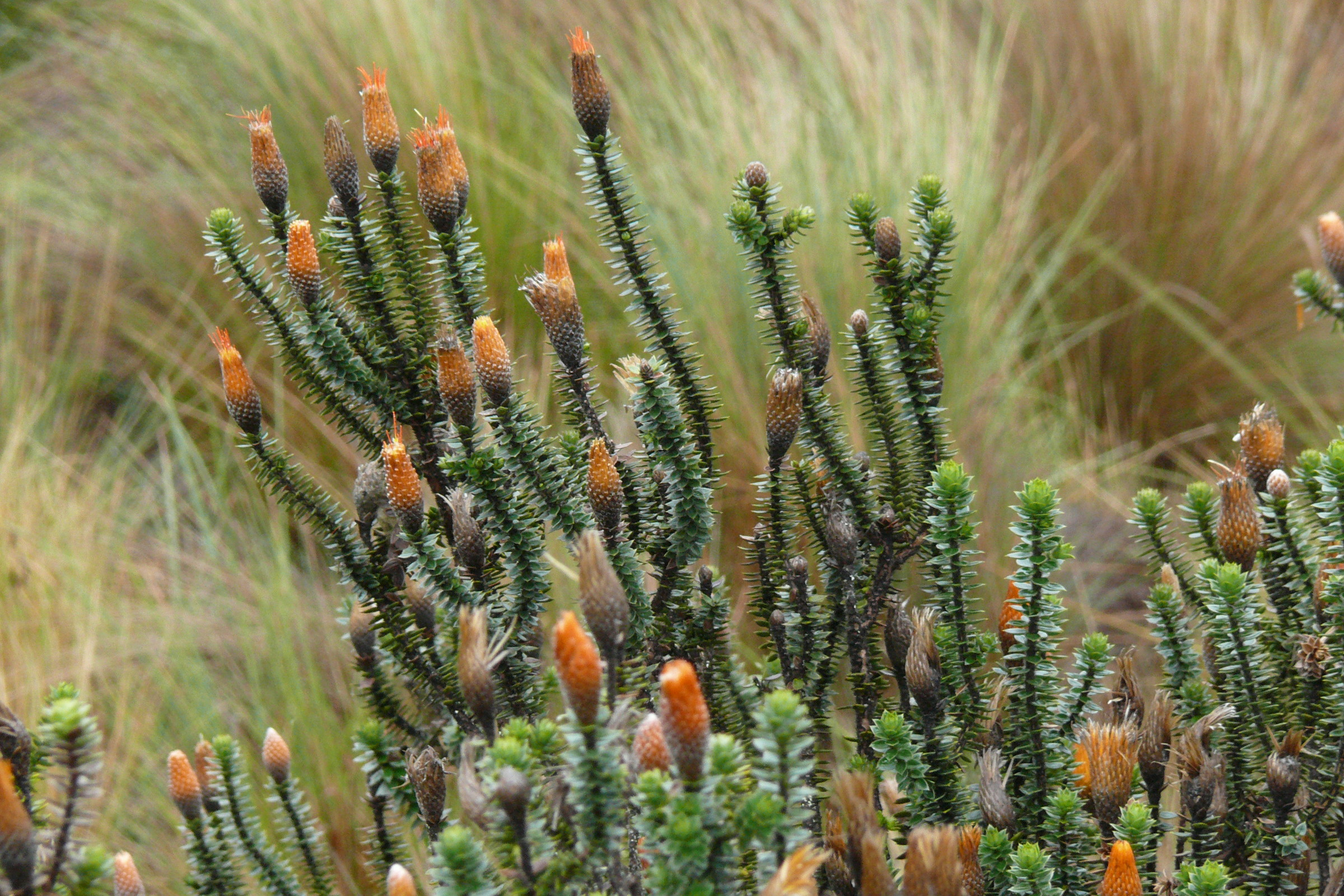
- Chuquiraga jussieui

Scientific classification
- Kingdom: Plantae
- Clade: Embryophytes
- Clade: Tracheophytes
- Clade: Spermatophytes
- Clade: Angiosperms
- Clade: Eudicots
- Clade: Asterids
- Order: Asterales
- Family: Asteraceae
- Subfamily: Barnadesioideae
- Tribe: Barnadesieae
- Genus: Chuquiraga; Juss.

Synonyms
- Joannesia Pers. 1807, illegitimate homonym not Vell. 1789 (Euphorbiaceae); Joannea Willd. ex Spreng.; Diacantha Lag.; Johannia Willd.

= Chuquiraga =

Genus of flowering plants

Chuquiraga is a genus of flowering plants in the family Asteraceae. The genus is distributed in the Andes from Colombia to Chile, with most species occurring in Patagonia.

These are evergreen shrubs. They have many shapes and sizes of leaves, and two general types of flowers apparently adapted for pollination by hummingbirds and insects. Some species occur at elevations over 4000 meters in the Andes, while others can be found at sea level.

Many are of ecological importance because they are dominant plant species in very dry habitat types, and local animals depend on them. Hummingbirds of the genus Oreotrochilus, the hillstars, rely heavily on these plants, and some species have never been observed on any other plant taxa.

Some species have been used as fuel, as traditional medicines, and as ornamental plants.

Species

- Chuquiraga acanthophylla
- Chuquiraga arcuata
- Chuquiraga atacamensis
- Chuquiraga aurea
- Chuquiraga avellanedae
- Chuquiraga calchaquina
- Chuquiraga doniana
- Chuquiraga echegarayi
- Chuquiraga jussieui
- Chuquiraga kuscheli
- Chuquiraga kuschelii
- Chuquiraga longiflora
- Chuquiraga morenonis
- Chuquiraga oblongifolia
- Chuquiraga oppositifolia
- Chuquiraga parviflora
- Chuquiraga raimondiana
- Chuquiraga rosulata
- Chuquiraga ruscifolia
- Chuquiraga spinosa
- Chuquiraga straminea
- Chuquiraga tomentosa
- Chuquiraga weberbaueri
