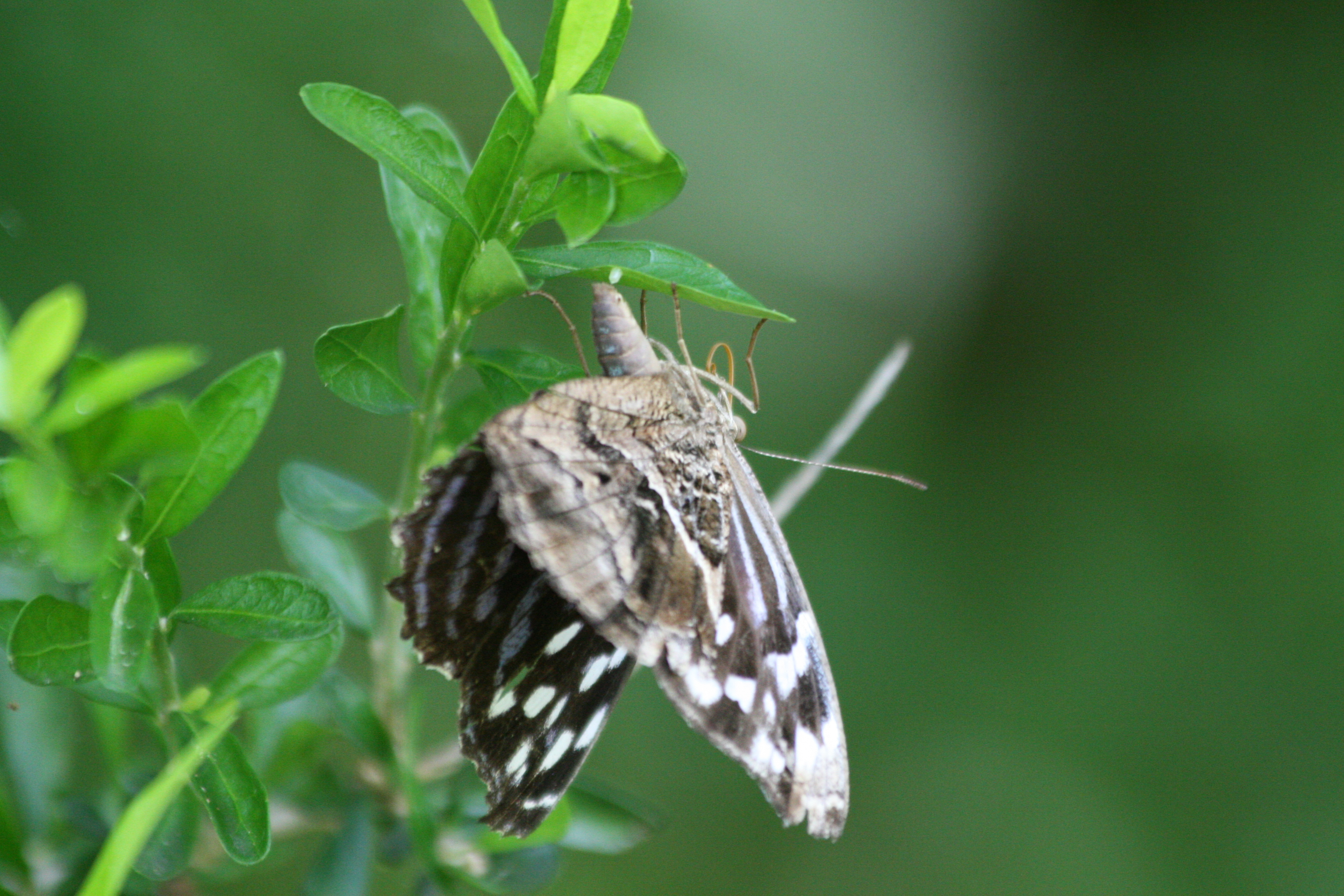
- A. vaseyi with ovipositing Myscelia ethusa

Scientific classification
- Kingdom: Plantae
- Clade: Tracheophytes
- Clade: Angiosperms
- Clade: Eudicots
- Clade: Rosids
- Order: Malpighiales
- Family: Euphorbiaceae
- Subfamily: Acalyphoideae
- Tribe: Adelieae
- Genus: Adelia; L. 1759, conserved name, not P.Browne 1756 (Oleaceae)

Synonyms
- Ricinella Müll.Arg.

= Adelia =

Genus of flowering plants

Adelia is a genus of flowering plants in the spurge family, Euphorbiaceae, subfamily Acalyphoideae. It is native to Latin America and the Caribbean, with one species extending northward into the southernmost part of Texas.

The name is derived from the Greek words α (a), meaning "not", and δήλος (delos), meaning "visible." It refers to the difficulties Linnaeus experienced interpreting the genus.

== Species ==
Current species include

1. Adelia barbinervis Cham. & Schltdl. – hairynerve adelia - Mexico, N Central America
2. Adelia brandegeei V.W.Steinm. - Baja California Sur, Sonora
3. Adelia cinerea (Wiggins & Robbins) A.Cerv., V.W.Steinm. & Flores-Olvera - Sonora
4. Adelia membranifolia (Müll.Arg.) Chodat & Hassl. - Brazil, Bolivia, Paraguay, NE Argentina
5. Adelia oaxacana (Müll.Arg.) Hemsl. – Oaxaca Adelia - most of Mexico from San Luis Potosí + Sinaloa to Chiapas + Quintana Roo
6. Adelia obovata Wiggins & Robbins - Sonora, Sinaloa
7. Adelia panamensis Pax & K.Hoffm. - Panama
8. Adelia ricinella L. – Wild Lime - West Indies, Venezuela, Colombia
9. Adelia triloba (Müll.Arg.) Hemsl. – threelobe adelia - Central America, Colombia, Ecuador, Venezuela
10. Adelia vaseyi (Coult.) Pax & K.Hoffmann – Vasey's wild lime - Tamaulipas, S Texas (Starr, Hidalgo, Cameron, + Willacy Counties)

Formerly included species (including in Oleaceae homonym) moved to other genera, including
(Alchornea, Bernardia, Doryxylon, Erythrococca, Flueggea, Forestiera (Oleaceae), Garciadelia, Homonoia, Lasiocroton, Macaranga, Mallotus, and Spathiostemon )

1. A. acidoton L. 1759 not Blanco 1837 - Flueggea acidoton
2. A. acidoton Blanco 1837 not L. 1759 - Doryxylon spinosum
3. A. acuminata - Forestiera acuminata
4. A. angustifolia - Forestiera angustifolia
5. A. anomala - Erythrococca anomala
6. A. barbata - Mallotus mollissimus
7. A. bernardia Blanco 1837 not L. 1759 - Mallotus mollissimus
8. A. bernardia L. 1759 not Blanco 1837- Bernardia dichotoma
9. A. caperoniifolia - Bernardia caperoniifolia
10. A. cassinoides - Forestiera segregata
11. A. castanocarpa - Chaetocarpus castanocarpus
12. A. celastrinea - Bernardia celastrinea
13. A. cordifolia - Macaranga cordifolia
14. A. cuneata - Homonoia retusa
15. A. dodecandra - Bernardia dodecandra
16. A. ferruginea - Garciadelia leprosa
17. A. glandulosa - Alchornea rugosa
18. A. globularis - Forestiera segregata
19. A. gracilis - Flueggea acidoton
20. A. hirsutissima - Bernardia hirsutissima
21. A. houlletiana - Bernardia axillaris subsp. houlletiana
22. A. javanica - Spathiostemon javensis
23. A. leprosa - Garciadelia leprosa
24. A. ligustrina - Forestiera ligustrina
25. A. martii - Bernardia axillaris
26. A. microphylla - Lasiocroton microphyllus
27. A. monoica - Melanolepis multiglandulosa
28. A. neomexicana - Forestiera pubescens var. parvifolia
29. A. neriifolia - Homonoia riparia
30. A. ovata - Forestiera acuminata
31. A. papillaris - Mallotus tiliifolius
32. A. parvifolia - Forestiera pubescens
33. A. phillyreoides - Forestiera phillyreoides
34. A. pinetorum - Forestiera segregata var. pinetorum
35. A. porulosa - Forestiera segregata
36. A. pubescens - Forestiera pubescens
37. A. pulchella - Bernardia pulchella
38. A. resinosa - Mallotus resinosus
39. A. reticulata - Forestiera reticulata
40. A. retusa - Homonoia retusa
41. A. rhamnifolia - Forestiera rhamnifolia
42. A. rotundifolia - Forestiera rotundifolia
43. A. scabrida - Bernardia axillaris subsp. scabrida
44. A. segregata - Forestiera segregata
45. A. spartioides - Bernardia spartioides
46. A. sphaerocarpa - Forestiera pubescens var. parvifolia
47. A. tamanduana - Bernardia tamanduana
48. A. tenuifolia - Bernardia tenuifolia
49. A. virgata Poir. 1810 not Brandegee 1894 - Flueggea tinctoria
