= A. barbinervis =

A. barbinervis may refer to:

- Acacia barbinervis, a shrub species
- Adelia barbinervis, a flowering plant species
