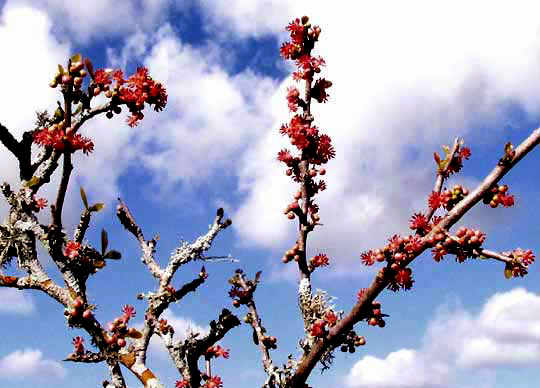
- Enriquebeltrania crenatifolia branches with male flowers

Scientific classification
- Kingdom: Plantae
- Clade: Embryophytes
- Clade: Tracheophytes
- Clade: Angiosperms
- Clade: Eudicots
- Clade: Rosids
- Order: Malpighiales
- Family: Euphorbiaceae
- Tribe: Adelieae
- Genus: Enriquebeltrania
- Species: E. crenatifolia

Binomial name
- Enriquebeltrania crenatifolia (Miranda) Rzed.

Synonyms
- Beltrania crenatifolia Miranda

= Enriquebeltrania crenatifolia =

Species of plant

Enriquebeltrania crenatifolia, with no commonly used English name, is a species of shrub native only to Mexico. It belongs to the Spurge or Euphorbia Family, the Euphorbiaceae.

== Discription ==
Here are important field marks for recognizing Enriquebeltrania crenatifolia:

- It is a shrub up to 2 m (6 ft 7 in) tall with thick, whitish branches, the younger ones somewhat reddish, hairy and a little flexible. Smaller side-branches often are sharply tipped and spine-like.
- Leaves arise single along branches, though often they cluster together. Stipules up to 2 mm (1/8 in) long persist at petiole bases. Petioles up to 4 mm (1/8 in) bear blades widest above their middles and up to 4.5 cm (1 3/4 in) long and 2.5 cm (1 in) wide. Blade margins are to various degrees scalloped, or crenate, at least at their outer end. Blade's lower surfaces bear several obscure, translucent glandular dots.
- Individual trees bear only male or only female flowers (dioecious). Male flowers contain up to 30 stamens and develop from spherical buds. Flowers are clustered, on pedicel up to 3 mm (1/8 in) long. Female flowers are not described in the literature but an image on this page shows one.
- Fruits are nearly spherical capsules displaying 4 ribs running lengthwise. Mature capsules split into two parts, each with a suture which splits to release one of the capsule's two seeds. Seeds are somewhat spherical with one flattish face, and up to 5 mm (1/4 in) in diameter.

== Distribution ==
Enriquebeltrania crenatifolia is endemic just to Mexico's northern Yucatan Peninsula, in the states of Campeche, Quintana Roo and Yucatán.

== Habitat ==
Enriquebeltrania crenatifolia occurs in low-growing, tropical forests with deciduous leaves, and among coastal dunes. Images on this page are from individuals in very thin soil atop limestone, along the coast at the edge of a mangrove swamp where during the rainy season the area must be flooded.

== Uses by humans ==
=== As bonsai plants ===
Enriquebeltrania crenatifolia plants are sold by nurseries specializing in the culture of potted bonsai plants. A desirable feature of the species is its production of red male flowers.

=== As firewood ===
Despite the rare occurrence of Enriquebeltrania crenatifolia, Mayan people of the Yucatan Peninsula are documented as using the tree for firewood.

== Taxonomy ==
In 1957 when Mexican botanist Faustino Miranda formally described Enriquebeltrania crenatifolia under the basionym Beltrania crenatifolia, he also erected the monotypic genus Beltrania. In 1979 that genus name was demoted to the status of a synonym for the newly erected genus Enriquebeltrania. The reason for the demotion was that the genus Beltrania previously had been created to accommodate an ascomycete fungus.

=== Phylogeny ===
Before 2006, Beltrania crenatifolia was considered to be the only species of the monotypic genus Beltrania, with the species exhibiting a disjunct distribution with one population in the Yucatan Peninsula and the other across Mexico along the Pacific coast in the states of Jalisco and Sinaloa. In 2006, based on morphological and molecular analysis, it was determined that the Pacific coast population represented a second species, Enriquebeltrania disjuncta.

=== Etymology ===
The genus name Enriquebeltrania honors the Mexican biologist Enrique Beltrán.

In the species name crenatifolia, the crenati- is from the Latin crenate, meaning "scalloped or obtusely rounded", while -folia is from the Late Latin folium meaning "leaf." The resulting "scalloped leaf" well describes leaf margins of Beltrania crenatifolia.

== Gallery ==
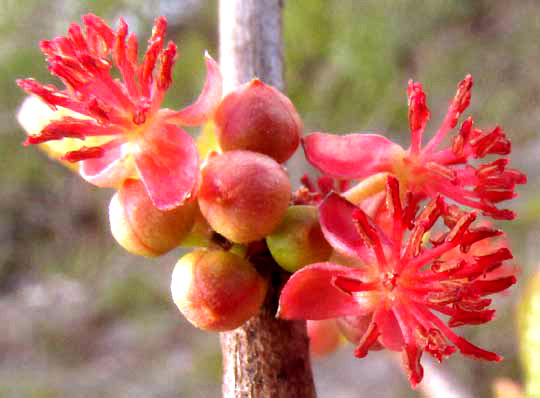
male flowers among unopened flower buds

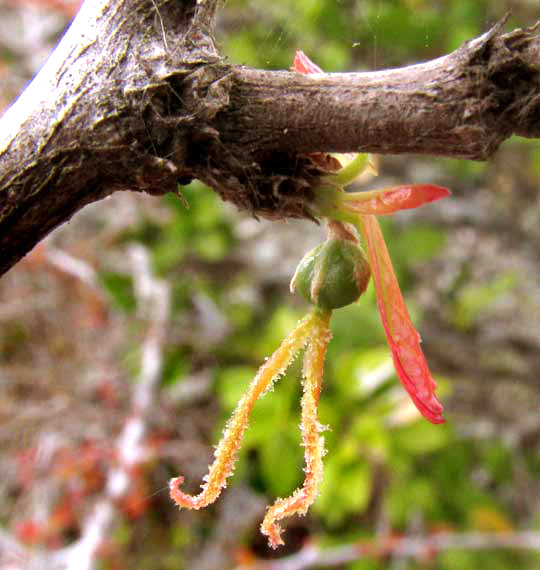
female flower with emerging leaves

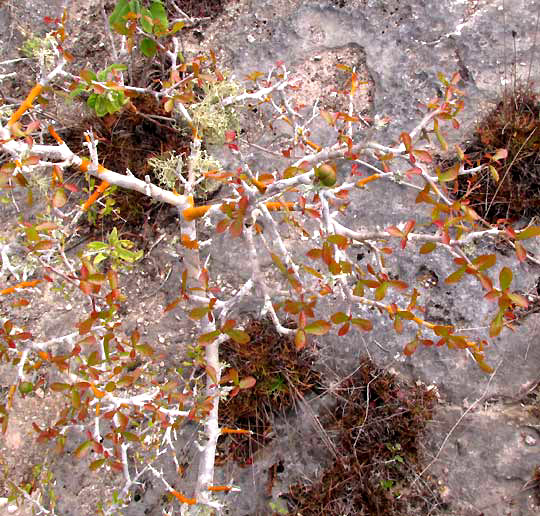
one fruit among branches with emerging leaves

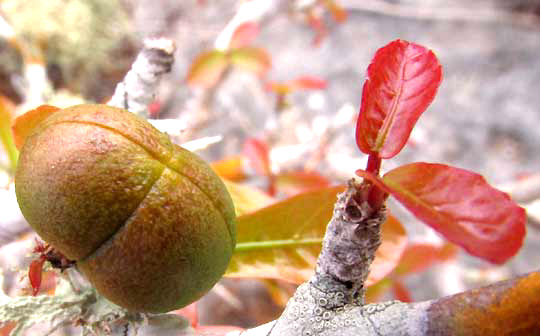
immature fruit beside young leaves

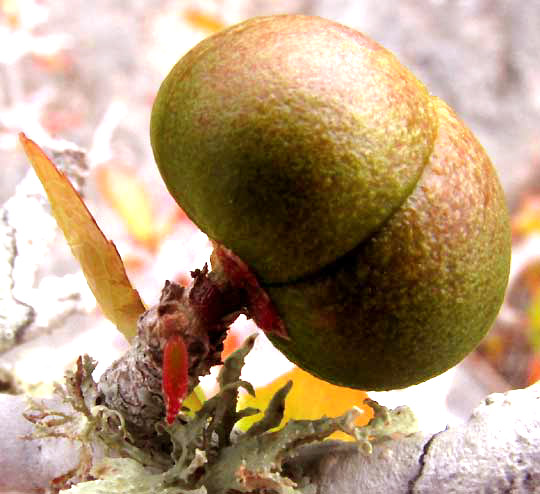
fruit with stipe

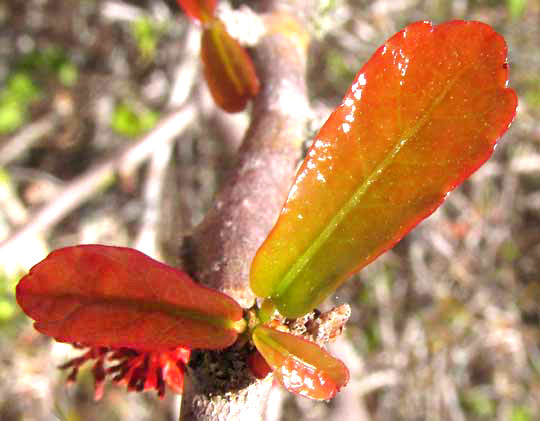
young leaves

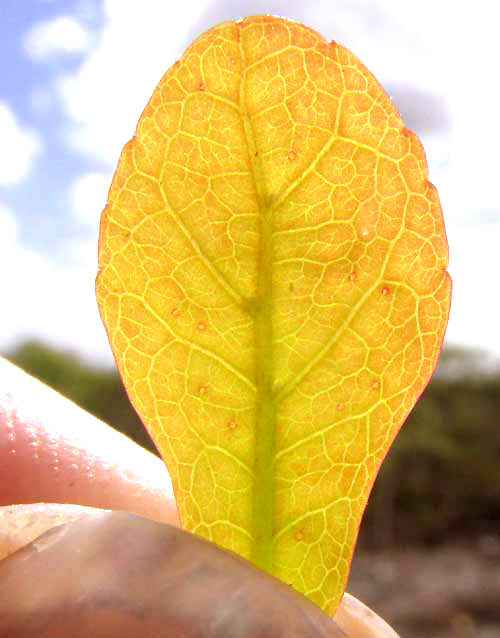
scattered transluscent glands

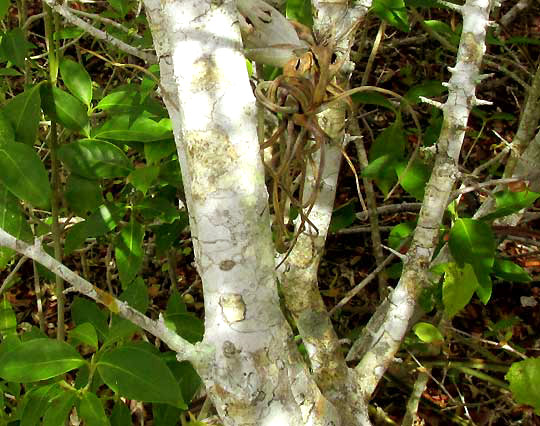
whitish trunk with spinescent branches
