= Bigelovia =

Bigelovia may refer to two different genera of plants:

- Bigelovia Sm., a taxonomic synonym for Forestiera
- Bigelovia Spreng, a taxonomic synonym for Spermacoce
