= Forestiera phillyreoides =

- leafy stem with fruits

Conservation status
- Least Concern (IUCN 3.1)

Scientific classification
- Kingdom: Plantae
- Clade: Tracheophytes
- Clade: Angiosperms
- Clade: Eudicots
- Clade: Asterids
- Order: Lamiales
- Family: Oleaceae
- Genus: Forestiera
- Species: F. phillyreoides

Binomial name
- Forestiera phillyreoides (Benth.) Torr.

Synonyms
- Adelia phillyreoides (Benth.) Kuntze; Forestiera porulosa var. phillyreoides (Benth.) A.Gray; Piptolepis phillyreoides Benth.; Forestiera phillyreoides var. spathulifolia Torr.

Species of flowering plant

Drupe-type fruit cut to expose single seed

Flowering branch

Flowers with black anthers

Leafy stem

Tree in hillside habitat

Forestiera phillyreoides, with no commonly used English name, though sometimes it shares the name desert olive with other species, is a shrub or small tree native to Mexico and adjacent United States. It belongs to the family Oleaceae.

== Description ==
Key features distinguishing Forestiera phillyreoides from similar species:

- It is a shrub or small tree usually branched at the base, up to 6 m (20 ft) tall, and with trunks up to 20 cm (8 in) in diameter. Its bark is smooth and gray to blackish. Its leaves are not regularly deciduous, but are shed when it is advantageous to do so because of environmental conditions.
- Leaves arising opposite one another with very short petioles typically are up to 2.5 cm (1 in) long and 1.6 cm (5/8 in) wide, though they can be nearly twice that size. Leathery to papery blades bear no teeth, lobes or indentations, but their margins may be somewhat turned under. Surfaces can be densely hairy to hairless, and the upper surface is darker than the lower. The upper surface does not exhibit a network of interconnecting veins between the secondary veins.
- Inflorescences of 3-7 flowers form clusters only up to 10 mm (3/8 in) long. Flower pedicels are up to 5 mm (3/16 in) long, growing longer in fruit. Individual flowers bear both male and female parts, though they produce no calyces or corollas, except sometimes much reduced, irregular sepals develop. Each flower has 3-5 stamens with filaments up to about 5 mm (3/16 in) long tipped with small, black or blackish anthers. The ovary has a style about half as long as the stamens. In Mexico, flowering may occur throughout the year but in the US flowers commonly appear from December through March.
- Fruits are drupes which when mature turn dark blue or black; they are somewhat sickle-shaped, or falcate. Reaching up to 11 mm (7/16 in) long, they bear 1 or rarely two seeds about half as long as the fruit.

== Distribution ==
In Mexico, Forestiera phillyreoides occurs throughout the uplands north of the Isthmus of Tehuantepec, but is missing in the northeastern states and the Yucatan Peninsula. In the USA it occurs in southern and southwestern parts of the state of Arizona.

== Habitat ==
In the US, Forestiera phillyreoides inhabits desert mountains. In highland central Mexico it occurs in dry scrub, tropical deciduous forests with long dry seasons, and certan adjacent forests with oak and pine, as well as sometimes in disturbed, weedy areas, at elevations of 1,700 to 2,400 m (5,600 to 7,900 ft) above sea level.

== Fruits eaten by wildlife ==
Fruits of Forestiera phillyreoides appear to be taken readily by bords; droppings near bushes and trees sometimes are composed almost entirely of Forestiera fruits. In Mexico, fruits may appear throughout the year.

== Uses by humans ==
=== In landscaping ===
Forestiera phillyreoides is appropriate for planting in urban forests and parks, and for forming barriers and hedgerows.

=== Potential for reforestation ===
Because of the presence of Forestiera phillyreoides in various kinds of vegetation types and its clear ability to adapt to various conditions of climate and soil, the species is judged as a viable option for reforestation. After 7 months in a nursery, the plants reach up to 30 cm (12 in) in height, appropriate for establishment in the field.

== Taxonomy ==
In 1840 when George Bentham formally described Forestiera phillyreoides, using the basionym Piptolepis phillyreoides, at the same time he erected the genus Piptolepis; this later was recognized as a synonym of the genus Forestiera. Bentham had noted the genus's similarity to Forestiera. He also wrote that his new taxon inhabited the Mexican state of Guanajuato.

Forestiera phillyreoides is one of numerous taxa first collected scientifically by Karl Theodor Hartweg. As Bentham explains in the preface of his work, Hartweg had been engaged as a collector by the Horticultural Society of London, now known as the Royal Horticultural Society and was sent to Mexico at the close of 1836. While collecting seeds, roots and plants for the Society, he was permitted to furnish on his own account dried specimens for those who subscribed to them through the Society. This was how Bentham gained access to material which became his type specimen for the taxon.

=== Phylogeny ===
As of 2026, molecular phylogenetic analysis dealing with Forestiera phillyreoides had not been published. However, the 1977 revision of Forestiera mostly based on morphology and flowering periods suggested that Forestiera phillyreoides most closely is related to Forestiera angustifolia and Forestiera segregata. A 2021 study based on wood anatomy of Mexico's Forestiera species found that Forestiera phillyreoides shared several characters with Forestiera angustifolia and Forestiera durangensis, the first two species being most similar.

=== Etymology ===
The genus name Forestiera honors Robert André Forestier, a physician who was friendly with botanist Jean Louis Marie Poiret, who named the genus.

The species name phillyreoides is constructed of the Greek phillyrea, meaning "leafy," and the Greek -oides, for "similar to." Thus "resembling the genus Phillyrea, a genus of similar species, also belonging to the olive family.
