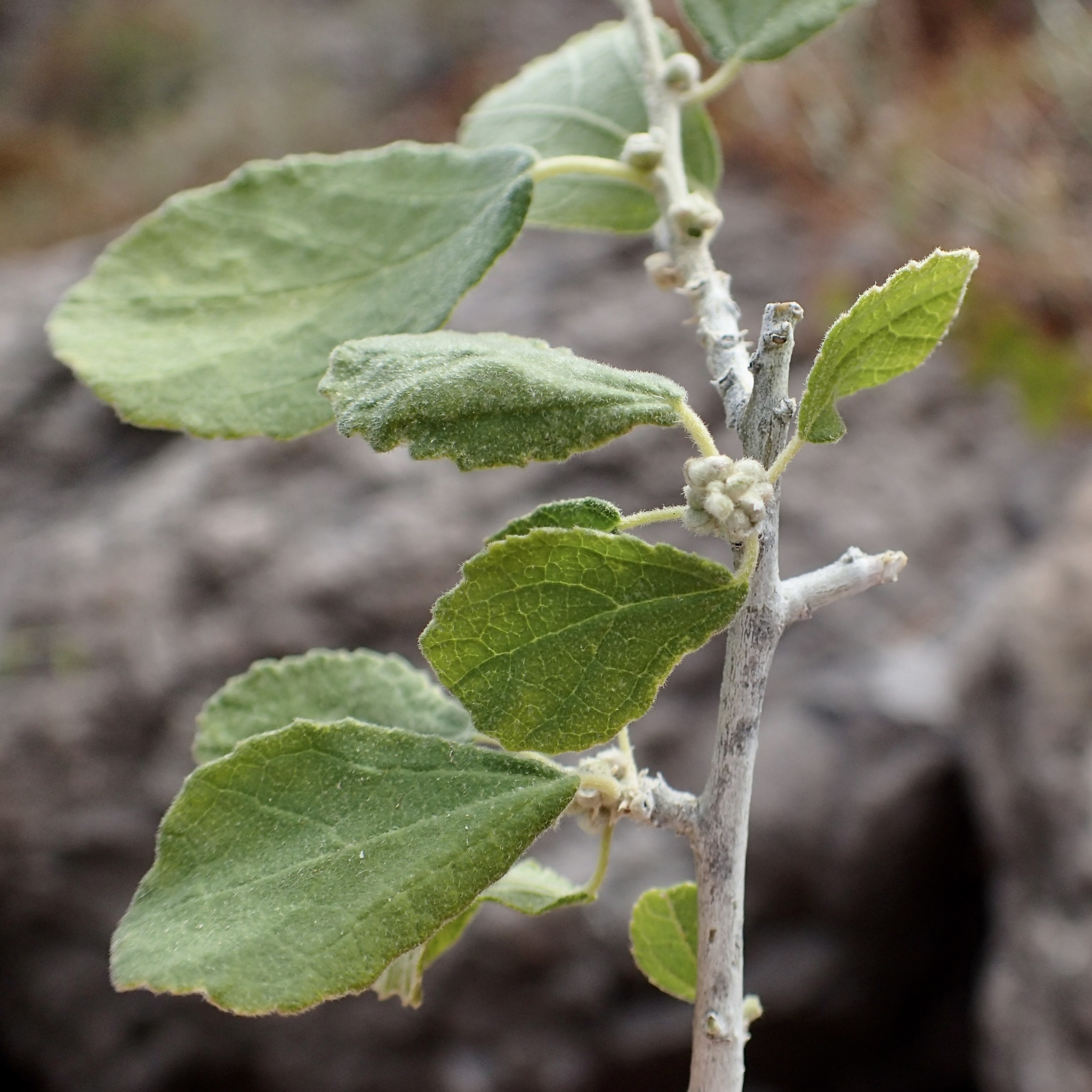
- Bernardia viridis

Scientific classification
- Kingdom: Plantae
- Clade: Tracheophytes
- Clade: Angiosperms
- Clade: Eudicots
- Clade: Rosids
- Order: Malpighiales
- Family: Euphorbiaceae
- Subfamily: Acalyphoideae
- Tribe: Bernardieae
- Genus: Bernardia; Houst. ex Mill. 1754 not Adans. 1763

Synonyms
- Alevia Baill.; Bernhardia Post & Kuntze, orth. var.; Bivonia Spreng.; Passaea Baill.; Phaedra Klotzsch ex Endl.; Polyboea Klotzsch ex Endl.; Traganthus Klotzsch; Tyria Klotzsch ex Endl.

= Bernardia =

Genus of flowering plants

Bernardia is a plant genus of the family Euphorbiaceae first described for modern science as a genus in 1754. It is native to North and South America, as well as the West Indies.

Species

1. Bernardia alarici – Rio Grande do Sul
2. Bernardia albida – S + E Mexico
3. Bernardia amazonica – S Venezuela
4. Bernardia argentinensis – N Argentina
5. Bernardia asplundii – Corrientes
6. Bernardia axillaris – SE Brazil
7. Bernardia brevipes – Rio de Janeiro
8. Bernardia caperoniifolia – Uruguay, Paraguay
9. Bernardia carpinifolia – Bahamas, Cayman Is, Jamaica, Cuba, Hispaniola
10. Bernardia celastrinea – Rio de Janeiro, São Paulo
11. Bernardia chiangii – Puebla, Oaxaca
12. Bernardia chiapensis – Chiapas
13. Bernardia chinantlensis – Veracruz, Oaxaca
14. Bernardia colombiana – Colombia
15. Bernardia confertifolia – S Brazil, Misiones
16. Bernardia corensis – Venezuela, West Indies
17. Bernardia crassifolia – Minas Gerais
18. Bernardia dichotoma – Venezuela, West Indies
19. Bernardia dodecandra – Mexico, Belize, Guatemala
20. Bernardia flexuosa – Rio Grande do Sul
21. Bernardia fonsecae A.Cerv. & J.Jiménez Ram. – Guerrero
22. Bernardia fruticulosa – Dominican Rep
23. Bernardia gambosa – E Brazil
24. Bernardia gardneri – Piauí, Goiás
25. Bernardia geniculata – Rio Grande do Sul
26. Bernardia gentryana – Mexico
27. Bernardia hagelundii – Rio Grande do Sul
28. Bernardia hassleriana – Paraguay
29. Bernardia heteropilosa – Puebla, Nayarit
30. Bernardia hirsutissima – Brazil
31. Bernardia jacquiniana – Colombia, Venezuela, Ecuador
32. Bernardia kochii – Jalisco
33. Bernardia lagunensis – Baja California
34. Bernardia lanceifolia – Chiapas
35. Bernardia laurentii – St. Lucia
36. Bernardia leptostachys – Paraguay
37. Bernardia longipedunculata – Paraguay
38. Bernardia macrocarpa – Veracruz, Puebla
39. Bernardia macrophylla – Panama, Costa Rica
40. Bernardia mayana – Guatemala
41. Bernardia mazatlana – Sinaloa
42. Bernardia mcvaughii – Jalisco
43. Bernardia mexicana – Mexico, Guatemala, Nicaragua, Venezuela
44. Bernardia micrantha – Rio de Janeiro
45. Bernardia mollis – Chiapas, Guatemala
46. Bernardia multicaulis – S Brazil, NE Argentina, Paraguay, Uruguay
47. Bernardia myricifolia – S California, S Nevada, Arizona, New Mexico, S Texas, N Mexico
48. Bernardia nicaraguensis – Chiapas, Central America
49. Bernardia oblanceolata – Oaxaca, Chiapas
50. Bernardia obovata – W Texas, S New Mexico, Coahuila, Chihuahua
51. Bernardia odonellii – Misiones
52. Bernardia ovalifolia – Durango
53. Bernardia ovata – Paraguay
54. Bernardia paraguariensis – Paraguay, Bolivia
55. Bernardia polymorpha – Paraguay, Brazil
56. Bernardia pooleae – Honduras
57. Bernardia pulchella – S Brazil, Misiones, Paraguay, Uruguay
58. Bernardia rzedowskii – Durango
59. Bernardia santanae – México State, Jalisco
60. Bernardia scabra – Rio de Janeiro
61. Bernardia sellowii – S Brazil, Entre Rios, Paraguay, Uruguay
62. Bernardia sidoides – Brazil, Guyana, Venezuela
63. Bernardia similis – Rio de Janeiro, São Paulo
64. Bernardia simplex – Paraguay
65. Bernardia spartioides – São Paulo, Goiás
66. Bernardia spongiosa – Colima, Jalisco
67. Bernardia tamanduana – Bahia, Rio de Janeiro
68. Bernardia tenuifolia – Hispaniola
69. Bernardia trelawniensis – Trelawny
70. Bernardia valdesii – Jalisco
71. Bernardia venezuelana – Venezuela
72. Bernardia viridis – Baja California Sur, Sonora, Chihuahua
73. Bernardia wilburii – Jalisco
74. Bernardia yucatanensis – Yucatán Peninsula, Guatemala

Formerly included

moved to other genera (Adelia, Adenophaedra, Garciadelia, Lasiocroton, Tetracoccus (Picrodendraceae))

1. B. cinerea – Adelia cinerea
2. B. denticulata – Adenophaedra grandifolia
3. B. fasciculata – Tetracoccus fasciculatus
4. B. grandifolia – Adenophaedra grandifolia
5. B. leprosa – Garciadelia leprosa
6. B. lycioides – Lasiocroton microphyllus
7. B. megalophylla – Adenophaedra megalophylla
8. B. microphylla – Lasiocroton microphyllus
