= Lasiocroton =

Scientific classification
- Kingdom: Plantae
- Clade: Tracheophytes
- Clade: Angiosperms
- Clade: Eudicots
- Clade: Rosids
- Order: Malpighiales
- Family: Euphorbiaceae
- Subfamily: Acalyphoideae
- Tribe: Adelieae
- Genus: Lasiocroton; Griseb.

Genus of flowering plants

Lasiocroton is a plant genus of the family Euphorbiaceae first described as a genus in 1859. The genus is endemic to the West Indies. It is a member of the Leucocroton alliance, which also includes Leucocroton and Garciadelia. Species in this alliance are dioecious.

Species

1. Lasiocroton bahamensis Pax & K.Hoffm. - Bahamas, Cuba, Haiti
2. Lasiocroton fawcettii Urb. - Jamaica
3. Lasiocroton gracilis Britton & P.Wilson - SE Cuba
4. Lasiocroton gutierrezii Jestrow - Cuba
5. Lasiocroton harrisii Britton - Jamaica
6. Lasiocroton macrophyllus (Sw.) Griseb. - Jamaica
7. Lasiocroton microphyllus (A.Rich.) Jestrow - Cuba

formerly included

1. moved to other genera (Bernardia Croton Leucocroton)
2. Lasiocroton cordifolius Britton & P.Wilson - Leucocroton cordifolius (Britton & P.Wilson) Alain
3. Lasiocroton prunifolius Griseb. - Croton punctatus Jacq.
4. Lasiocroton subpeltatus Urb. - Leucocroton subpeltatus (Urb.) Alain
5. Lasiocroton trelawniensis C.D.Adams - Bernardia trelawniensis (C.D.Adams) Jestrow & Proctor
