= Bernardia myricifolia =

Scientific classification
- Kingdom: Plantae
- Clade: Tracheophytes
- Clade: Angiosperms
- Clade: Eudicots
- Clade: Rosids
- Order: Malpighiales
- Family: Euphorbiaceae
- Genus: Bernardia
- Species: B. myricifolia

Binomial name
- Bernardia myricifolia (Scheele) S.Wats.

Synonyms
- Bernardia incana Tyria myricifolia

Species of flowering plant

Bernardia myricifolia is a species of flowering plant in the spurge family known by the common name mouse's eye. It is also called mouse ear, or oreja de ratón in Spanish. It is native to Texas, New Mexico, and Mexico. It grows in shrub communities on rocky, limestone hills. This is a perennial shrub growing over three meters in maximum height. The small leaves are each up to three centimeters long, oval in shape, with scallop-shaped teeth along the edges. A dioecious species, male and female individuals produce different types of flowers. Staminate inflorescences are small clusters of male flowers, and pistillate inflorescences bear solitary female flowers. The fruit is a roughly rounded woolly capsule with three prominent chambers, each containing a seed.
