= Lasiocroton harrisii =

Conservation status
- Vulnerable (IUCN 2.3)

Scientific classification
- Kingdom: Plantae
- Clade: Tracheophytes
- Clade: Angiosperms
- Clade: Eudicots
- Clade: Rosids
- Order: Malpighiales
- Family: Euphorbiaceae
- Genus: Lasiocroton
- Species: L. harrisii

Binomial name
- Lasiocroton harrisii Britton

Species of flowering plant

Lasiocroton harrisii is a species of plant in the family Euphorbiaceae. It is endemic to Jamaica and grows in thickets on limestone hills in a narrow altitudinal band.
