= Lasiocroton macrophyllus =

Conservation status
- Near Threatened (IUCN 2.3)

Scientific classification
- Kingdom: Plantae
- Clade: Tracheophytes
- Clade: Angiosperms
- Clade: Eudicots
- Clade: Rosids
- Order: Malpighiales
- Family: Euphorbiaceae
- Genus: Lasiocroton
- Species: L. macrophyllus

Binomial name
- Lasiocroton macrophyllus (Sw.) Griseb.

Species of flowering plant

Lasiocroton macrophyllus is a species of plant in the family Euphorbiaceae. It is endemic to Jamaica.
