= Crotonogynopsis =

Scientific classification
- Kingdom: Plantae
- Clade: Tracheophytes
- Clade: Angiosperms
- Clade: Eudicots
- Clade: Rosids
- Order: Malpighiales
- Family: Euphorbiaceae
- Subfamily: Acalyphoideae
- Tribe: Adelieae
- Genus: Crotonogynopsis; Pax

Type species
- Crotonogynopsis usambarica Pax

Genus of flowering plants

Crotonogynopsis is a plant genus of the family Euphorbiaceae first described as a genus in 1899. It is native to tropical Africa.

Species

1. Crotonogynopsis akeassii J.Léonard - Ivory Coast, Ghana
2. Crotonogynopsis usambarica Pax - Cameroon, Zaïre, Uganda, Tanzania, Mozambique
