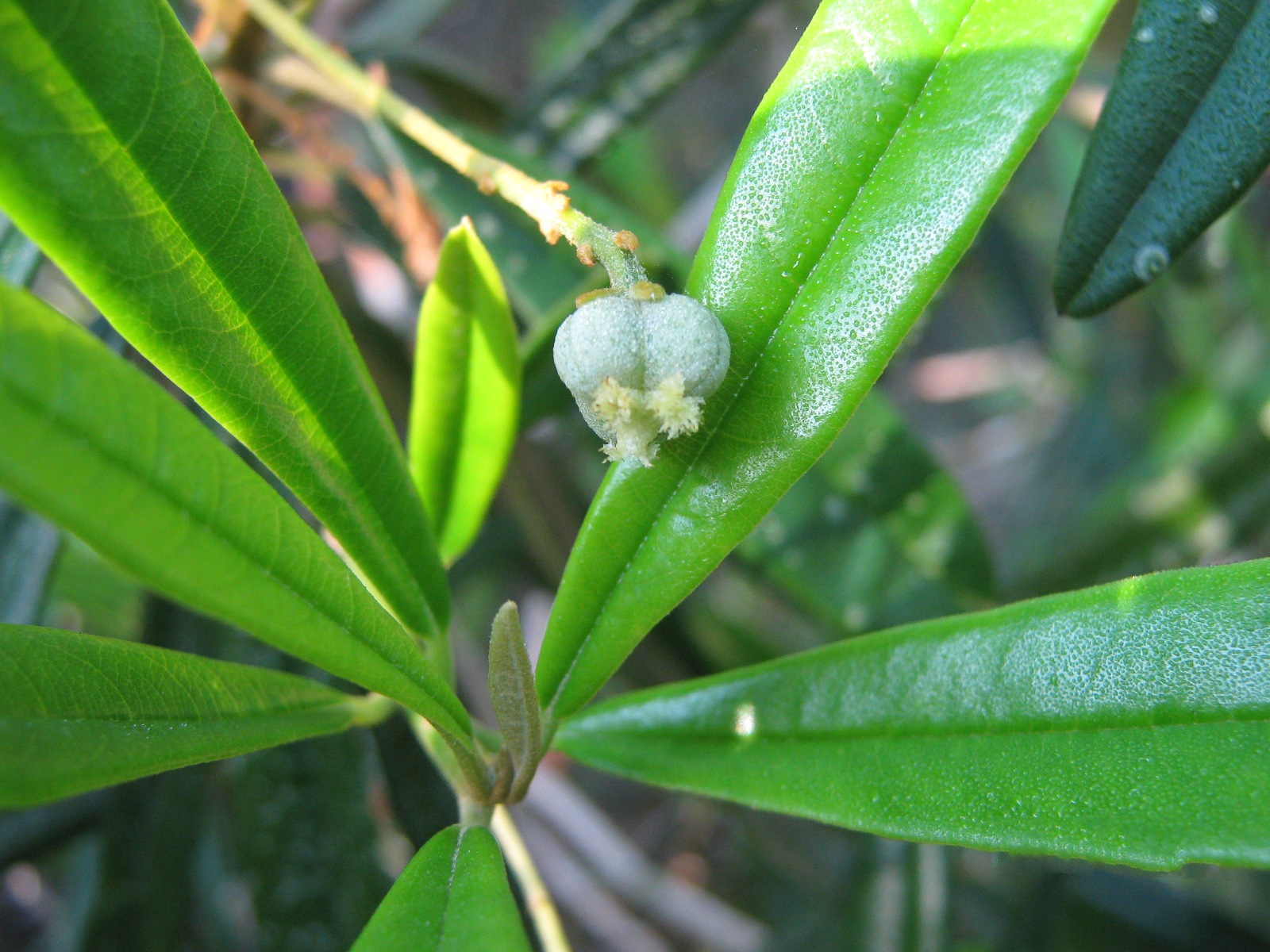
- Leucocroton havanensis

Scientific classification
- Kingdom: Plantae
- Clade: Tracheophytes
- Clade: Angiosperms
- Clade: Eudicots
- Clade: Rosids
- Order: Malpighiales
- Family: Euphorbiaceae
- Subfamily: Acalyphoideae
- Tribe: Adelieae
- Genus: Leucocroton; Griseb.

Type species
- Leucocroton wrightii Griseb.

= Leucocroton =

Genus of flowering plants

Leucocroton is a plant genus of the family Euphorbiaceae first described as a genus in 1861. The entire genus is endemic to Cuba. It is a member of the Leucocroton alliance, which also includes Garciadelia and Lasiocroton. Species in this alliance are dioecious.

Species

1. Leucocroton acunae Borhidi
2. Leucocroton anomalus Borhidi
3. Leucocroton bracteosus Urb.
4. Leucocroton brittonii Alain
5. Leucocroton comosus Urb. - Sierra de Nipe
6. Leucocroton cordifolius (Britton & P.Wilson) Alain
7. Leucocroton discolor Urb. - Sierra de Nipe
8. Leucocroton ekmanii Urb. - Sierra Sagua Baracoa
9. Leucocroton flavicans Müll.Arg.
10. Leucocroton havanensis Borhidi
11. Leucocroton incrustatus Borhidi
12. Leucocroton linearifolius Britton - Sierra de Moa
13. Leucocroton longibracteatus Borhidi
14. Leucocroton moaensis Borhidi & O.Muñiz
15. Leucocroton moncadae Borhidi
16. Leucocroton obovatus Urb. - Sierra del Cristal
17. Leucocroton pachyphylloides Borhidi
18. Leucocroton pachyphyllus Urb. - Sierra de Moa
19. Leucocroton pallidus Britton & P.Wilson
20. Leucocroton revolutus C.Wright
21. Leucocroton sameki Borhidi
22. Leucocroton saxicola Britton - Sierra de Nipe
23. Leucocroton stenophyllus Urb. - Sierra de Nipe
24. Leucocroton subpeltatus (Urb.) Alain
25. Leucocroton virens Griseb.
26. Leucocroton wrightii Griseb.

formerly included

moved to other genera (Garciadelia and Lasiocroton)

1. Leucocroton leprosus - Garciadelia leprosa
2. Leucocroton microphyllus - Lasiocroton microphyllus
