= Enriquebeltrania =

Scientific classification
- Kingdom: Plantae
- Clade: Tracheophytes
- Clade: Angiosperms
- Clade: Eudicots
- Clade: Rosids
- Order: Malpighiales
- Family: Euphorbiaceae
- Subfamily: Acalyphoideae
- Tribe: Adelieae
- Genus: Enriquebeltrania; Rzed.

Type species
- Enriquebeltrania crenatifolia (Miranda) Rzed.

Synonyms
- Beltrania Miranda 1957, illegitimate homonym, not Penz. 1882

Genus of flowering plants

Enriquebeltrania is a plant genus in the family Euphorbiaceae, first described in 1957. It was initially given the name Beltrania, but this turned out to be an illegitimate homonym. In other words, someone else had already applied the name to a different plant, so this one had to be renamed. The genus is native to western and southern Mexico.

Species

1. Enriquebeltrania crenatifolia (Miranda) Rzed. 1979 - Campeche, Quintana Roo, Yucatán
2. Enriquebeltrania disjuncta De-Nova & Sosa 2006 - Jalisco, Sinaloa
