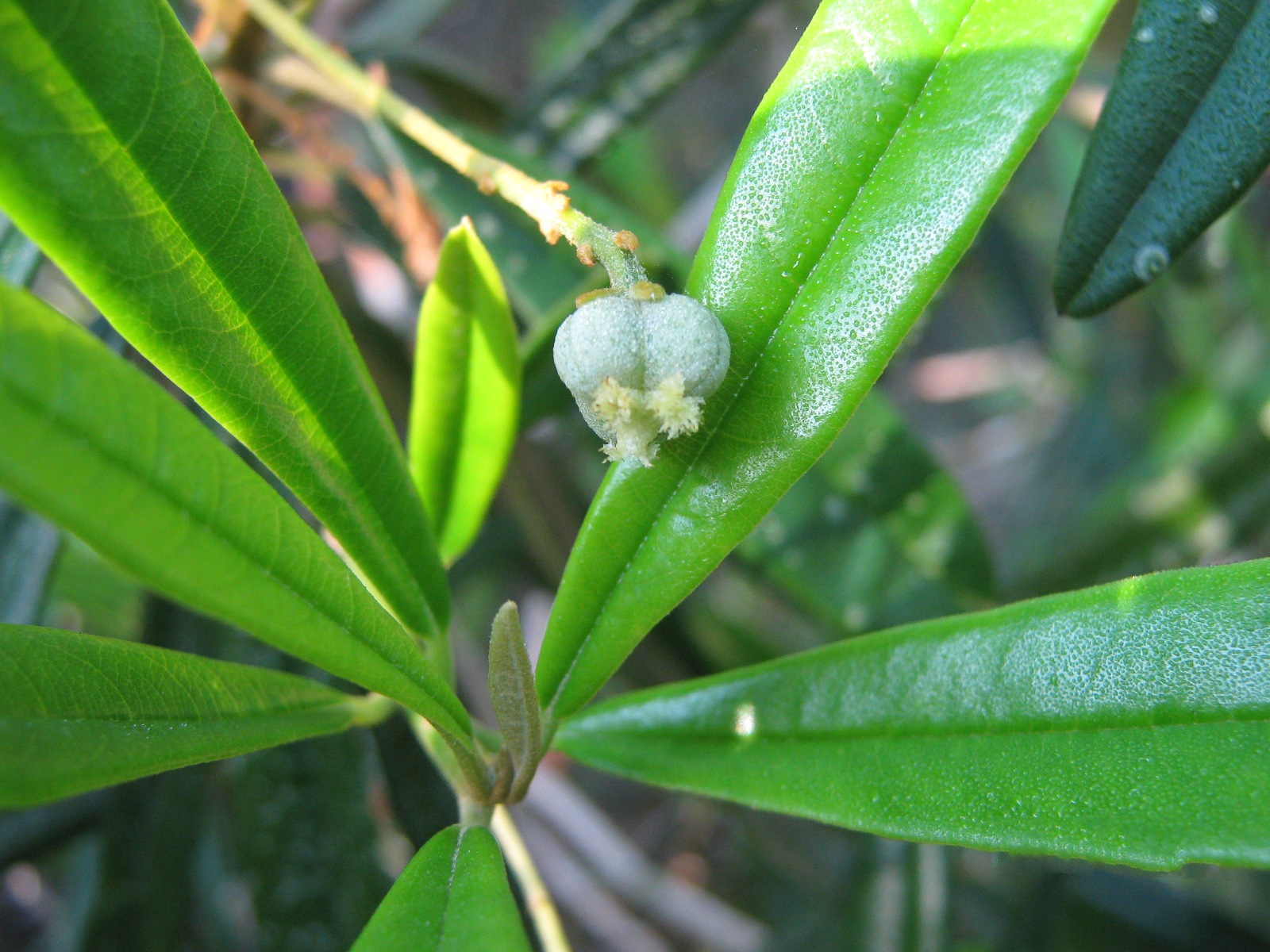
- Leucocroton havanensis

Scientific classification
- Kingdom: Plantae
- Clade: Tracheophytes
- Clade: Angiosperms
- Clade: Eudicots
- Clade: Rosids
- Order: Malpighiales
- Family: Euphorbiaceae
- Subfamily: Acalyphoideae
- Tribe: Adelieae; G.L.Webster

Genera
- See text

= Adelieae =

Tribe of flowering plants

Adelieae is a tribe of the subfamily Acalyphoideae, under the family Euphorbiaceae. It comprises 5 genera.

== Genera ==
- Adelia L.
- Crotonogynopsis Pax
- Enriquebeltrania Rzed.
- Garciadelia Jestrow & Jiménez Rodr.
- Lasiocroton Griseb.
- Leucocroton Griseb.

== See also ==
- Taxonomy of the Euphorbiaceae
