= Forestiera cartaginensis =

Central American olive

Conservation status
- Critically Endangered (IUCN 3.1)

Scientific classification
- Kingdom: Plantae
- Clade: Tracheophytes
- Clade: Angiosperms
- Clade: Eudicots
- Clade: Asterids
- Order: Lamiales
- Family: Oleaceae
- Genus: Forestiera
- Species: F. cartaginensis

Binomial name
- Forestiera cartaginensis Donn.Sm.

Synonyms
- Forestiera chiapensis Standl.; Forestiera hondurensis Standl. & L.O.Williams

Species of flowering plant

Forestiera cartaginensis, the Central American olive, is a shrub native to Central America and to Chiapas in southern Mexico.
