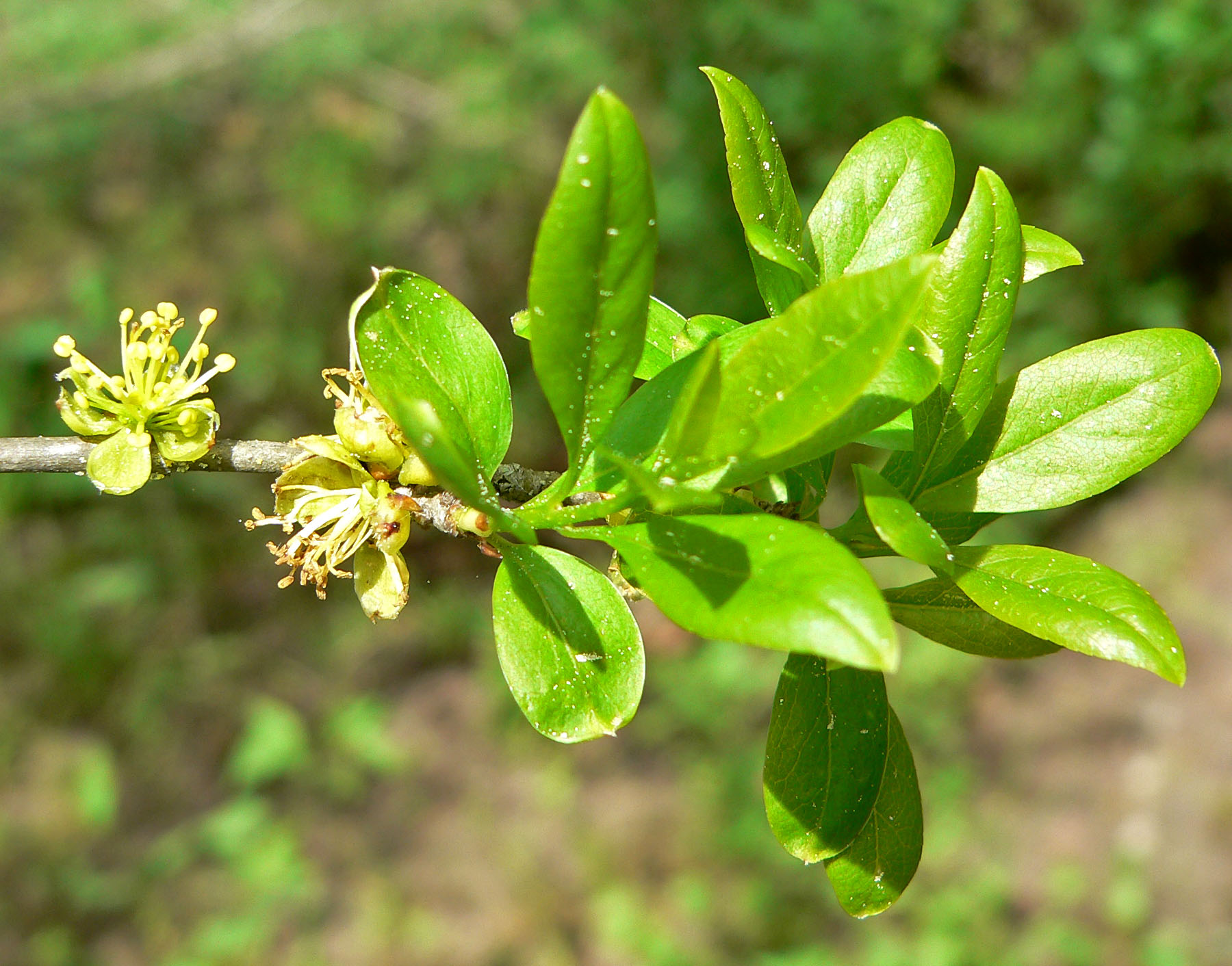

Conservation status
- Apparently Secure (NatureServe)

Scientific classification
- Kingdom: Plantae
- Clade: Tracheophytes
- Clade: Angiosperms
- Clade: Eudicots
- Clade: Asterids
- Order: Lamiales
- Family: Oleaceae
- Genus: Forestiera
- Species: F. pubescens

Binomial name
- Forestiera pubescens Nutt.

Varieties
- F. p. var. parvifolia; F. p. var. pubescens

Synonyms
- List: Adelia neomexicana (A.Gray) Kuntze; Adelia parvifolia (A.Gray) Small; Adelia pubescens (Nutt.) Kuntze; Adelia sphaerocarpa (Torr.) Kuntze; Forestiera acuminata var. parvifolia A.Gray; Forestiera arizonica (A.Gray) Rydb.; Forestiera ligustrina var. pubescens (Nutt.) A.Gray; Forestiera neomexicana A.Gray; Forestiera sphaerocarpa Torr.

= Forestiera pubescens =

Plant species in the olive family

Forestiera pubescens, commonly known as stretchberry, desert olive, tanglewood, devil's elbow, elbow bush, spring goldenglow, spring herald, New Mexico privet, or Texas forsythia is a deciduous shrub or small tree native to the southwestern United States (Texas, Oklahoma, New Mexico, Arizona, Colorado, Utah, Nevada, California) and northern Mexico.
