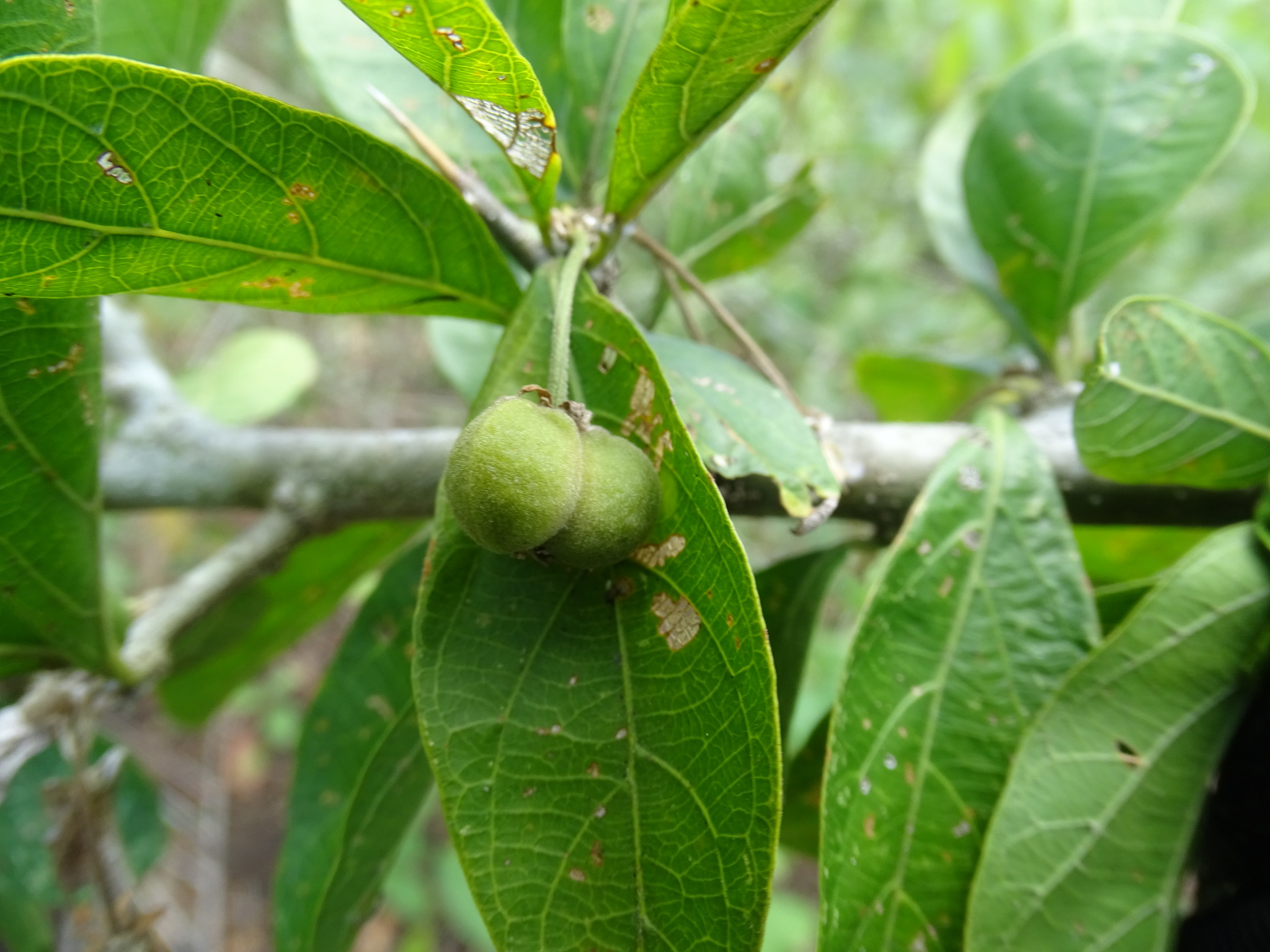
- Adelia barbinervis with fruit

Scientific classification
- Kingdom: Plantae
- Clade: Tracheophytes
- Clade: Angiosperms
- Clade: Eudicots
- Clade: Rosids
- Order: Malpighiales
- Family: Euphorbiaceae
- Genus: Adelia
- Species: A. barbinervis

Binomial name
- Adelia barbinervis Schlecht. & Cham.

= Adelia barbinervis =

Species of flowering plant

Adelia barbinervis is a species of flowering plant in the family Euphorbiaceae that is native to southern Mexico and northern Central America. The Huastec Maya cultivated the plant as a famine food.

== Description ==
Adelia barbinervis is a shrub, or as a tree that grows to be 2–9 meters tall. The bark is spinescent, thin, and gray to whitish.

The leaves grow with an alternate (spiral) pattern. The upper side is dark green and hairless while the underside is paler and pubescent (covered with short, soft hairs) along the veins. Rarely, the underside of the leaf is tomentose, i.e. densely covered in short, matted hairs. The leaves have 5–7 lateral veins. The axils of the veins have tufts of hair called domatia. The leaves are lanceolate (pointy at both ends) with a length of 4–9 cm and a width of 2–3.5 cm. The margins are entire. The leaves are connected to their twig by a 2–5 mm petiole, which is pubescent. The inconspicuous stipules at the base of the petiole are pubescent and, like the leaves, lanceolate.

Plants flower from November to January. The species is dioecious: male and female flowers are not found on the same plant. Flowers grow from the axils of the leaves. The male flowers grow in cymose fascicles of 10–30 flowers. The male pedicels are pubescent and just 3.5–7 mm long. Male flowers have 3–5 greenish or whitish ovate sepals, which are about 2 mm long and pubescent on both sides. Male flowers have 8–12 whitish stamens, each with 2-mm filaments and globose anthers, that are joined at the base. The female flowers have longer pedicels, 15–30 mm long. Female flowers have 5–7 green, linear-lanceolate sepals 2–3 mm long, the upper surfaces of which are puberulent. The ovary is tomentose. The three yellow or white 1.5–2 mm styles are flat and widened, joined at the base, and have lacerate (jagged) edges at the apex.

The species produces fruit from January to April. The fruit is a green, pubescent, three-lobed capsule 1.1 mm in diameter that dehisces when dry. The smooth, pale seeds inside are 3.5–4.5 mm long and subglobose.

== Taxonomy ==
Adelia barbinervis was first described by Cham. & Schltdl. and was published in Linnaea 6: 362 in 1831. Ricinella barbinervis (Cham. & Schltdl.) Müll.Arg., published in Linnaea 34: 154 (1865), is a homotypic synonym of Adelia barbinervis.

The specific epithet barbinervis means "bearded veins" and refers to the leaves’ domatia.

Adelia barbinervis is closely related to A. triloba.

== Distribution and habitat ==
Adelia barbinervis is native to seasonally dry climates from Mexico to Nicaragua, where it is found in tropical rainforests, tropical deciduous forests, and secondary forests at elevations of 0–500 m. It is common in milpa regrowth ecosystems.

== Uses ==
The Huastec Maya cultivated the plant as a famine food, cooking the shoots and tender leaves as greens. The wood is used as firewood.
