= Bernardia trelawniensis =

Conservation status
- Endangered (IUCN 2.3)

Scientific classification
- Kingdom: Plantae
- Clade: Tracheophytes
- Clade: Angiosperms
- Clade: Eudicots
- Clade: Rosids
- Order: Malpighiales
- Family: Euphorbiaceae
- Genus: Bernardia
- Species: B. trelawniensis

Binomial name
- Bernardia trelawniensis (C.D.Adams) Jestrow & Proctor

Synonyms
- Lasiocroton trelawniensis C.D.Adams

Species of flowering plant

Bernardia trelawniensis is a species of flowering plant in the euphorb family, Euphorbiaceae. It is a shrub endemic to Trelawny Parish in the Cockpit Country of Jamaica. The authors of a 2008 publication reclassified the species as Critically Endangered according to the IUCN guidelines.
