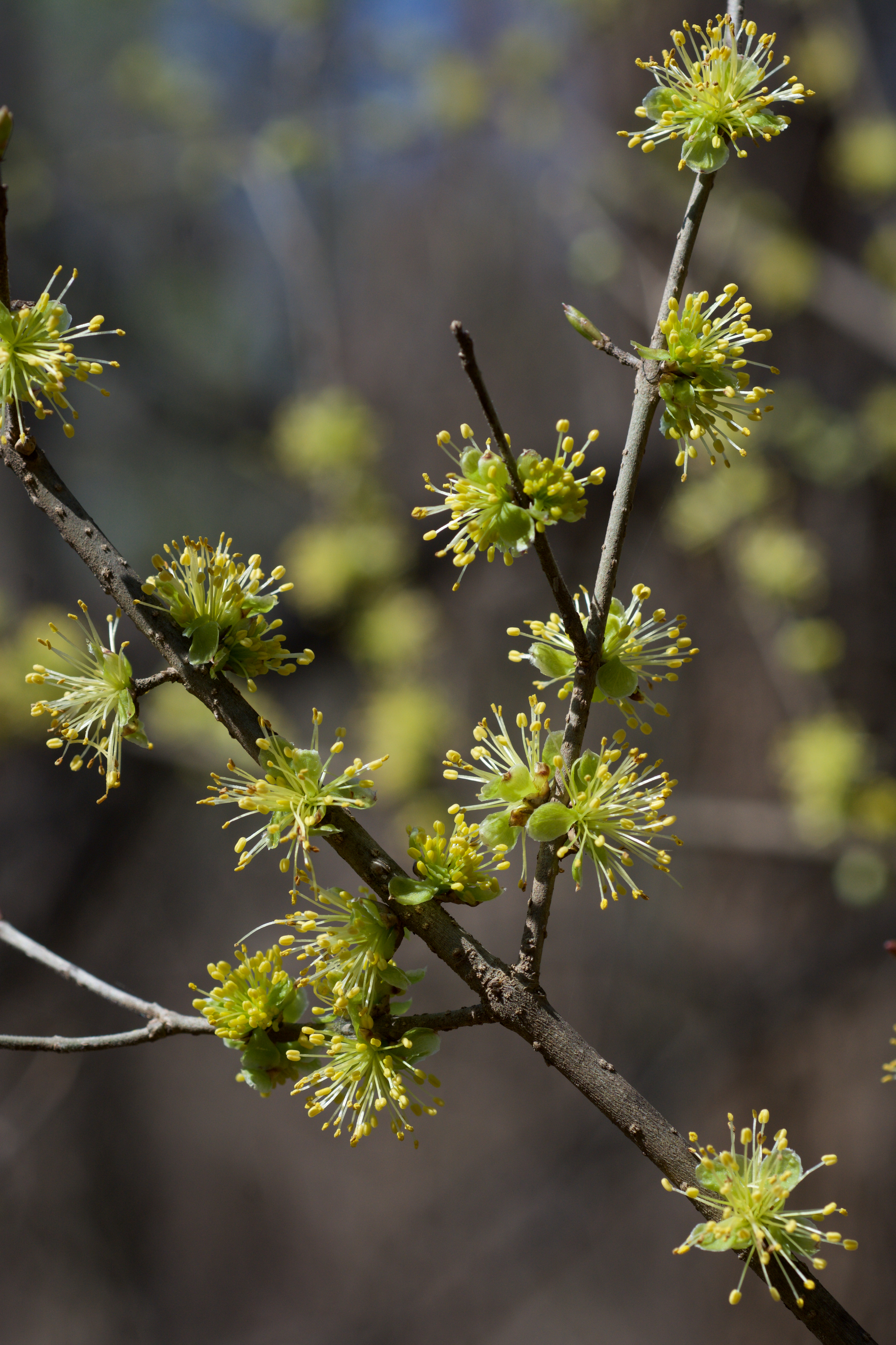

Conservation status
- Least Concern (IUCN 3.1)

Scientific classification
- Kingdom: Plantae
- Clade: Tracheophytes
- Clade: Angiosperms
- Clade: Eudicots
- Clade: Asterids
- Order: Lamiales
- Family: Oleaceae
- Genus: Forestiera
- Species: F. acuminata

Binomial name
- Forestiera acuminata (Michx.) Poir.
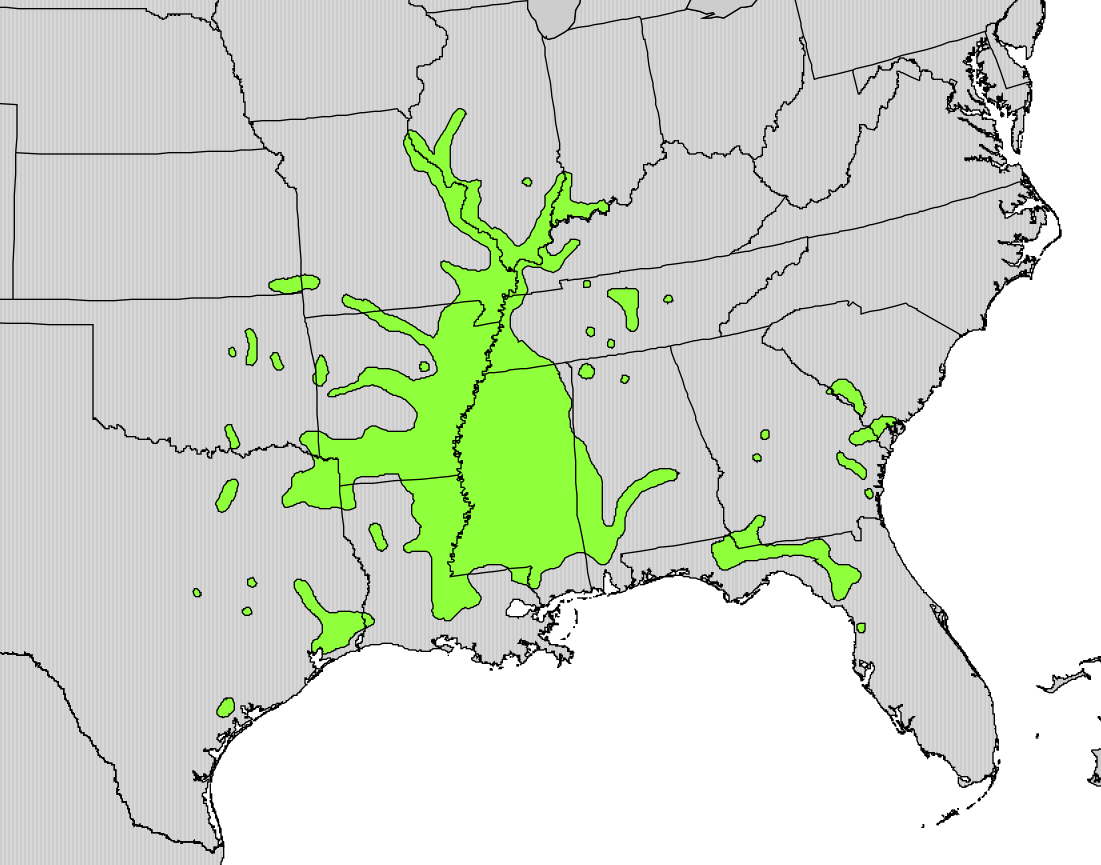

= Forestiera acuminata =

Species of flowering plant

Forestiera acuminata, commonly known as eastern swamp privet, is a deciduous shrub or small tree that is native to the southeastern and central United States, growing primarily in or near wetlands. It is especially common along the Mississippi Valley as far north as Illinois and Indiana, but found also across the South from eastern Texas to South Carolina. It grows in swamp forests as well as rocky edges of streams and ponds.

The species withstands flooding and its fruit is consumed by wild ducks.
