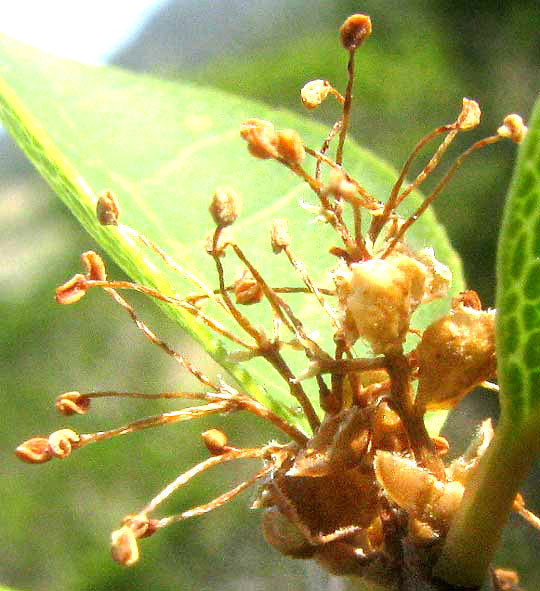
- Netleaf forestiera dried-out male flowers

Scientific classification
- Kingdom: Plantae
- Clade: Embryophytes
- Clade: Tracheophytes
- Clade: Spermatophytes
- Clade: Angiosperms
- Clade: Eudicots
- Clade: Asterids
- Order: Lamiales
- Family: Oleaceae
- Genus: Forestiera
- Species: F. reticulata

Binomial name
- Forestiera reticulata Torr.

Synonyms
- Adelia reticulata (Torr.) Kuntze; Gymnanthes texana Standl.

= Forestiera reticulata =

Species of plant

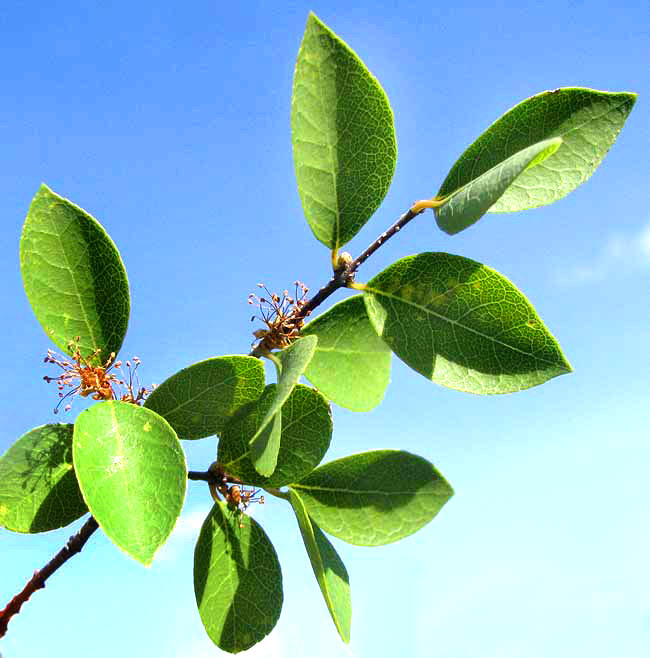
Forestiera reticulata leafy stem with dried male flowers

Forestiera reticulata, sometimes called netleaf forestiera, is a species of small tree belonging to the family Oleaceae.

== Description ==
Here are some features helpful for distinguishing netleaf forestiera from other Forestiera species:

- It grows up to 8 metres (26 ft) tall, with branches which are hairless or almost so, and dotted with minute whitish warts.
- Leaves with short petioles grow opposite one another, with leathery, undivided, egg-shaped to almost rounded blades which are up to 7.5 cm (3.0 in) long; blade margins have no indentations or projections, though sometimes they develop a few tiny teeth.
- Blades are dark green, somewhat shiny on the top surface and paler on the underside; both surfaces display a striking network of reticulating veins, and both surfaces can be variously hairy to hairless.
- Flowers, up to 9 per cluster, develop no corollas, though each flower has 4 sepals, and is subtended by bracts up to 2.5 mm (0.10 in) long.
- Flowers are functionally male or female (plants are dioecious), with each male flower having up 4 stamens with filaments up to 3 mm (0.12 in) long; sometimes female flowers, beside the pistil, produce staminodes.
- Drupe-type fruits are ellipsoid to nearly spherical, up to 10 mm (0.39 in) long, hairless, and often the fruit retains the flower's style and sepals; when mature they are dark blue to black, with only a little flesh, or mesocarp, which tastes sweet.

== Distribution ==
Netleaf forestiera mainly is a Mexican species, though in the USA it occurs in part of southwestern Texas.

In Mexico it is found from the Mexican border with Texas in the states of Coahuila, Nuevo León and Tamaulipas south through most of the country to the southernmost state of Chiapas, as well as Oaxaca, Puebla and Veracruz, being absent from northwestern Mexico and Baja California, and the Yucatan Peninsula.

== Habitat ==
In Texas, netleaf forestiera inhabits crevices of rocks and is found in ravines. Images on this page show a bush on a limestone ledge in Texas, at an elevation of ~1750m (~5750 ft).

In Mexico's Central Mexican Plateau region, where it is considered a calcicole, it occurs mainly in Sierra Madre Oriental pine-oak forests, as well as other relatively cool and moist mountain forests, pine forests, tropical deciduous forests and, in the foothills, dry scrub .

== Ecology ==
In Texas, all Forestiera species are considered to be important food sources for many birds and small mammals. Some species are among the most sought-after browse in southern and western Texas and tend to disappear in over-browsed areas. Livestock feed on twigs and fruit, and the flowers are an important source of nectar for bees early in the growing season.

== Taxonomy ==
Forestiera reticulata is one of many species new to science collected by botanists during the United States and Mexican Boundary Survey conducted from 1848 to 1855, and published by John Torrey in a report by the US. Government under the heading "Botany of the Boundary."

=== Etymology ===
While many sources claim that the genus name Forestiera honors a Charles Le Forestier, who died in 1820 and was a French naturalist and physician, and others claim that it honors Pierre Gaspard Forestier, a physician in Paris who died in 1847, Poiret dedicated the genus "to my estimable & old friend Forestier, physician & learned naturalist at Saint-Quentin" who died before 1820 . This can only refer to Robert André Forestier, 1742-1812. The claim for Charles Le Forestier stems from Wittstein's claim in his 1852 Etymologisch-botanisches Handwörterbuch, "After Charles Leforestier; wrote with Lefebure : Floral album of native plants of France, Paris 1829." Charles Leforestier was not a physician, but a gendarme, and his botanical works were made after the death of the doctor in Saint Quentin.

The species name reticulata was chosen by John Torrey in 1859 because, as he wrote of the species' leaves, "... the veins strongly reticulated, especially (in the dry specimens) on the upper surface." The word "reticulated" is based on the Latin adjective reticulatus.
