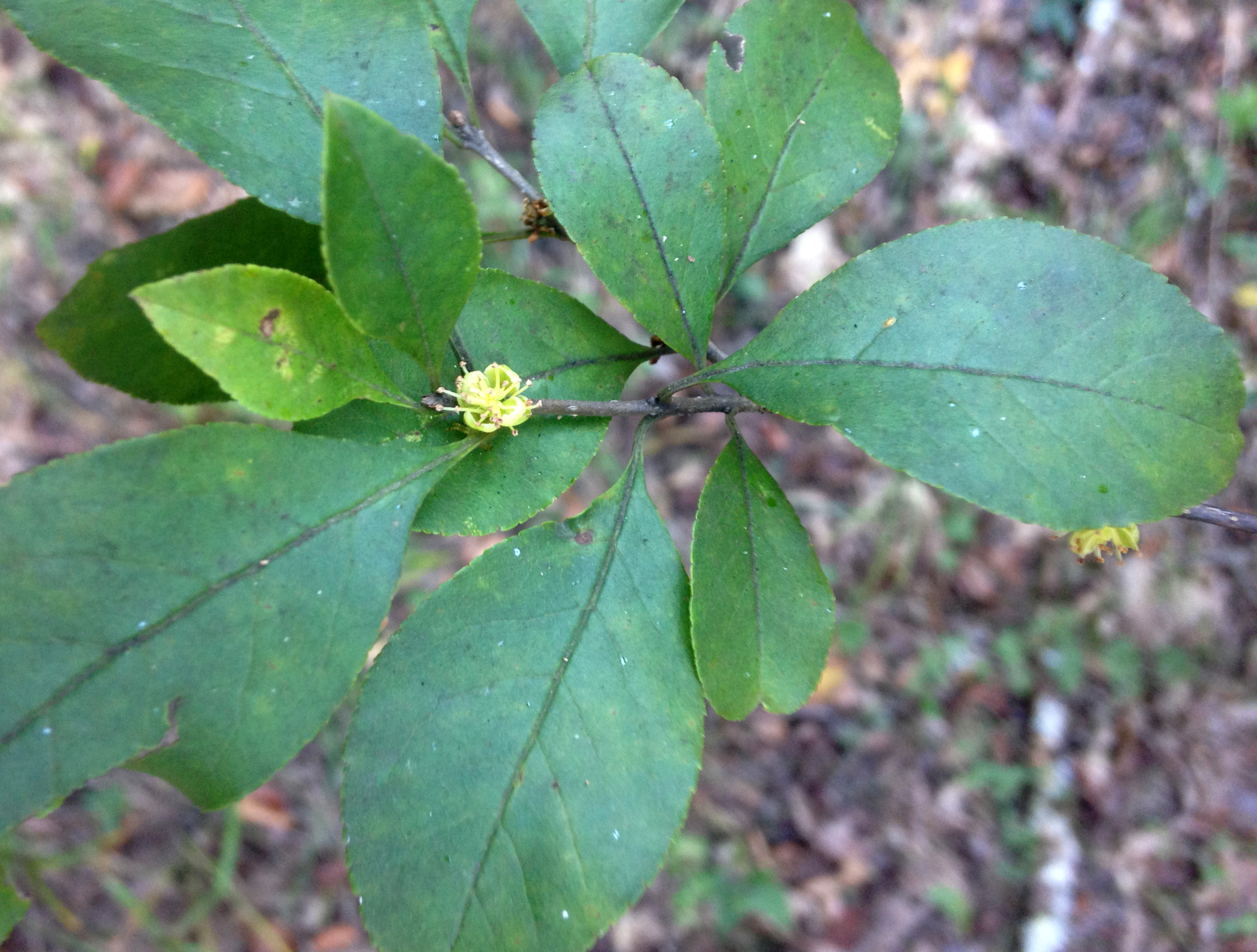

Scientific classification
- Kingdom: Plantae
- Clade: Tracheophytes
- Clade: Angiosperms
- Clade: Eudicots
- Clade: Asterids
- Order: Lamiales
- Family: Oleaceae
- Genus: Forestiera
- Species: F. ligustrina

Binomial name
- Forestiera ligustrina (Michx.) Poir.

= Forestiera ligustrina =

Species of shrub

Forestiera ligustrina, commonly called southern-privet, is a shrub in the olive family (Oleaceae). It is native to the Southeastern United States. Its natural habitat is in upland calcareous woodlands and glades. It is also found on coastal shell middens.

Forestiera ligustrina can be distinguished from the similar-looking Forestiera godfreyi by having smaller leaves with less pubescent petioles, and by its twig pubescence being group in two lines (as opposed to twigs with uniform pubescence). It flowers in mid to late summer.
