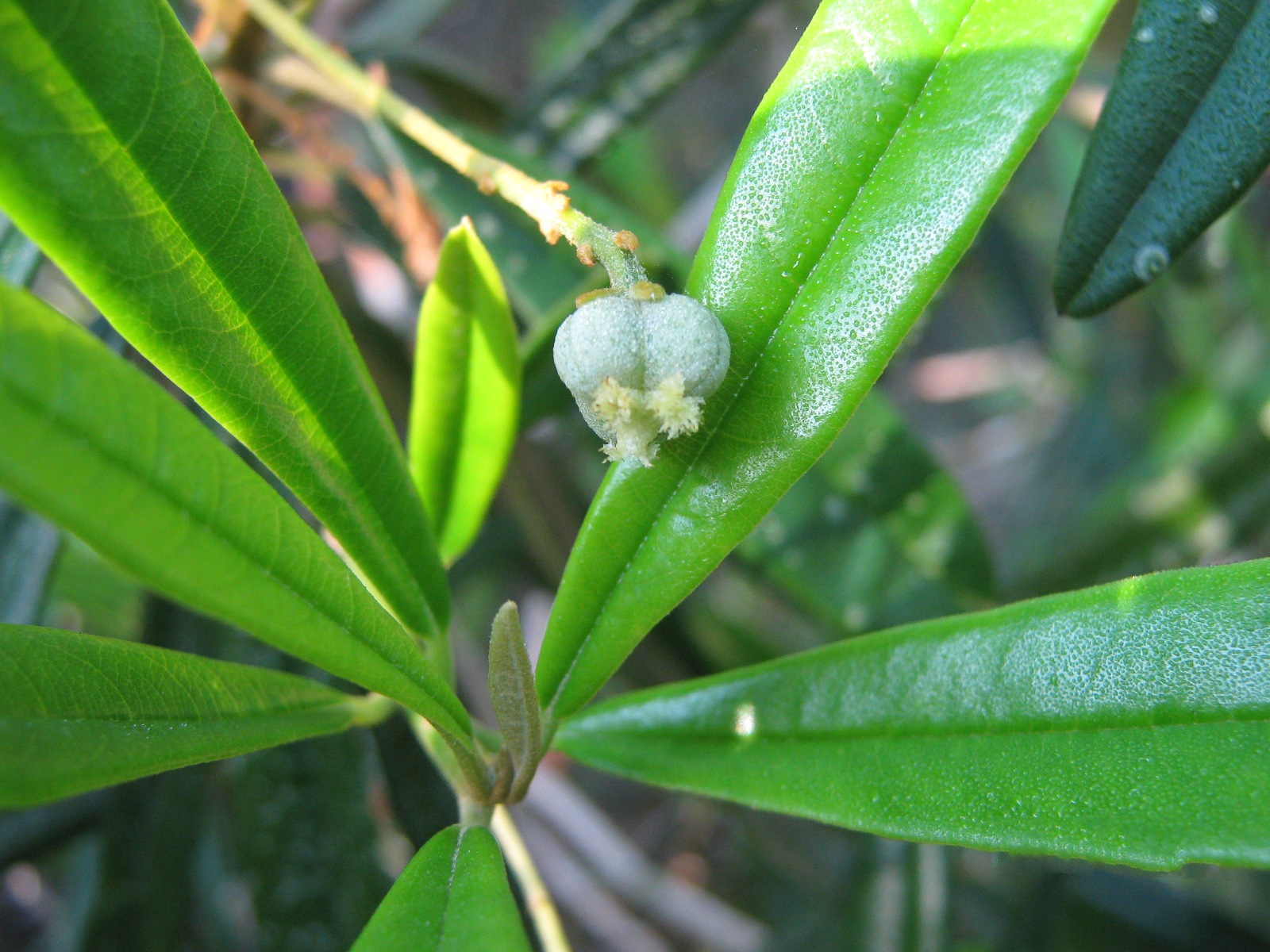

Scientific classification
- Kingdom: Plantae
- Clade: Tracheophytes
- Clade: Angiosperms
- Clade: Eudicots
- Clade: Rosids
- Order: Malpighiales
- Family: Euphorbiaceae
- Genus: Leucocroton
- Species: L. havanensis

Binomial name
- Leucocroton havanensis Borhidi

= Leucocroton havanensis =

Species of flowering plant

Leucocroton havanensis is an endemic species to Cuba. It is located on serpentine soils and limestone rock in the western and central part of the country. It is an evergreen tree that has dioecious flowering, meaning the species has distinct male and female individuals. The plant only grows on a small serpentine island.

== Cultivation and uses ==
Scientists have discovered that the genus Leucocroton is a nickel hyperaccumulator, which means it can absorb dangerous amounts of nickel.
