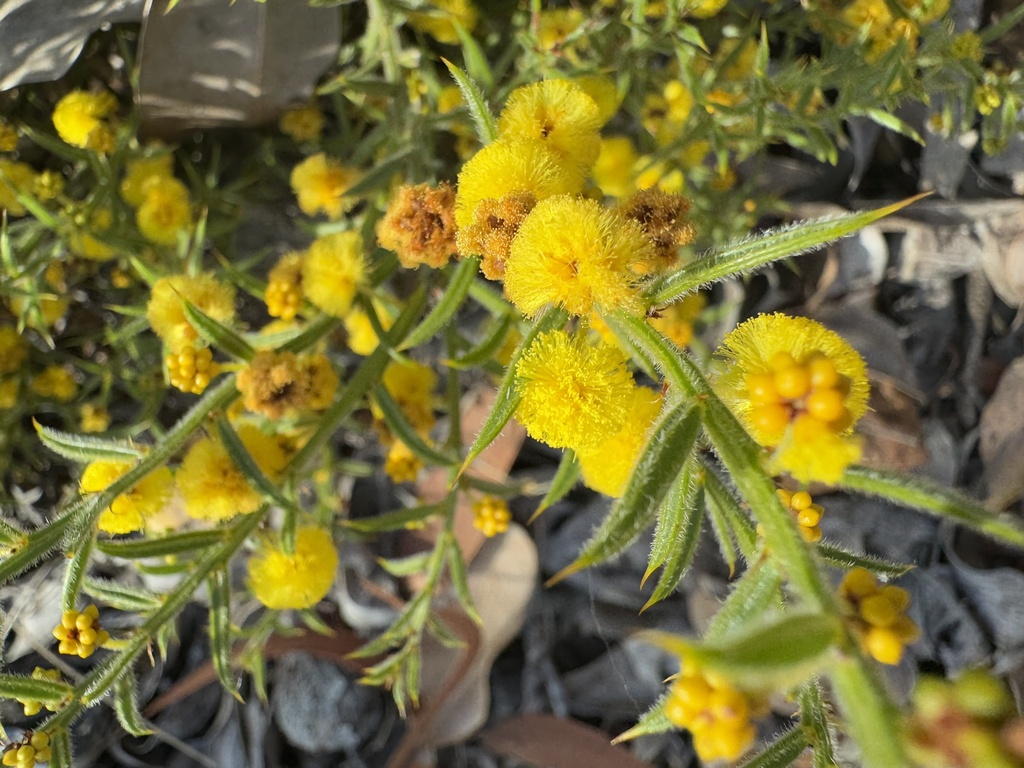
- Subspecies barbinervis

Scientific classification
- Kingdom: Plantae
- Clade: Tracheophytes
- Clade: Angiosperms
- Clade: Eudicots
- Clade: Rosids
- Order: Fabales
- Family: Fabaceae
- Subfamily: Caesalpinioideae
- Clade: Mimosoid clade
- Genus: Acacia
- Species: A. barbinervis

Binomial name
- Acacia barbinervis Benth.
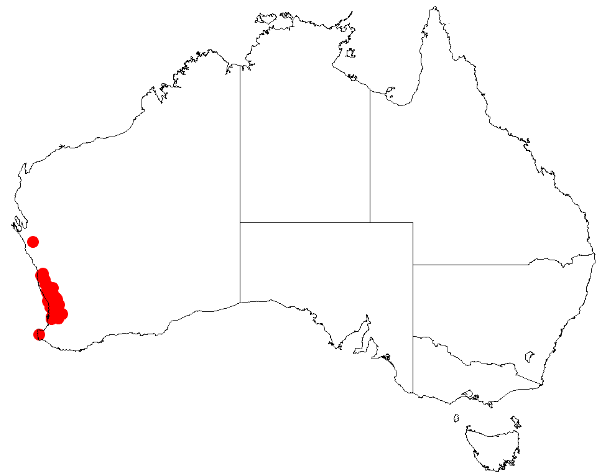
- Acacia barbinervis occurrence data from Australasian Virtual Herbarium

Synonyms
- Racosperma barbinerve (Benth.) Pedley

= Acacia barbinervis =

Species of legume

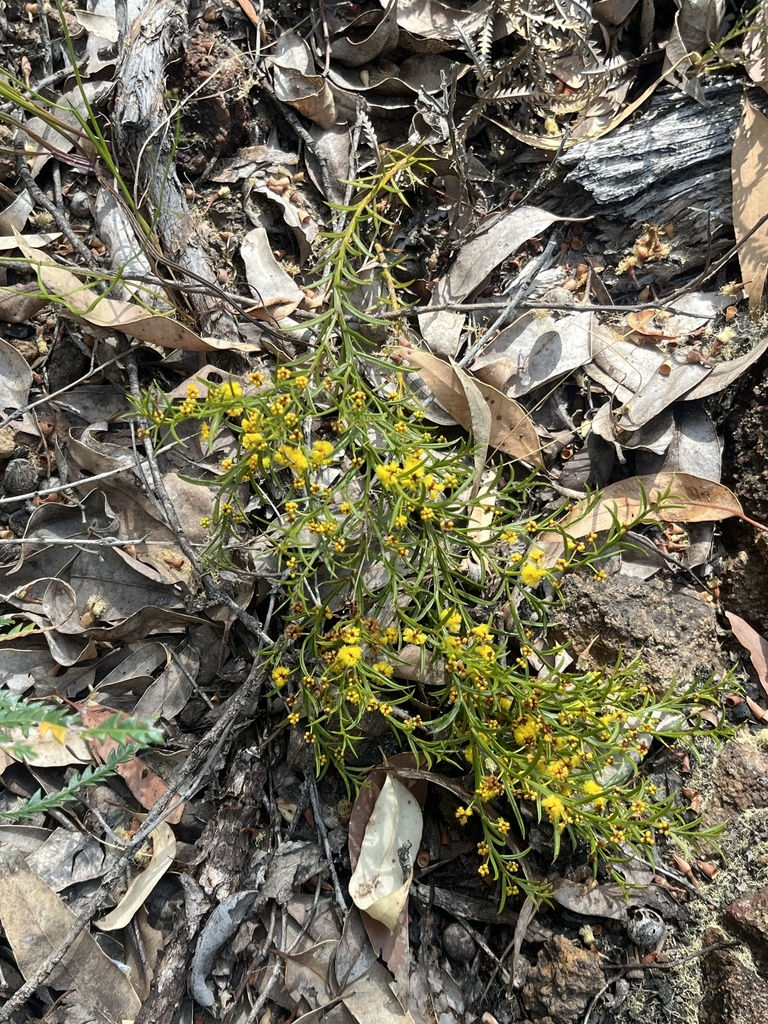
Habit near the Serpentine Dam

Acacia barbinervis is a species of flowering plant in the family Fabaceae and is endemic to the south-west of Western Australia. It is a spreading shrub with many stems, sessile, linear phyllodes and spherical heads of golden- or creamy-yellow flowers and curved leathery to thinly crust-like pods up to 70 mm (2.8 in) long.

== Description ==
Acacia barbinervis is a spreading shrub typically grows to a height of 20–40 cm (7.9–15.7 in) and has many branches. Its phyllodes are sessile, linear, 10–30 mm (0.39–1.18 in) long and 1.0–2.5 mm (0.039–0.098 in) wide and sharply pointed, with five raised veins. There are linear, bristly stipules 1.5–4.5 mm (0.059–0.177 in) long at the base of the phyllodes. The flowers are borne in one or two spherical heads in axils on a peduncle 5–14 mm (0.20–0.55 in) long, each head with 12 to 22 golden- or creamy-yellow flowers. Flowering occurs in summer, and the pods are curved, leathery to somewhat crust-like and circular in cross section, up to 70 mm (2.8 in) long and about 4 mm (0.16 in) wide. The seeds are oblong, 5.5–6.0 mm (0.22–0.24 in) long with a cone-shaped aril.

== Taxonomy ==
Acacia barbinervis was first formally described in 1842 by the botanist George Bentham in Hooker's London Journal of Botany from specimens collected by James Drummond. The specific name (barbinervis) means 'beard-nerved', referring to the hairy edges of the phyllodes.

In 1999, Bruce Maslin described two subspecies of A. barbinervis in the journal Nuytsia and the names are accepted by the Australian Plant Census:

- Acacia barbinervis Benth.Benth. subsp. barbinervis has slightly curved phyllodes, branchlets sharply angled near the tip and golden-yellow flowers.
- Acacia barbinervis subsp. borealis Maslin has mainly straight phyllodes, branchlets scarcely angled, and creamy-yellow flowers. The epithet borealis means 'northern', referring to the distribution of this subspecies compared to the autonym.

== Distribution and habitat ==
This species of wattle occurs from near Eneabba to Waroona in the Geraldton Sandplains, Jarrah Forest and Swan Coastal Plain bioregions of south-western Western Australia. Subspecies barbinervis grows in lateritic soils in jarra and marri woodland and forest in the Darling Range between Bindoon, Toodyay and Waroona, and subsp. borealis grows in sand and gravel in open heath and low Banksia woodland.

== Conservation status ==
Acacia barbiervis and both of its subspecies are listed as "not threatened" by the Government of Western Australia Department of Biodiversity, Conservation and Attractions.

== See also ==
- List of Acacia species
