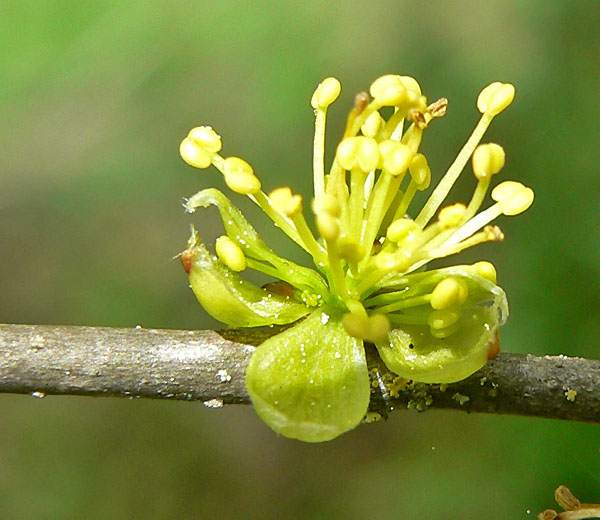
- Forestiera pubescens

Scientific classification
- Kingdom: Plantae
- Clade: Tracheophytes
- Clade: Angiosperms
- Clade: Eudicots
- Clade: Asterids
- Order: Lamiales
- Family: Oleaceae
- Tribe: Oleeae
- Subtribe: Oleinae
- Genus: Forestiera; Poir.

Synonyms
- List: Adelia P.Browne; Bigelovia Sm.; Borya Willd.; Carpoxis Raf.; Geisarina Raf.; Nudilus Raf.; Piptolepis Benth.

= Forestiera =

Genus of flowering plants

Forestiera is a genus of flowering plants in the olive family, Oleaceae. Members of the genus are often called swampprivets. Most are shrubs.

== Species ==
There are about 20 species, native to Mexico, Central America, the West Indies, Ecuador and the southern half of the United States. Phylogenetics indicate that Forestiera is sister to Hesperelaea, an extinct North American lineage.

The following species are recognised in the genus Forestiera:

- Forestiera acuminata (Michx.) Poir. – eastern swampprivet - central and southeastern United States
- Forestiera angustifolia Torr. – narrowleaf forestiera, Texas forestiera, Texas swampprivet - Texas, northeastern Mexico
- Forestiera cartaginensis Donn. Central America, southern Mexico
- Forestiera corollata Cornejo & Wallander Guatemala
- Forestiera durangensis Standl. - Durango
- Forestiera ecuadorensis Cornejo & Bonifaz - Ecuador
- Forestiera eggersiana Krug & Urban – inkbush - Puerto Rico, Leeward Islands
- Forestiera godfreyi L.C. Anders. – Godfrey's swampprivet - Florida, Georgia, South Carolina
- Forestiera isabelae Hammel & Cornejo - Costa Rica
- Forestiera ligustrina (Michx.) Poir. – upland swamp-privet - Texas, southeastern United States
- Forestiera macrocarpa Brandegee - Baja California Sur
- Forestiera phillyreoides (Benth.) Torr. in W.H.Emory - central and southern Mexico
- Forestiera pubescens Nutt. – downy forestiera, stretchberry - southwestern United States, northern Mexico
- Forestiera racemosa S.Watson - Nuevo León
- Forestiera reticulata Torr. – netleaf swampprivet - western Texas
- Forestiera rhamnifolia Griseb. – caca ravet - Central America, West Indies, southern Mexico, Isla Socorro
- Forestiera rotundifolia (Brandegee) Standl.
- Forestiera segregata Krug & Urban – Florida swampprivet - Florida, Georgia, South Carolina, much of West Indies including Puerto Rico, Bahamas, Cayman Islands
- Forestiera selleana Urb. & Ekman - Hispaniola
- Forestiera shrevei Standl. – desert olive - Arizona
- Forestiera tomentosa S.Watson - central and southern Mexico
- Forestiera veracruzana Cast.-Campos & Pal.-Wass.
