= Forestiera angustifolia =

Conservation status
- Least Concern (IUCN 3.1)

Scientific classification
- Kingdom: Plantae
- Clade: Tracheophytes
- Clade: Angiosperms
- Clade: Eudicots
- Clade: Asterids
- Order: Lamiales
- Family: Oleaceae
- Genus: Forestiera
- Species: F. angustifolia

Binomial name
- Forestiera angustifolia Torr.

Synonyms
- Adelia angustifolia (Torr.) Kuntze; Forestiera puberula Eastw.; Forestiera texana Cory; Forestiera texana var. palmeri Cory

Species of plant

Forestiera angustifolia, the narrowleaf forestiera, is a species of flowering plant in the family Oleaceae. It is native to Texas and Mexico. An evergreen shrub reaching 6 ft (1.8 m), it is typically found growing in dry, alkaline soils.
