= Garciadelia =

Scientific classification
- Kingdom: Plantae
- Clade: Tracheophytes
- Clade: Angiosperms
- Clade: Eudicots
- Clade: Rosids
- Order: Malpighiales
- Family: Euphorbiaceae
- Subfamily: Acalyphoideae
- Tribe: Adelieae
- Genus: Garciadelia; Jestrow & Jiménez Rodr.

Genus of flowering plants

Garciadelia is a plant genus of the family Euphorbiaceae first described as a genus in 2010. The entire genus is endemic to the Island of Hispaniola in the West Indies (divided between Haiti and the Dominican Republic. It is a member of the Leucocroton alliance, which also includes Leucocroton and Lasiocroton. Species in this alliance are dioecious.

Species

1. Garciadelia abbottii Jestrow & Jiménez Rodr. - Dominican Republic
2. Garciadelia castilloae Jestrow & Jiménez Rodr. - Dominican Republic
3. Garciadelia leprosa (Willd.) Jestrow & Jiménez Rodr. - Haiti, Dominican Republic
4. Garciadelia mejiae Jestrow & Jiménez Rodr. - Dominican Republic
