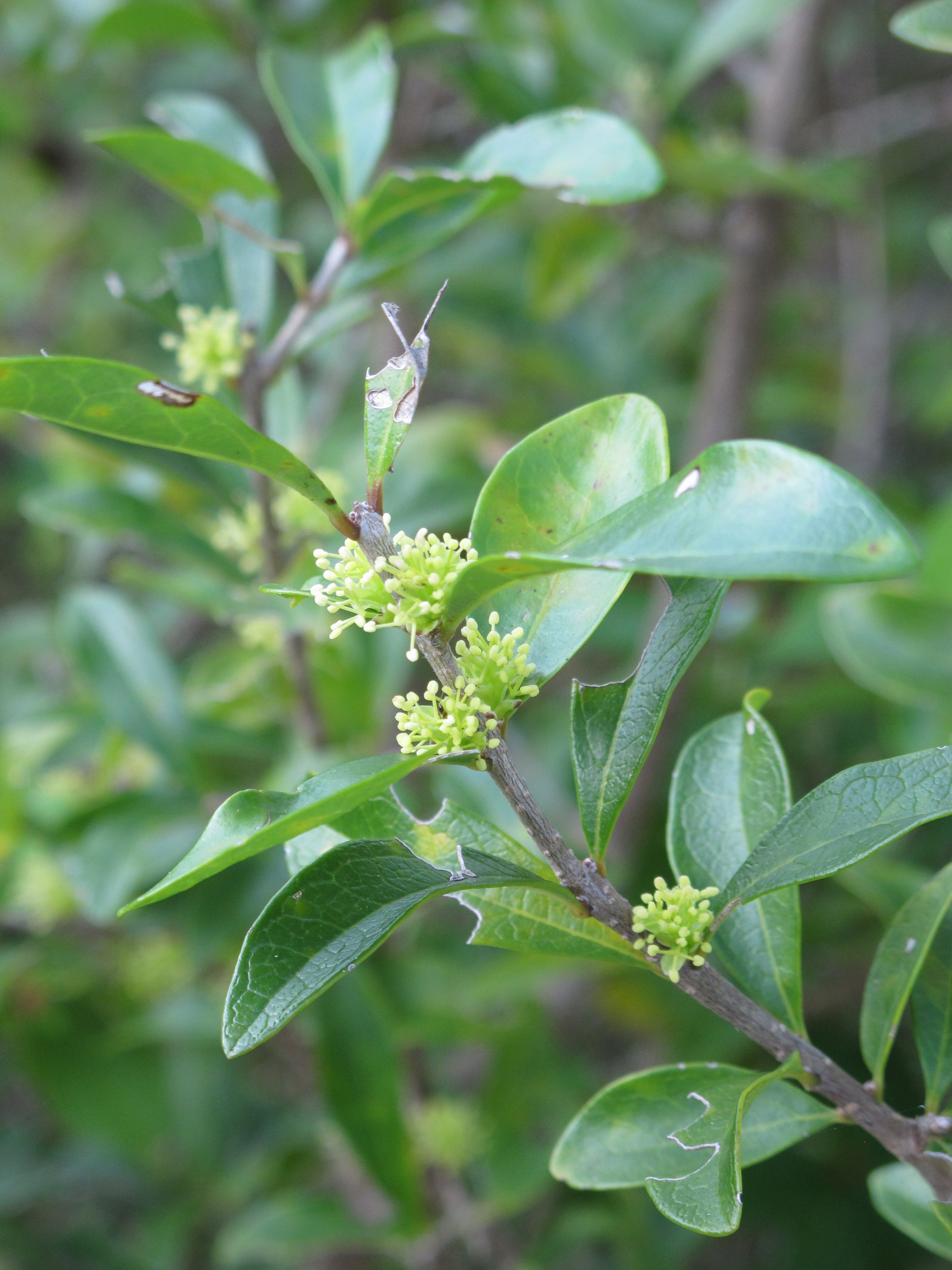

Conservation status
- Least Concern (IUCN 3.1)

- Apparently Secure (NatureServe)

Scientific classification
- Kingdom: Plantae
- Clade: Embryophytes
- Clade: Tracheophytes
- Clade: Angiosperms
- Clade: Eudicots
- Clade: Asterids
- Order: Lamiales
- Family: Oleaceae
- Genus: Forestiera
- Species: F. segregata

Binomial name
- Forestiera segregata (Jacq.) Krug & Urb.

= Forestiera segregata =

Species of flowering plant

Forestiera segregata is a species of flowering plant in the olive family known by the common names Florida privet, Florida swampprivet, and southern privet. It is native to the Bahamas, the Greater Antilles, including Puerto Rico and the Cayman Islands, the Lesser Antilles, including Anguilla, and Florida, Georgia, and South Carolina in the United States.

This plant is a shrub or small tree growing up to three to seven meters tall. The gray or brownish twigs have lenticels. The leaves are widely lance-shaped, oval, or spatula-shaped with narrowed bases. They are up to 5 to 7 centimeters long. The plant is evergreen or deciduous. The flowers are small and greenish yellow in color. They are pollinated by insects. The fruit is a black or bluish drupe up to a centimeter long. It stains cloth and skin and is bad-tasting.

There are two varieties of this species: the more common var. segregata and the less common var. pinetorum, which occurs in Florida, Georgia, and the Bahamas.

This species is used in cultivation as a hedge which is easily clipped into shape.
